= 237th Cavalry Regiment =

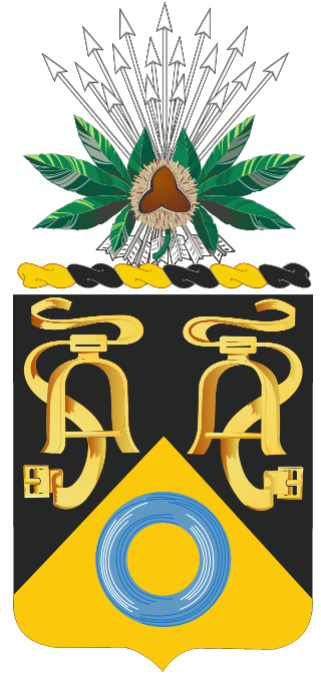
- Coat of Arms of the 237th Cavalry
- Active: 1946–1968; 1977–1994
- Country: United States
- Branch: United States Army
- Type: Reconnaissance (Parent regiment under Combat Arms Regimental System)
- Part of: 37th Infantry Division (1st Squadron)
- Garrison/HQ: Cincinnati (1949–1968)
- Motto: "Decision with Might"

Insignia
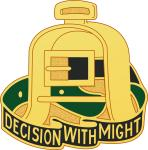
- Distinctive Unit Insignia

The 237th Cavalry Regiment was a United States Army parent cavalry regiment, represented in the Ohio Army National Guard by Troop A, 237th Cavalry, part of the 73rd Infantry Brigade with headquarters at Cincinnati.

The 237th traced its origins back to the tank battalion of the Ohio National Guard, organized in 1949, which soon became an armored cavalry battalion and in 1959 was converted into a reconnaissance squadron. The 237th Cavalry was redesignated as a parent regiment in 1963 and included the 1st Squadron in the 37th Infantry Division, which was broken up in 1968. Troop A, 237th Cavalry was redesignated from a former 1st Squadron unit in 1977. In 1994, it was consolidated with the 2nd Squadron, 107th Cavalry Regiment.

== History ==
The regiment was constituted on 3 July 1946 as the 185th Tank Battalion in the Ohio National Guard. It was organized and Federally recognized on 20 January 1949 with headquarters at Cincinnati. On 15 September, it was redesignated as the 2nd Battalion of the 107th Armored Cavalry Regiment. On 1 September 1959, it became the 2nd Reconnaissance Squadron, 137th Armor.

On 1 April 1963, the squadron was redesignated as the 237th Cavalry, a Combat Arms Regimental System parent regiment, consisting of the 1st Squadron, part of the 37th Infantry Division. The squadron was organized from existing units of the 2nd Reconnaissance Squadron. The 1st Squadron's Headquarters and Headquarters Troop (HHT) was redesignated from the 2nd Reconnaissance Squadron HHT at Cincinnati, Troop A from the 2nd Reconnaissance Squadron's Troop A at Cincinnati, Troop B from the 2nd Reconnaissance Squadron's Troop B at Cincinnati, and Troop C from the 2nd Reconnaissance Squadron's Troop C at Cincinnati. The 1st Squadron participated in the 1965 Cincinnati Memorial Day parade, displaying its heavy tanks. Elements of the squadron, equipped with eight M48 Patton tanks and 30 jeeps, participated in the 1967 Veterans Day parade in Cincinnati.

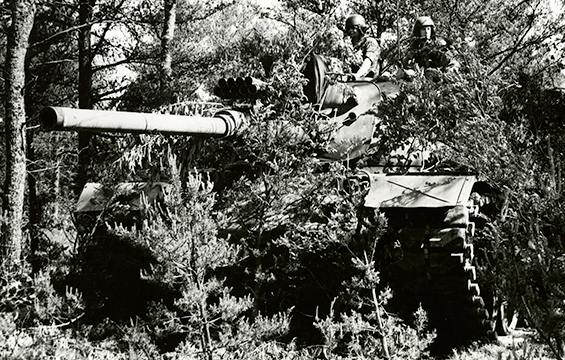
Members of Troop A providing security to infantrymen of the 73rd Brigade at Camp Grayling during a 1984 exercise, 1st Platoon Troopers shown on the Right Spc.4 Terry Miller, Left (Plt.Sgt) Staff Sgt, Gary Anderson

On 15 February 1968, the 1st Squadron was broken up and its elements redesignated or consolidated as part of a nationwide Guard reorganization. The HHT became the 191st Engineer Company, Troop A consolidated with the 191st Engineer Company, Troop B became Troop A of the 1st Squadron, 238th Cavalry, and Troop C consolidated with Troop A of the 238th's 1st Squadron. On 1 March 1977, Troop A of the 238th's 1st Squadron was redesignated as Troop A, 237th Cavalry, part of the 73rd Infantry Brigade. During 1981 summer training at Camp Grayling, the troop was visited by then-Governor of Ohio Jim Rhodes. On 1 June 1989, the 237th was reorganized as a parent regiment under the United States Army Regimental System. On 6 September 1992, the 73rd Brigade was redesignated as the 37th Infantry Brigade. On 31 March 1994, Troop A was consolidated with 2nd Squadron, 107th Armored Cavalry, which concurrently became the 107th Cavalry.
