= 107th Cavalry Regiment =

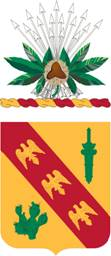
- Coat of arms
- Active: 10 Oct 1877 to 1 Sep 1993 as 107th Cavalry Regiment 1 Sep 1993 to 31 Aug 2007 as 1–107th & 2–107th Cavalry 1 Sep 2007 to Present as 2nd Squadron, 107th Cavalry Regiment
- Country: United States of America
- Branch: United States Army
- Type: Regimental Reconnaissance, Attack & Assault (Parent regiment under USARS)
- Role: Cavalry
- Size: Battalion
- Part of: Ohio National Guard
- Garrison/HQ: Hamilton, Ohio
- Nickname: REDHORSE
- Mottos: Facere non-Dicere (Latin: "To Act, Not To Speak")
- March: "The Black Horse Troop"
- Engagements: World War I: Ypres-Lys 1918; Lorraine 1918; World War II: Central Europe; Northern France; Rhineland; Northern Solomons; Luzon (Arrowhead Device); Operation Iraqi Freedom Operation Inherent Resolve

Commanders
- 107th ACR, Commander: Regiment Inactivated 1993
- 2–107th Squadron Commander: LTC Russell P. Galeti, Jr.
- Command Sergeant Major 2–107th Cavalry: CSM Lee C. Martin

Insignia
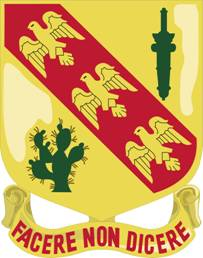
- Distinctive unit insignia
- Identification symbol: Former SSI

U.S. Cavalry Regiments
- Previous: Next
106th Cavalry Regiment (Illinois Army National Guard)	108th Cavalry Regiment (Georgia and Louisiana Army National Guards)

The 107th Cavalry Regiment, Ohio Army National Guard, is a parent regiment under the U.S. Army Regimental System, with headquarters at Hamilton, Ohio. It currently consists of the 2nd Squadron, 107th Cavalry Regiment, part of the 37th Infantry Brigade Combat Team (BUCKEYE), Ohio National Guard located throughout southwest Ohio.

Elements of the regiment were involved in the Kent State shootings during the Vietnam War.

== History ==
=== 19th century ===
The 1st Cleveland Troop organized on 28 April 1886 at Cleveland. It was redesignated in 1895 as Troop A (1st Cleveland Troop) before being expanded, reorganized, and redesignated on 3 May 1898 as Troops A, B, C, 1st Ohio Volunteer Cavalry; the remainder of regiment being organized from new and existing units. The 1st Ohio Volunteer Cavalry mustered into federal service 9–11 May 1898 at Camp Bushnell, Ohio; mustered out of federal service 22–24 October 1898 at Cleveland. The former Troop A (1st Cleveland Troop) reorganized on 14 April 1899 in the Ohio National Guard at Cleveland; Troop B reorganized on 12 December 1902 in the Ohio National Guard at Columbus.

=== Early 20th century ===
The unit was reorganized on 25 July 1910 as the 1st Cavalry Squadron with headquarters at Cleveland. Troops C and D were organized in 1911 at Cincinnati and Toledo, respectively. It was mustered into federal service on 6 July 1916 at Columbus, and mustered out on 28 February 1917 at Fort Benjamin Harrison, Indiana.

It expanded on 16 April 1917 as the 1st Cavalry. It was again expanded, converted, and redesignated on 23 May 1917 as the 2nd and 3rd Field Artillery Regiments, then mustered into federal service on 15 July 1917 at Cleveland and Youngstown, respectively. After being drafted into federal service on 5 August 1917, the units were reorganized and redesignated on 15 September 1917 as the 135th and 136th Field Artillery Regiments, respectively, and assigned to the 37th Division, before being demobilized on 10 April 1919 at Camp Sherman, Ohio.

=== Interwar period ===
Units of the 1st Ohio Cavalry were organized between 20 October 1919-18 November 1920. The 107th Cavalry Regiment was constituted in the National Guard in 1921, assigned to the 22nd Cavalry Division, and allotted to the state of Ohio, with the 1st Ohio Cavalry redesignated the 107th Cavalry on 1 July 1921. Subordinate squadron headquarters were organized and federally recognized as follows: 1st Squadron organized on 20 December 1921 at Cincinnati; 2nd Squadron organized on 13 April 1921 at Akron. The regimental headquarters was organized on 17 February 1922 and federally recognized at Cincinnati; it was relocated in June 1927 to Cleveland. Reorganized on 30 June 1929 as a three-squadron regiment; the 3rd Squadron headquarters was organized at Barberton. The regiment, or elements thereof, was called up to perform the following state duties: escort for Marshal Ferdinand Foch of France on his visit to Cleveland in 1921; coal miner strike duty at Middleport and St. Clairsville, 26 July–16 August 1922; tornado relief duty at Lorain and Sandusky, Ohio, 28 June–16 July 1924; martial law in connection with civil disorders and Ku Klux Klan riots in Niles, 2–5 November 1924; escort for General of the Armies John J. Pershing on his visit to Cleveland in 1927; escort for President Herbert Hoover on his visit to Cleveland on 2 October 1930; coal miner strike duty at Cadiz, 16 April–17 August 1932; riot control during a workers’ strike at the Auto-Lite plant at Toledo, 23 May–2 June 1934; and for disaster relief duty during the Ohio River flood of January–March 1937. The regiment conducted summer training at Camp Perry, Ohio, 1921–34, 1936, 1938–39, and at Fort Knox, Kentucky, in 1935 and 1937. Reorganized and redesignated 107th Cavalry Regiment (Horse and Mechanized) on 1 November 1940. Concurrently, the 22nd Reconnaissance Squadron was redesignated as elements of the new 1st Squadron and relieved from the 22nd Cavalry Division. The regiment was assigned to the VII Corps on 30 December 1940, and inducted into active federal service on 5 March 1941. It was transferred on 16 March 1941 to Camp Forrest, Tennessee. It participated in the production of the MGM Pictures movie “The Bugle Sounds” in June 1941 while participating in the Louisiana Maneuvers.

=== World War II ===
The regiment was broken up on 1 January 1944 and its elements reorganized and redesignated as follows: Headquarters and Headquarters Troop as Headquarters and Headquarters Troop, 107th Cavalry Group, Mechanized; 2nd Squadron as the 107th Cavalry Reconnaissance Squadron, Mechanized; 1st Squadron as the 22nd Cavalry Reconnaissance Squadron, Mechanized (hereafter separate lineage). After 1 January 1944, the above units underwent changes as follows:

=== Post war ===
Headquarters and Headquarters Troop, 107th Cavalry Group, Mechanized, inactivated 6 March 1945 at Camp Polk, LA; 107th Cavalry Reconnaissance Squadron, Mechanized, inactivated 16 November 1945 at Camp Bowie, TX. The regiment was reorganized and federally recognized on 10 November 1947 as the 107th Mechanized Cavalry Reconnaissance Squadron with headquarters at Cleveland. Headquarters and Headquarters Troop, 107th Cavalry Group, and 107th Mechanized Cavalry Reconnaissance Squadron consolidated on 15 September 1949 with the 185th Tank Battalion (organized and federally recognized 12 December 1946 – 30 March 1949 with headquarters at Cincinnati) and the consolidated unit designated as the 107th Armored Cavalry at Cleveland (The 1st Squadron was allotted on 31 May 1977 to the West Virginia Army National Guard as 1st Squadron 150th Armored Cavalry).

The 1970 riot at Kent State University resulted in the calling out of Troop G of the 2nd Squadron 107th Armored Cavalry, along with Companies A and C, 1-145th Infantry, Ohio Army National Guard (ARNG). Troop G was one of the units on the campus grounds, attempting to disperse the agitators and students after the burning of the ROTC (Reserve Officers' Training Corps) building. On 4 May 70, four Students were killed when the Guardsmen from Troop G fired to suppress the rioting crowd. A following court investigation found the Troop G Guardsmen guiltless of any wrongdoing.

The 107th Armored Cavalry Regimental Headquarters were located on Green Road in Warrensville Township, Ohio. 1st Squadron 107th Armored Cavalry Regiment served in Cleveland, Ohio for police actions and riot control in 1966 and 1968. The Squadron was also called up for police actions in February 1975 when the independent truckers staged a strike over fuel prices. The 1st Squadron 107th Armored Cavalry Regiment was put on alert in October 1973 during the Arab/Israeli conflict. If activated the mission would have been to assume border patrols in Germany with Czechoslovakia to free up the 3rd Armored Cavalry to move to the Mid-East. From 1966 through 1977, 1st Squadron of the 107th Armored Cavalry Regiment consisted of: Squadron headquarters (HHT) and A Troop located in Ashtabula, Ohio. B Troop in Painesville, Ohio. C Troop in Chagrin Falls, Ohio. Company D (Tanks) and How Battery in Stow, Ohio.

The regiment (minus 1st Squadron) reorganized on 1 May 1977 in the Ohio Army National Guard (Troop A, Support Squadron, was allotted on 1 October 1986 to the West Virginia Army National Guard and re-allotted on 15 October 1990 to the Ohio Army National Guard). It was placed on 1 June 1989 under the United States Army Regimental System consisting of the following units:

Headquarters and Headquarters Troop 107th ACR – Cleveland, OH;

1st Squadron 150th Cavalry Regiment – Bluefield, WV;

2nd Squadron 107th ACR – Akron, OH;

3rd Squadron 107th ACR – Stow, OH;

4th Squadron 107th ACR – Greensburg, OH;

Regimental Support Squadron – Medina, OH.

=== Post 1990 ===
The 107th ACR was reorganized and redesignated on 1 September 1993 as the 1st Battalion 107th Cavalry Regiment, headquarters in Stow, Ohio (formerly the 3/107th ACR) and assigned to the 28th Infantry Division. The 2nd Squadron, 107th Cavalry, was assigned to the 37th Armor Brigade. On 1 September 1994 the 1st Battalion 107th Cavalry and the 2nd Squadron 107th Cavalry, were realigned and assigned to the 37th Armor Brigade, 38th Infantry Division.

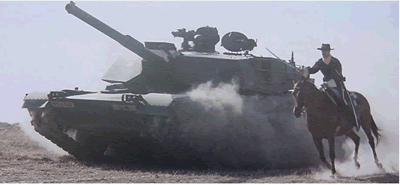
107th ACR horse soldier rides with a M1 tank

In September 2001, the 1st Battalion 107th Cavalry Regiment, was transferred from the 37th Brigade, 38th Infantry Division ("Cyclone") (Indiana Army National Guard) to the 2nd Brigade, 28th Infantry Division ("Keystone") (Pennsylvania Army National Guard) with its headquarters remaining in Stow, Ohio.

=== Iraq ===
In October 2003, B and C Companies, and elements of Headquarters and Headquarters Company (HHC) and Company A, of the 1st Battalion, 107th Cavalry were activated at their home stations and traveled to Fort Bragg, North Carolina, and Fort Stewart, Georgia, for five months of mobilization training. There they were then attached to the 1st Battalion, 150th Armor (West Virginia Army National Guard), the 1st Battalion, 252nd Armor (North Carolina Army National Guard), and Troop E, 196th Cavalry (North Carolina Army National Guard) respectively, for deployment to Operation Iraqi Freedom II with North Carolina's 30th Brigade Combat Team under the 1st Infantry Division. These elements of the 1st Battalion operated in Iraq from February to December 2004, serving in Kirkush, Tuz Khurmatu, Jalawla, and Baghdad. They participated in the Transition of Iraq and Iraqi Governance campaigns and returned home in late December 2004.

The battalion commander LTC Richard T. Curry and CSM Albert Whatmough along with the remaining companies continued their regular training cycle until October 2004, when the remaining companies of the 1–107th Cavalry were activated for service in Operation Iraqi Freedom III. One element of HHC 1–107th Cavalry was then deployed to Fort Dix, New Jersey for mobilization training and left for Kuwait in January 2005. The companies operated in Baghdad, Iraq and performed detainee operations at Camps Cropper and Victory.

The headquarters was deployed to Fort McCoy, Wisconsin and arrived in Kuwait in December 2004 and deployed to Mosul, Iraq in late December. This element included LTC Richard T. Curry the 1st Battalion 107th Cavalry Regiment Commander and CSM Albert Whatmough who both deployed with the battalion in 2004–2005 with the mission of establishing the Forward Operating Base (FOB) Endurance which later became known as FOB Q-West Base Complex 30 Kilometers south of Mosul, Iraq. The mission of LTC Curry and his staff were to provide command & control of the base, establish the Base Defense Operations Center, provide life support functions, establish base defense security, combat patrols and build the FOB from the ground up into the largest logistical hub operating in northern Iraq by the end of 2005, a mission that was accomplished prior to their departure.

The FOB Endurance/Q-West Base Complex HQ elements of the 1–107th Cavalry were attached to the 11th Armored Cavalry Regiment and received the Army Meritorious Unit Commendation (MUC) for their accomplishments. The HHC/A Convoy Security Company conducted operations throughout Iraq logging in thousands of miles with no fatalities and provided excellent security for convoy elements. Elements of the 1st Battalion, 107th Cavalry served within the 1st Cavalry Division, 4th Infantry Division, and 3rd Infantry Division areas of operations as units of the 18th and 42nd MP Brigades. The final elements returned home from Iraq in January 2006 reuniting the battalion. Both HHC/A detachments received the U.S. Army Meritorious Unit Commendation for their service.

=== Kosovo ===
The 2–107th Cavalry conducted peacekeeping operations in Kosovo under the Command of LTC John C. Harris in 2004–2005. The squadron was assigned as part of Task Force Falcon commanded by Brigadier General Tod J. Carmony (Deputy Commander 38th IN Division) and Deputy Commander (Maneuver) COL Jack E. Lee (37th Armor Brigade Commander), assigned an area of operations at Camp Bondsteel. The 2–107th Cavalry mobilized all of its units and 350 soldiers to support the deployment. A total of 1,000 Ohio Army National Guard soldiers mobilized in June 2004 for four months of training prior to a six-month deployment to Kosovo as peacekeepers. The soldiers first trained at Camp Atterbury, IN., followed by more training in Germany. The soldiers arrived in Kosovo in September 2004 beginning their mission. In late February 2005 the Ohio Army National Guard welcomed home the 2nd Squadron 107th Cavalry Regiment after successfully completing the NATO peace keeping mission in Kosovo.

== Reorganization ==
As the U.S. Army conducted its largest reorganization since the Second World War, the 1st Battalion 107th Cavalry Regiment, along with D Company from the 1st Battalion, 148th Infantry, as well as a company from the 112th Engineer Battalion, were chosen to form a new combined arms battalion within the 37th Brigade Combat Team, 38th Infantry Division. A change in designation was required and the unit uncased the new colors of the 1st Battalion, 145th Armored Regiment, effective 1 September 2007. With the 1st Battalion 107th Cavalry Regiment redesignated as such, the only currently remaining element of the 107th Cavalry Regiment is the 2nd Squadron with headquarters at Cincinnati, Ohio.

== Heraldry ==
=== Coat of arms ===
- Shield: Or, on a bend Gules between a Roman Sword in sheath point to base and a prickly pear cactus both Vert, three alerions of the field.
- Crest: That for the regiments and separate battalions of the Ohio Army National Guard: From a wreath Or and Gules, a sheaf of seventeen arrows Argent bound by a sprig of buckeye (aesculus glabra) fructed Proper (two leaves bursting burr).
- Motto: FACERE NON DICERE(To Act, Not To Speak)

The shield is yellow for cavalry. The bend charged with the alerions, taken from the arms of Lorraine, is representative of World War I service and is red to indicate that the 107th Cavalry served as Field Artillery during World War I. The Roman Sword in sheath is for Spanish–American War service and the cactus for Mexican Border duty. The motto translates to "To Act, Not To Speak."

The coat of arms was originally approved for the 107th Cavalry Regiment, Ohio National Guard on 8 March 1927. It was amended to correct the wording of the blazon of the shield on 17 June 1927. It was redesignated for the 107th Armored Cavalry Regiment, Ohio National Guard on 15 January 1952. The insignia was amended to add the crest of the State of West Virginia on 22 March 1971. It was amended to delete the crest of the State of West Virginia on 3 April 1975. The coat of arms was redesignated effective 1 September 1993, for the 107th Cavalry Regiment.

== Leaders ==
=== Regimental commanders ===
1. COL P. Lincoln Mitchell, 1921 – 1924
2. COL Willard O. Lathrop, 1924 – 1926
3. COL Dudley J. Hard, 1926
4. COL Joseph J. Johnston, 1927
5. COL Newell C. Bolton, 1927 – 1936
6. COL Woods King, 1936 – 1943 (World War II, CONUS Service)
7. COL Ralph King, 1943 – 1945 (World War II, European Theater)
8. COL Walter J. Easton, 1947 – 1955
9. COL Charles D. Marsh, 1955 – 1960
10. COL Edmund G. Nowich, 1960 – 1962
11. COL Ben F. Ritenour, 1962 – 1963
12. COL George F. Huxel, 1963 – 1965
13. COL Robert H. Canterburry, 1965 – 1967
14. COL Dana L. Stewart, 1967 – 1971
15. COL James A. Hill, 1971 – 1974
16. COL Raymond R. Galloway, 1974 – 1977
17. COL Arthur E. Wallach, 1977 – 1980
18. COL Richard J. Lander, 1980 – 1983
19. COL John E. Martin, 1983 – 1986
20. COL J. Steve Martin, 1986 – 1991
21. COL Mark V. Ryan, 1991 – 1993

=== Commanders 1–107th Cavalry ===
- LTC Kenneth R. Warner, 1993 – 1996
- LTC Phillip Richardson, 1996 – 1999
- LTC Donald Barbee, 1999 – 2000
- LTC James E. Perry, 2000 – 2003
- LTC Richard T. Curry, 2003 – 2006 (Operation Iraqi Freedom)
- LTC Jeffery J. Ziol, 2006 – 2007

=== Commanders 2–107th Cavalry ===
- LTC Larry M. Hott, 1994 – 1996
- LTC Michael P. Emerine, 1996 – 1999
- LTC Robert A. Recchluti, 1999 – 2001
- LTC John C. Harris, 2001 – 2005 (Kosovo)
- LTC Todd A. Mayer, 2005 – 2008
- LTC John A. Zulfer, 2008 – 2010
- LTC James D. Eriksen Jr., 2010 – 2012
- LTC Daniel J. Long, 2012 – 2014
- LTC Joshua B. Quantz, 2014 – 2017
- LTC Dion A. Grener, 2017 – 2020
- LTC Aaron A. Combs, 2020 – 2022
- LTC William R. Cousins IV, 2022 – 2026 (Operation Inherent Resolve, Syria)
- LTC Russell P. Galeti, Jr., 2026 – Present

=== Command Sergeants Major, 107th ACR ===
- CSM William S. Walker, 1968 – 1973
- CSM Philip A. Caranci, 1973 – 1984
- CSM Nate Monastra, 1984 – 1993

=== Command Sergeants Major, 1–107th Cavalry ===
- CSM Michael Campbell, 1993 – 1997 (Vietnam)
- CSM Timothy Johnson, 1997 – 2000 (Vietnam, Kosovo)
- CSM Albert M. Whatmough, 2000 – 2007 (Operation Iraqi Freedom)
- CSM Timothy Hornung, 2007 (Operation Iraqi Freedom)

=== Command Sergeants Major, 2–107th ===
- CSM Craig R. Huffman, 1994 – 1996
- CSM Donald E. Cain II, 1997 – 2000
- CSM Terry T. Dillon, 2000 – 2002 (Vietnam, Kosovo)
- CSM William F. Belding, 2003 – (Kosovo, Operation Enduring Freedom Afghanistan)
- CSM David LaRussa, 2010 – 2013
- CSM Todd R. Seurkamp, 2013 – 2018
- CSM Robert D. Corner, 2017 – 2021
- CSM Gordon L. Cairns, 2021 – 2024 (Operation Inherent Resolve, Syria)
- CSM Lee C. Martin, 2024 – Present
