= The Black Horse Troop =

1924 military march by John Philip Sousa

- by John Philip Sousa
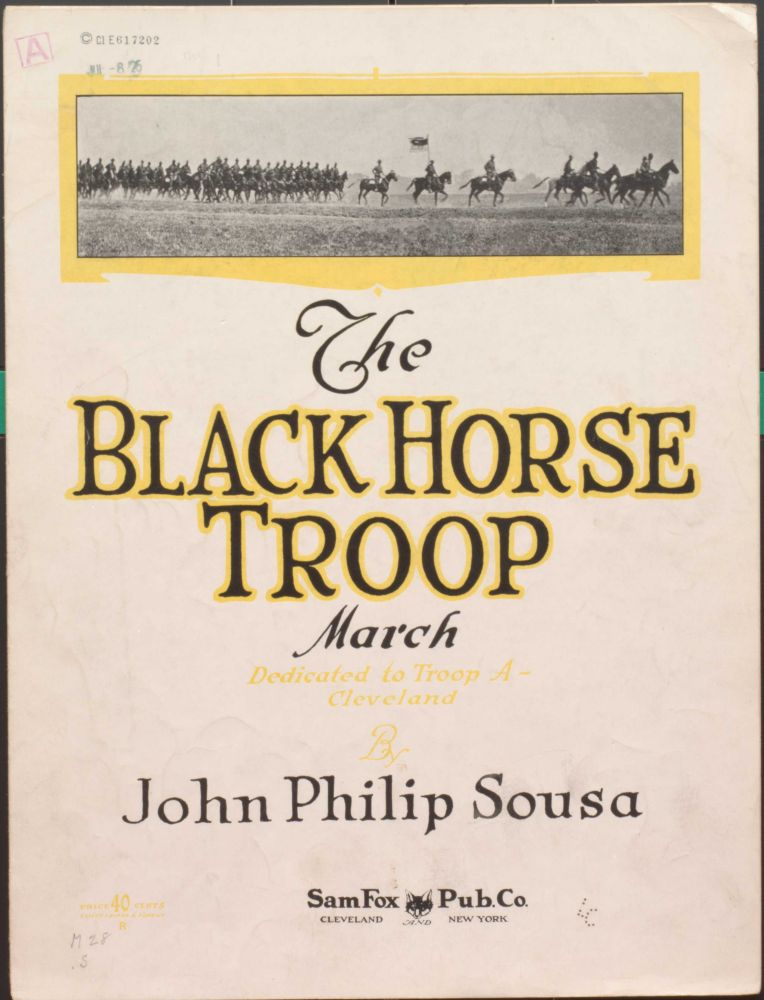
- Year: 1924
- Genre: March
- Dedication: Troop A - Cleveland, Ohio National Guard
- Published: 1925, Cleveland
- Publisher: Sam Fox Publishing Company

Audio sample
- U.S. Air Force Band of the Rockies performing the march: file; help

"The Black Horse Troop" is an American military march composed by John Philip Sousa in 1924 and published in 1925. It was dedicated to Troop A - Cleveland of the Ohio National Guard, today the 107th Cavalry Regiment. Sousa's first connection with Troop A was in 1881, when he marched with the unit as leader of the U.S. Marine Band in the funeral cortege of President James A. Garfield.

== History ==
In his 1984 book, The Works of John Philip Sousa, Paul E. Bierley described the history and background of the march:

"Sousa’s love for horses is reflected in this march dedicated to the mounted troops of a Cleveland National Guard unit. Their exclusive use of black horses was the inspiration for the title. Troop A, once known as the First City Troop of Cleveland, was originally an independent militia group and has had a long, distinguished history since its formation in 1877. Sousa’s most noteworthy association with the troop came in 1898. The Sousa Band, having arrived in Cleveland just as the troop was preparing to leave for the Spanish-American War, marched in a parade escorting them from the Armory to the train depot. His first association was much earlier, however. As leader of the U.S. Marine Band in 1881, he marched with the organization in the funeral cortege of President James A. Garfield.

At a dinner held in Sousa’s honor in November, 1924, the march was requested by Captain Walker Nye of Troop A. The request was fulfilled promptly, and the march was presented in Cleveland on October 17, 1925, at a Sousa Band concert which also marked the forty-eighth anniversary of Troop A. For the occasion, the mounted troopers were dressed in the blue uniforms of 1877, complete with black fur busbies. Sousa presented a manuscript of the march to Captain Nye. Troop A reciprocated by presenting Sousa with a beautiful bronze statuette entitled “The Last Drop,” which depicted a trooper on horseback.

Many of the former Sousa Band members expressed their fondness for this composition and commented on the descriptive character it assumed when performed by Sousa himself. Part of the effect was due to the 6/8 rhythm, which suggests the canter of horses. Also contributing to the effect was Sousa’s use of simulated hoofbeats."

== See also ==
- List of marches by John Philip Sousa
