= 37th Infantry Brigade Combat Team =

37th Infantry Brigade Combat Team (Buckeye)
- 37th IBCT Shoulder Sleeve Insignia
- Active: 1917–1919, 1923–1945, 1946–present
- Country: United States
- Allegiance: Ohio Army National Guard
- Branch: United States Army National Guard
- Type: Infantry
- Size: Brigade
- Part of: 38th Infantry Division (United States)
- Headquarters: Columbus, Ohio
- Nickname: "Buckeye"
- Motto: "No Time For Glory"
- Anniversaries: Luzon Day (9 January)
- Campaigns: World War I World War II operation joint guardian War on terrorism

Insignia
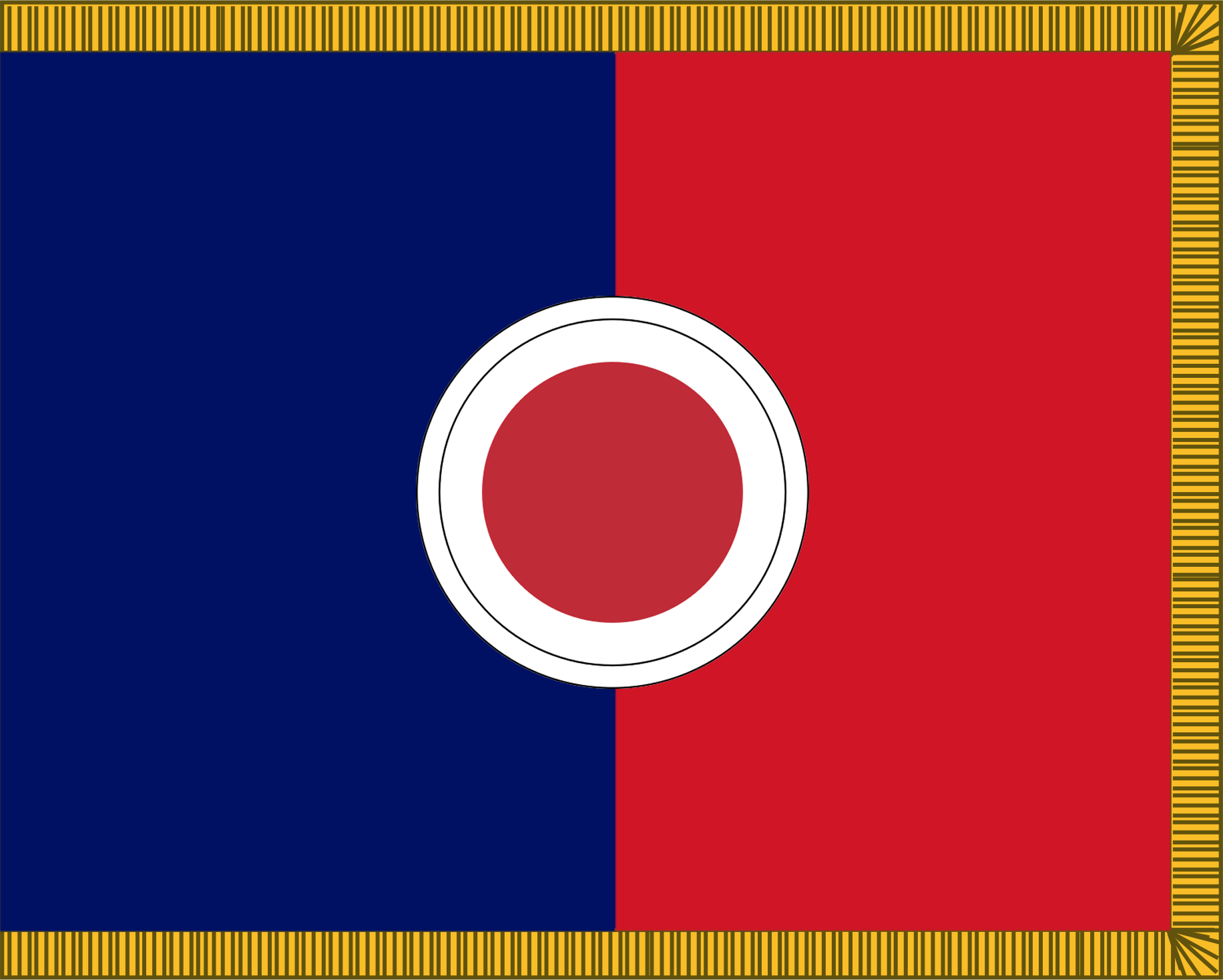
- 37th Infantry Brigade Combat Team Flag

The 37th Infantry Brigade Combat Team (Buckeye) is an infantry brigade combat team of the United States Army National Guard with the brigade headquarters, cavalry squadron, field artillery battalion, engineer battalion, one infantry battalion, and support battalion stationed in Ohio, one infantry battalion and military intelligence company stationed in Michigan, and a third infantry battalion stationed in South Carolina. The headquarters of the 37th IBCT traces its lineage and honors back to the headquarters of the 37th Infantry Division.

== Background ==
The 37th Infantry Brigade Combat Team is the largest combat arms unit in the Ohio Army National Guard. Part of the 38th Infantry Division, it carries the lineage and honors of the 37th Infantry Division, and is known as the "Buckeye Brigade." Prior to its transformation into an infantry brigade combat team (1 September 2007) it was the 37th Armor Brigade, Ohio National Guard (6 September 1992 – 31 August 2007) consisting of one infantry battalion (1–148th IN) two tank battalions (1–107th Armor(CAV), 1–147th Armor), a cavalry squadron (2–107th CAV), an artillery battalion (1–134th FA) and a forward support battalion (237th FSB). Although the majority of the 37th IBCT units belong to the Ohio Army National Guard, two battalions are based in Michigan and belong to the Michigan National Guard. The 37th IBCT has been called to service for the Global War on Terror, in Iraq (OIF) and Afghanistan (OEF).

== 37th Armor Brigade ==
The 37th Armor Brigade was originally constituted on 18 July 1917 in the Ohio National Guard as Headquarters, 37th "Buckeye" Division. It organized on 26 August 1917 at Camp Sheridan, Alabama, and demobilized on 23 June 1919 at Camp Sherman, Ohio. The unit reorganized and was federally recognized on 31 May 1923 in the Ohio National Guard at Columbus as Headquarters, 37th Division. It was inducted into federal service on 15 October 1940 at Columbus before being redesignated on 1 February 1942 as Headquarters, 37th Infantry Division and inactivating on 18 December 1945 at Camp Anza, California. Reorganized and federally recognized on 11 November 1946 at Columbus, it was ordered there into active federal service on 15 January 1952. (Headquarters, 37th Infantry Division [NGUS], was organized and federally recognized on 15 January 1954 at Columbus). The unit was released on 15 June 1954 from active federal service and federal recognition was concurrently withdrawn from Headquarters, 37th Infantry Division (NGUS).

73rd Infantry Brigade SSI

It was reorganized and redesignated on 15 February 1968 as Headquarters, 73rd Brigade, 38th Infantry Division; and on 1 March 1977 as Headquarters, 73rd Infantry Brigade, at which point it was relieved from assignment to the 38th Infantry Division. It was redesignated on 6 September 1992 as Headquarters, 37th Infantry Brigade. Reorganized and redesignated on 1 September 1993 as Headquarters and Headquarters Company, 37th Brigade, 28th Infantry Division, it concurrently relocated to North Canton. It was redesignated on 1 September 1994 as Headquarters and Headquarters Company, 37th Armor Brigade, 38th Infantry Division. On 1 September 2007 the 37th Armor Brigade was transformed and redesignated 37th Infantry Brigade Combat Team, Ohio Army National Guard.

== Commanders ==
- 37th Armor Brigade
  - BG Herbert B. Eagon, 1992–93 (Note 1)
  - COL David T. Hartley, 1993–94
  - COL Thomas P. Luczynski, 1994–96
  - COL Tod J. Carmony, 1996–99
  - COL Matthew L. Kambic, 1999–2002
  - COL Phillip E. Brondson, 2002–03
  - COL Jack E. Lee, 2003–05
  - COL James S. Green, 2005–06
  - COL Richard T. Curry, 2006–07
- 37th IBCT
  - COL Richard T. Curry, 2007–09
  - COL James E. Perry Jr., 2009–12
  - COL Gordon L. Ellis, 2012–14
  - COL Craig W. Baker, 2014–16
  - COL Corwin J. Lusk, 2016–19
  - COL Matthew S. Woodruff 2019–2021
  - COL Michael P. Flaherty 2021-Present

== Command Sergeants Major ==
- 37th Armor Brigade
  - CSM Craig R. Huffman, 1992–93
  - CSM Jeffery N. Carter, 1993–96
  - CSM Clyde E. Jackson, 1996–99
  - CSM David R. Thomas, 1999–2002
  - CSM Terry T. Dillon, 2002–05
  - CSM Lowell K. Shank, 2005–07
- 37th IBCT
  - CSM Albert M. Whatmough, 2007–09
  - CSM Rodger M. Jones, 2009–12
  - CSM Thomas Watson, 2012–16
  - CSM Jeffrey T. Schuster, 2016–20
  - CSM Michael Burress, 2020–Present

== Mission to Kosovo ==
Under the command of Task Force Falcon Commander Brigadier General Tod J. Carmony (Deputy Commander, 38th Infantry Division) and Colonel Jack E. Lee (37th Armor Brigade Commander), 1,000 Ohio Army National Guard soldiers mobilized in June 2004 for four months of training prior to a six-month deployment to Kosovo as peacekeepers as part of Operation Joint Guardian rotation KFOR-6A. Included in the group were 100 members of the Headquarters and Headquarters Company 37th Armor Brigade out of the armory at Akron-Canton Airport. More than 1,000 soldiers in a dozen units across Ohio have been mobilized for the assignment on the NATO-led peacekeeping force in Kosovo. The soldiers trained at Camp Atterbury, IN and then in Hohenfels, Bavaria, Germany. The soldiers arrived in Kosovo in August 2004 beginning their mission stationed at Camp Monteith and Camp Bondsteel in the MNB-East (Multi National Brigade) sector and returned in February 2005.

== Operation Iraqi Freedom ==
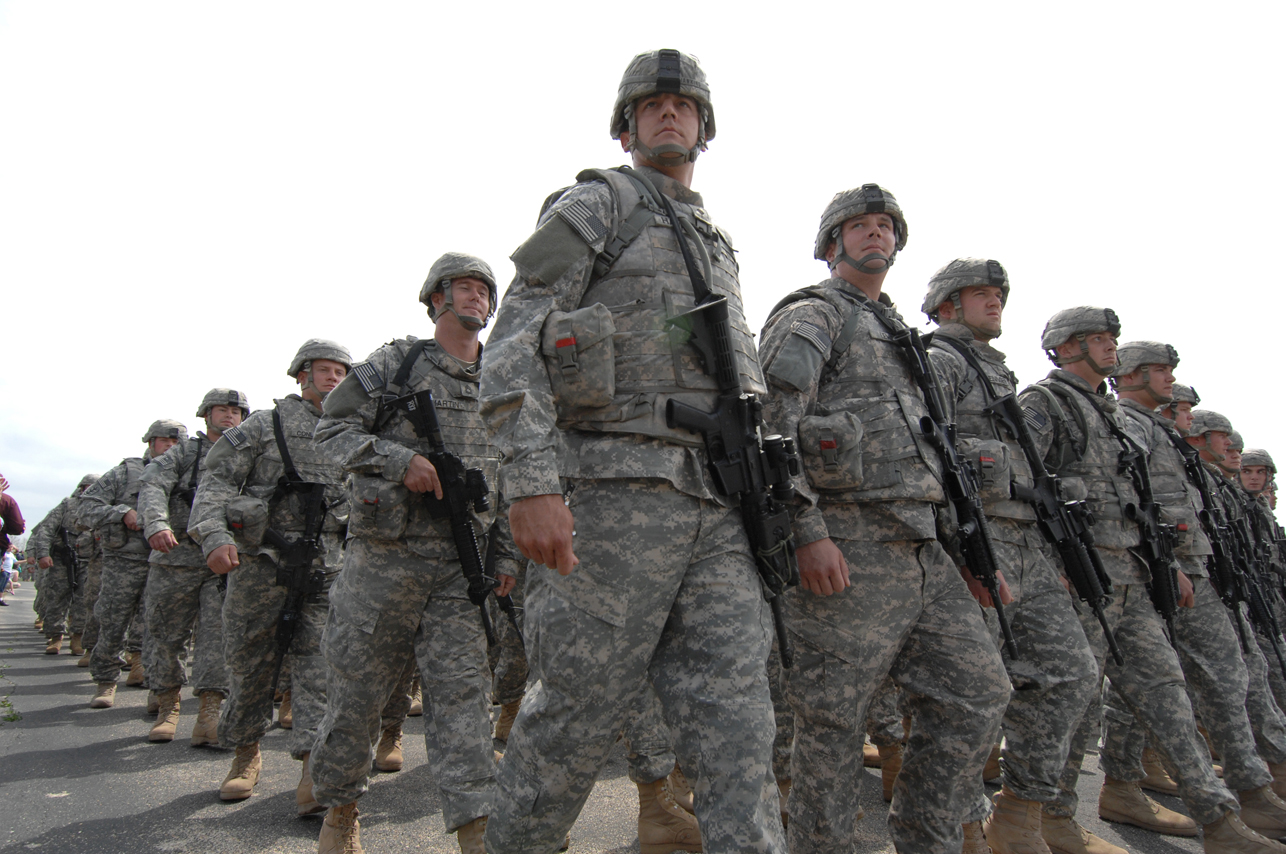
Soldiers of the 37th IBCT during pass & review ceremony, March 2008, Ft. Hood, Texas prior to deployment in support of OIF

The 37th IBCT deployment in support of Operation Iraqi Freedom (OIF) 2007–2008 included over 2,528 soldiers from Ohio and Michigan. This was at that time the largest deployment since World War II of one single unit from both states. The brigade was under the command of Colonel Richard T. Curry and conducted operations throughout Iraq and Kuwait. Missions included: SECFOR and port security operations, convoy security and escort, provincial reconstruction team security, Ramadi Provincial Government Center security, base camp force protection and command and control, Kabarri Crossing security, combat patrols, QRF (quick reaction force), ARF (area reaction force) and training of host nation military forces. Additionally, the brigade's lines of operations and efforts included: military; personnel and assets protected, new communications systems integrated (JNN), improved life support operations, political; positive relations with key leaders and stakeholders, information engagement; informed soldiers and families, media awareness and good relations with host nation center of influence, social; understanding a new culture and respecting it.

The brigade also conducted a communications mission in Afghanistan (OEF). In September 2008, Company C 37 STB (Signal) was assigned the mission of establishing a joint node network (JNN) throughout that theater of operation. This ability to communicate did not exist prior to C/37 STB completion of this mission. The 37th IBCT redeployed to Fort Hood, Texas for demobilization and then home to Ohio and Michigan in mid-December 2008.

COL Curry, at Fort Hood

=== Battalion commanders ===
1st Battalion, 125th Infantry – LTC Tad Reed

1st Battalion, 148th Infantry Regiment – LTC Zachary Dozer

1st Squadron, 126th Cavalry – LTC Bartholomew Verbanic

1st Battalion, 134th Field Artillery – LTC Steve Schemine

Special Troops Battalion – LTC John Detling

237th Brigade Support Battalion – LTC Garvey

=== Events, operations, missions and accomplishments ===
On 27 January 2007 during the Senior Commanders Conference at the National Guard Professional Education Center, Little Rock, Arkansas MG Greg Wayt, The Ohio Adjutant General, MG Matthew Kambic, Ohio Army Adjutant General and COL Richard Curry, Commander, 37 Infantry Brigade Combat Team received the notification of sourcing for a mission in support of Operation Iraqi Freedom for 2008 from the FORSCOM Commander and the NGB Chief. This was earlier than the anticipated date of 2009. The brigade was notified that it would be part of the historic 4+1 Brigade Combat Team deployment concept. This was a new strategy and for the first time during OIF & OEF the Department of Defense would no longer mobilize individual elements from National Guard brigades. Instead, brigade combat teams would mobilize and conduct operations that were once filled by many different individually mobilized battalion/company elements.

Curry (left) was the 37th IBCT commander & Durkac the 1–125th IN commander in Ar Ramadi, Iraq 2008

The 37 IBCT received the alert order on 9 April 2007, and mobilized 2 January 2008. The expected deployment date into theater was March 2008, giving the brigade time to conduct post-mobilization training at Ft. Hood, Texas. The missions were initially convoy security operations; SECFOR mission (security force); base camp operations in Kuwait and Iraq. Based on the mission the 37th IBCT would mobilize and deploy over 2,528 soldiers from Ohio and Michigan. Within 30 days after the brigade arrived at Ft. Hood the 37th IBCT commander was given an additional mission in Ar Ramadi, Iraq to consist of combat patrols and a SECFOR mission. This new task required the staff to redevelop the mission plan, re-aligning four of the six battalions to support this and other mission requirements. The 1-125 Infantry was given the Ramadi Iraq mission, 1-126 Cavalry took over the convoy security mission that 1-125 Infantry was previously assigned, 37 STB & 237 BSB were re-tasked to additionally perform the 1-126 Cavalry SECFOR, area reaction force and border patrol mission, although on a smaller scale due to not having enough soldiers to perform their own mission.

After a four-day pass the brigade conducted its send-off ceremony on the parade field in front of the III Corps Headquarters on Ft. Hood. Upon completion of the ceremony the first 37th IBCT elements departed for theater, arriving in Kuwait on 27 March 2008.

=== Mission, commander's intent and mission endstate ===
Mission: The 37th IBCT provides forces for Staging Base Command & Control, Security Operations, Convoy Security Forces, and Combat Patrols & Security Operations at Ramadi, Iraq to Area Support Group-Kuwait, 1st Theater Support Command, and Multi-National Force West Iraq within the Kuwait and Iraq Theater of Operations in order to maintain the combat capability of Multi-National Force Iraq.

Commander's intent: The purpose of this mission is to support MNF-I, ASG Kuwait and 1st TSC by providing forces for continuous and effective security, Command and Control (C2) and logistical support to US and coalition forces operating within the Kuwaiti and Iraqi Theater of Operations (ITO)in support of (ISO) the Global War on Terrorism (GWOT) and Operation Iraqi Freedom (OIF).

Endstate: Mission success is defined in our ability to protect throughput of CSS, receive, stage and onward move forces; and our ability to conduct security, combat patrols and convoy operations to maintain combat capability of forces, provide a secure Area of Operation (AO) with responsive Area Reaction Forces (ARF), and provide continuous operational security.

=== Major accomplishments ===
==== Headquarters ====
Provided command and control for brigade deployment operations

Command & control, administrative & logistical support for over 2,528 soldiers in theater

Command & control for SECFOR operations

Host nation coordination, relations and engagements

Command & staff coordination with Area Support Group Kuwait, 1st Theater Sustainment Command (1st TSC), 4th Sustainment Brigade, Multi National Forces West Iraq (USMC), Multi National Force Iraq (MNF-I)

Supervised, coordinated and executed host nation military partnering and training events. Trained over 1,500 host nation military personnel during the deployment

Oversight of base camp operations

Oversight of port security operations

Command & control of re-deployment & retrograde operations

Maintained communication with brigade rear detachment, Ohio/Michigan Joint Force Headquarters and family readiness groups (FRGs), first brigade to conduct a brigade commander and command sergeant major (CSM) teleconference with all the brigade's FRGs from theater.

==== Convoy security (1–148 IN & 1–126 CAV with A/1-125 IN) ====
The battalion traveled over 958,000 miles (1,542,000 km) on Iraqi main supply routes and alternate supply routes with no major injuries. However, there was at least 1 soldier wounded in combat and awarded the Purple Heart, but there was no loss of IBCT soldier life. These unites also provided free and clear passage to Combat logistics patrols with maximum security. This accomplished uninterrupted CSS for Iraq. Staff Sgt. David Malolepszy and Sgt. Gerald Pruitt were the battalion's first Soldiers to earn CIBs under the Buckeye patch since WW II when they experienced an improvised explosive device detonation April 20, 2008.

==== Ramadi, Iraq (1–125 IN) ====
1–125th IN after combat patrol, Ramadi, Iraq 2008

568 personnel security operations accomplished; 407 joint patrols with Iraqi Army & police in and around the Ramadi Provincial Government Center; 561 missions completed base OPS/BATS/QRF/sniper ops; 24 sustainment convoys completed to city of Al Asad, TQ Air Base, Baghdad International Airport & Victory Base; First IBCT to field and conduct operations with the new MRAP, Mine Resistant Ambush Protected Vehicles in MNF-W.

==== SECFOR (1–134 FA & G/237 BSB) ====
82,466 vehicle searches completed at KNB & SPOD; 61,627 TCN searches completed; 100 SPOT reports submitted; 82 warehouse security missions completed; 135 route security missions; 444 housing security missions completed; Over 50 host nation community events conducted at children's hospitals, disability center, fire departments and local businesses; Over 40 training events with Kuwaiti military conducted.

==== Base camp operations (STB, 237 BSB, HHC 37 IBCT) ====
Improvement of all life support operations at all bases; force protection execution, no significant breaches in security; support for RSOI and Theater Gateway; Establishment of good host nation relations; contract management.

=== Re-deployment ===
The 37th IBCT began to re-deploy to the Continental United States (Ft. Hood and then Ohio and Michigan) in December 2008. The first battalions departed 2–3 December and the final rear detachment element departed Kuwait on 16 December 2008. The brigade came home basically the same way it deployed to theater using the same number of aircraft and ships. The 37 IBCT mobilized 2,528 soldiers for the mission which was the largest deployment of a single unit since World War II. The brigade suffered no fatalities.

== Afghanistan 2008 ==
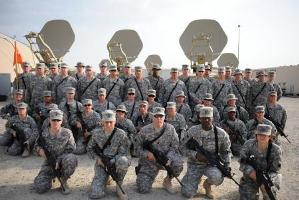
Task Force Dragon Blade

During the 37th IBCT's 2008 OIF mission and within 90 days of the brigade's re-deployment to the United States of America, it was tasked by CENTCOM and ARCENT (3rd Army) to provide 42 signal soldiers and their Joint Nodal Network (Communications) systems to Afghanistan for the remainder of their tour. C/37 STB (Signal Company), known as Task Force Dragon Blade, performed this mission. The task force was led by the brigade leadership of MAJ Teri Williams and MSG Christopher Ravis and by the company leadership of CPT Walt Work and 1SG Ray Tummel. The soldiers provided signal services and filled a vital communication gap that existed in that theater. The entire network was up and operational two days in advance of the deadline. On 10 December 2008, the 37th IBCT soldiers redeployed to Kuwait and then to home station on 12 December 2008 on schedule with the brigade headquarters which was the last 37th IBCT element to re-deploy.

== Afghanistan 2011 - 2012 ==
The 37th IBCT received notification in May 2010 of a possible deployment to Afghanistan in late 2011. In November 2011, the Department of Defense gave the 37th IBCT new mission orders due to changing requirements in Afghanistan. During mobilization training at Camp Shelby, Miss., the brigade was reduced in size and many soldiers were re-missioned due to the reduction in numbers needed in RC-North. The 37th IBCT did not deploy until early 2012 when on 1 February 2012, the 37th IBCT (Task Force Dragon) completed the transfer of authority from the 170th Infantry Brigade Combat Team (Task Force Bayonet) at Camp Mike Spann, Afghanistan. Mission: The 37th Infantry Brigade Combat Team (-) conducts security force assistance from February 2012 in Regional Command North in order to build Afghan National Police (Afghan Uniformed Police, Afghan Border Police and Afghan National Civil Order Police) capacity. Headquarters, 37th IBCT was deployed to RC-North in support of Operation Enduring Freedom in January 2012. Located primarily at Camp Mike Spann, the Soldiers of the Brigade Headquarters could be found in seven different locations across northern Afghanistan. While primarily supporting brigade operations with mission command, they also provided RC-North with robust intelligence, communications, logistical and maintenance support. In addition to these functions, they also provided all of the life support for Camp Mike Spann, which hosts more than 1,300 multinational soldiers and civilians. The mayor cell provided the contracting, movement control and accountability of millions of dollars in food, fuel, water and other services that support the camp. Headquarters Base Defense Operations Cell managed all of the security for Camp Spann, including a 1,780-man-hour weekly guard force and multiple entry control points. Headquarters was also responsible for range control operations for all of International Security Assistance Forces on Camp Spann. They ran eight international live-fire weapons training events involving 163 soldiers from seven countries that resulted in 126 qualifications or awards without incident or injury. Its range control team facilitated hundreds of ranges conducted by ISAF units to include U.S. Navy explosive ordnance disposal, German, Croatian, Norwegian and Swedish mentor-liaison teams, U.S. Special Forces and many others. During the 37th's deployment, three soldiers of the 1st Battalion, 148th Infantry Regiment were killed 4 April 2012 (CPT Nick Rozanski, MSG Shawn Hannon, and MSG Jeffery Rieck). The brigade returned home in October 2012.

Members from the 126 Cav regiment were sent to RC-South and station in Tahkteh Pol alongside ANP and tasked with carrying out joint security operations in the area spanning from Spin Buldak in the south to Kandahar Air field north of Tahkteh Pol. As well as manning a checkpoint along highway A75 approximately 30 miles south of The Ahmad Shah baba Airport.

== Organization 2025 ==
As of February 2026 the 37th Infantry Brigade Combat Team consists of the following units:

- 37th Infantry Brigade Combat Team, in Columbus (part of 38th Infantry Division)
  - Headquarters and Headquarters Company, 37th Infantry Brigade Combat Team, in Columbus
  - Detachment 1, Headquarters Support Company, Headquarters and Headquarters Battalion, 38th Infantry Division, in Columbus
  - 2nd Squadron, 107th Cavalry Regiment, in Hamilton
    - Headquarters and Headquarters Troop, 2nd Squadron, 107th Cavalry Regiment, in Hamilton
    - Troop A, 2nd Squadron, 107th Cavalry Regiment, in Greenville
    - Troop B, 2nd Squadron, 107th Cavalry Regiment, in Lebanon
    - Troop C (Dismounted), 2nd Squadron, 107th Cavalry Regiment, in Middletown
  - 1st Battalion, 118th Infantry Regiment, in Mount Pleasant (SC) — (South Carolina Army National Guard)
    - Headquarters and Headquarters Company, 1st Battalion, 118th Infantry Regiment, in Mount Pleasant (SC)
    - Company A, 1st Battalion, 118th Infantry Regiment, in Moncks Corner (SC)
    - Company B, 1st Battalion, 118th Infantry Regiment, at Joint Base Charleston (SC)
    - Company C, 1st Battalion, 118th Infantry Regiment, in Mullins (SC)
    - Company D (Weapons), 1st Battalion, 118th Infantry Regiment, in Marion (SC)
  - 1st Battalion, 125th Infantry Regiment, in Saginaw (MI) — (Michigan Army National Guard)
    - Headquarters and Headquarters Company, 1st Battalion, 125th Infantry Regiment, in Saginaw (MI)
      - Detachment 3, Headquarters and Headquarters Battery, 1st Battalion, 134th Field Artillery Regiment, in Saginaw (MI)
    - Company A, 1st Battalion, 125th Infantry Regiment, in Detroit (MI)
    - Company B, 1st Battalion, 125th Infantry Regiment, in Saginaw (MI)
    - Company C, 1st Battalion, 125th Infantry Regiment, in Wyoming (MI)
    - Company D (Weapons), 1st Battalion, 125th Infantry Regiment, in Big Rapids (MI)
  - 1st Battalion, 148th Infantry Regiment, in Walbridge
    - Headquarters and Headquarters Company, 1st Battalion, 148th Infantry Regiment, in Walbridge
    - Company A, 1st Battalion, 148th Infantry Regiment, in Walbridge
    - Company B, 1st Battalion, 148th Infantry Regiment, in Bowling Green
    - Company C, 1st Battalion, 148th Infantry Regiment, in Tiffin
    - Company D (Weapons), 1st Battalion, 148th Infantry Regiment, in Sandusky
  - 1st Battalion, 134th Field Artillery Regiment, in Delaware
    - Headquarters and Headquarters Battery, 1st Battalion, 134th Field Artillery Regiment, in Delaware
      - Detachment 1, Headquarters and Headquarters Battery, 1st Battalion, 134th Field Artillery Regiment, at McCrady Training Center (SC) — (South Carolina Army National Guard)
      - Detachment 3, Headquarters and Headquarters Battery, 1st Battalion, 134th Field Artillery Regiment, in Saginaw (MI) — (Michigan Army National Guard)
    - Battery A, 1st Battalion, 134th Field Artillery Regiment, in Delaware
    - Battery B, 1st Battalion, 134th Field Artillery Regiment, in Piqua
    - Battery C, 1st Battalion, 134th Field Artillery Regiment, in Marysville
  - 837th Brigade Engineer Battalion, in Springfield
    - Headquarters and Headquarters Company, 837th Brigade Engineer Battalion, in Springfield
    - Company A (Combat Engineer), 837th Brigade Engineer Battalion, in Wooster
    - Company B (Combat Engineer), 837th Brigade Engineer Battalion, in Lima
    - Company C (Signal), 837th Brigade Engineer Battalion, in Columbus
    - Company D (Military Intelligence), 837th Brigade Engineer Battalion, in Lansing (MI) — (Michigan Army National Guard)
  - 237th Brigade Support Battalion, in Cleveland
    - Headquarters and Headquarters Company, 237th Brigade Support Battalion, in Cleveland
    - Company A (Distribution), 237th Brigade Support Battalion, in Cleveland
    - Company B (Maintenance), 237th Brigade Support Battalion, in Youngstown
    - Company C (Medical), 237th Brigade Support Battalion, in Akron
    - Company D (Forward Support), 237th Brigade Support Battalion, in Hamilton — attached to 2nd Squadron, 107th Cavalry Regiment
    - Company E (Forward Support), 237th Brigade Support Battalion, in Springfield — attached to 837th Brigade Engineer Battalion
    - Company F (Forward Support), 237th Brigade Support Battalion, in Mansfield — attached to 1st Battalion, 134th Field Artillery Regiment
    - Company G (Forward Support), 237th Brigade Support Battalion, in Lima — attached to 1st Battalion, 148th Infantry Regiment
    - Company H (Forward Support), 237th Brigade Support Battalion, in Bay City (MI) — attached to 1st Battalion, 125th Infantry Regiment (Michigan Army National Guard)
    - Company I (Forward Support), 237th Brigade Support Battalion, at Joint Base Charleston (SC) — attached to 1st Battalion, 118th Infantry Regiment (South Carolina Army National Guard)
  - 1st Battalion, 145th Armored Regiment, Stow (attached, but part of 1st Armored Brigade Combat Team, 34th Infantry Division)
    - Headquarters and Headquarters Company, 1st Battalion, 145th Armored Regiment, in Stow
      - Detachment 2, Headquarters and Headquarters Battery, 1st Battalion, 125th Field Artillery Regiment, in Stow
    - Company A (Tank), 1st Battalion, 145th Armored Regiment, in Newton Falls
    - Company B (Tank), 1st Battalion, 145th Armored Regiment, in North Canton
    - Company C (Mechanized Infantry), 1st Battalion, 145th Armored Regiment, in Alliance
    - Company H (Forward Support), 134th Support Battalion, in Stow

== See also ==
- Ohio Army National Guard
