= 1st Battalion, 107th Cavalry Regiment =

- 28th Infantry Division shoulder sleeve insignia (SSI)
- Active: 1877-2007
- Country: United States
- Branch: United States Army
- Type: Cavalry
- Role: Recon and assault
- Size: Battalion
- Part of: 28th Infantry Division and the Ohio National Guard
- Garrison/HQ: Stow, Ohio
- Nickname: "Panther" (special designation)
- Mottos: Facere Non Dicere (To Act, Not To Speak)
- Engagements: World War I: Ypres-Lys; Lorraine; World War II: Central Europe; Northern France; Rhineland; Northern Solomons; Luzon; Iraq
- Decorations: Meritorious Unit Commendation (4) Presidential Unit Citation Philippine Presidential Unit Citation; Republic of Korea Presidential Citation

Insignia
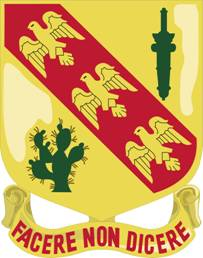
- Distinctive unit insignia

U.S. Cavalry Regiments
- Previous: Next
106th Cavalry Regiment (Illinois Army National Guard)	108th Cavalry Regiment (Georgia and Louisiana Army National Guards)

The 1st Battalion, 107th Cavalry Regiment was a unit of the Ohio Army National Guard, with troops in multiple locations throughout northeastern Ohio and has served in the United States of America's major wars and conflicts since 1898 until its inactivation on 31 August 2007.

== History ==
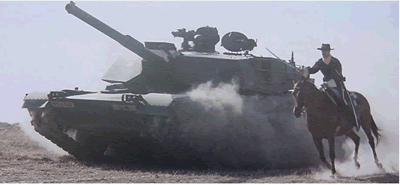
107th ACR horse soldier rides with M1 tank crew representing 107th Cavalry past & present.

The 107th Cavalry Regiment (minus 1st Squadron) reorganized on 1 May 1977 in the Ohio Army National Guard (Troop A, Support Squadron, was allotted on 1 October 1986 to the West Virginia Army National Guard and re-allotted on 15 October 1990 to the Ohio Army National Guard). It was placed on 1 June 1989 under the United States Army Regimental System consisting of the following units:

Headquarters and Headquarters Troop 107th ACR - Cleveland, OH;

1st Squadron 150th Cavalry Regiment (United States) - Bluefield, WV;

2nd Squadron 107th ACR - Akron, OH;

3rd Squadron 107th ACR - Stow, OH;

4th Squadron 107th ACR - Greensburg, OH;

Regimental Support Squadron - Medina, OH.

The 107th ACR was reorganized and redesignated on 1 September 1993 as the 1st Battalion, 107th Cavalry Regiment, Headquarters in Stow, Ohio (formerly the 3/107th ACR) and assigned to the 28th Infantry Division. The 2nd Squadron, 107th Cavalry (United States) was assigned to the 37th Armor Brigade; On 1 September 1994 the 1st Battalion, 107th Cavalry and the 2nd Squadron, 107th Cavalry, were realigned and assigned to the 37th Armor Brigade, 38th Infantry Division. In September 2001 the 1st Battalion, 107th Cavalry Regiment was once again assigned to the 28th Infantry Division.

== Coat of arms ==
Shield: Or, on a bend Gules between a Roman Sword in sheath point to base and a prickly pear cactus both Vert, three alerions of the field.

Crest: That for the regiments and separate battalions of the Ohio Army National Guard: From a wreath Or and Gules, a sheaf of seventeen arrows Argent bound by a sprig of buckeye (aesculus glabra) fructed Proper (two leaves bursting burr).

Motto: "Facere Non Dicere" (To Act, Not To Speak).

Symbolism: The shield is yellow for cavalry. The bend charged with the alerions, taken from the arms of Lorraine, is representative of World War I service and is red to indicate that the 107th Cavalry served as field artillery during World War I. The Roman Sword in sheath is for Spanish–American War service and the cactus for Mexican Border duty.

Background: The coat of arms was originally approved for the 107th Cavalry Regiment, Ohio National Guard on 8 March 1927. It was amended to correct the wording of the blazon of the shield on 17 June 1927. It was redesignated for the 107th Armored Cavalry Regiment, Ohio National Guard on 15 January 1952. The insignia was amended to add the crest of the State of West Virginia on 22 March 1971. It was amended to delete the crest of the State of West Virginia on 3 April 1975. The coat of arms was redesignated effective 1 September 1993, for the 107th Cavalry Regiment.

== Engagements ==
World War I Ypres-Lys 1918; Lorraine 1918.

World War II Central Europe; Northern France; Rhineland; Northern Solomons; Luzon (Arrowhead Device).

Operation Iraqi Freedom; 2003–2006; Transition of Iraq – 2 May 2003, to 28 June 2004; Iraqi Governance – 29 June 2004, to 15 Dec. 2005; The "National Resolution" phase – 16 Dec. 2005, to 9 Jan. 2007.

== Decorations ==
Headquarters Company (Stow), 1st Battalion, entitled to:

Meritorious Unit Commendation (Army), Streamer embroidered BOUGAINVILLE; Meritorious Unit Commendation (Army), Streamer embroidered PACIFIC THEATER; Philippine Presidential Unit Citation, Streamer embroidered 17 OCTOBER 1944 to 4 JULY 1945; Meritorious Unit Commendation (Army), Streamer embroidered IRAQ 2004–2005.

Company A (Ravenna), 1st Battalion, entitled to:

Presidential Unit Citation (Army), Streamer embroidered MANILA; Philippine Presidential Unit Citation, Streamer embroidered 17 OCTOBER 1944 to 4 JULY 1945.

Company B (Barberton), 1st Battalion, entitled to:

Presidential Unit Citation (Army), Streamer embroidered MANILA; Philippine Presidential Unit Citation, Streamer embroidered 17 OCTOBER 1944 to 4 JULY 1945.

Company C (Stow), 1st Battalion, entitled to:

Philippine Presidential Unit Citation, Streamer embroidered 17 OCTOBER 1944 to 4 JULY 1945.

Company D (Ravenna), 1st Battalion, entitled to:

Meritorious Unit Commendation (Army), Streamer embroidered KOREA 1952; Meritorious Unit Commendation (Army), Streamer embroidered KOREA 1952–1953; Philippine Presidential Unit Citation, Streamer embroidered 17 OCTOBER 1944 to 4 JULY 1945; Republic of Korea Presidential Citation, Streamer embroidered KOREA.

== Commanders ==
- LTC Kenneth R. Warner, 1993–96
- LTC Phillip Richardson, 1996–99
- LTC Donald Barbee, 1999–2000
- LTC James E. Perry, 2000–03
- LTC Richard T. Curry, 2003–06
- LTC Jeffery J. Ziol, 2006–07

== Command Sergeants Major ==
- CSM Michael Campbell, 1993–97
- CSM Timothy Johnson, 1997–2000
- CSM Albert M. Whatmough, 2000–07
- CSM Timothy Hornung, 2007

== Iraq ==
In October 2003, B and C Companies, and elements of Headquarters and Headquarters Company (HHC) and Company A, of the 1st Battalion, 107th Cavalry were activated at their home stations in Ohio and traveled to Fort Bragg, North Carolina, and Fort Stewart, Georgia, for five months of mobilization training. There they were then attached to the 1st Battalion, 150th Armor (West Virginia Army National Guard), the 1st Battalion, 252nd Armor (North Carolina Army National Guard), and Troop E, 196th Cavalry (North Carolina Army National Guard) respectively, for deployment to Operation Iraqi Freedom II with North Carolina's 30th Brigade Combat Team under the 1st Infantry Division. These elements of the 1st Battalion operated in Iraq from February to December 2004, serving in Kirkush, Tuz Khurmatu, Jalawla, and Baghdad. They participated in the Transition of Iraq and Iraqi Governance campaigns and returned home in late December, 2004.

The battalion commander LTC Richard T. Curry and CSM Albert Whatmough along with the remaining companies continued their regular training cycle until October 2004, when the remaining companies of the 1-107th Cavalry were activated for service in Operation Iraqi Freedom III. One element of HHC 1-107th CAV was then deployed to Fort Dix, New Jersey for mobilization training and left for Kuwait in January 2005. The companies operated in Baghdad, Iraq and performed detainee operations at Camps Cropper and Victory. The headquarters was deployed to Fort McCoy, Wisconsin and arrived in Kuwait in December 2004 and deployed to Mosul, Iraq in late December, this element included LTC Richard T. Curry the 1-107th Cavalry Commander and CSM Albert Whatmough who both deployed with the battalion in 2004–2005 with the mission of establishing the Forward Operating Base (FOB) Endurance which later became known as FOB Q-West Base Complex 30 Kilometers south of Mosul, Iraq. The mission the unit was to provide command & control of the base, establish the Base Defense Operations Center, provide life support functions, establish base defense security, combat patrols and build the FOB into the largest logistical hub operating in northern Iraq by the end of 2005, a mission that was accomplished prior to their departure.

The FOB Endurance/Q-West Base Complex HQ elements of the 1-107th CAV were attached to the 11th Armored Cavalry Regiment and received the Army Meritorious Unit Commendation (MUC) for their accomplishments. The HHC/A Convoy Security Company conducted operations throughout Iraq logging in thousands of miles with no fatalities and provided security for convoy elements. Elements of the 1st Battalion, 107th Cavalry served within the 1st Cavalry Division, 4th Infantry Division, and 3rd Infantry Division areas of operations as units of the 18th and 42nd MP Brigades. The final elements returned home from Iraq in January 2006 reuniting the battalion. Both HHC/A detachments received the U.S. Army Meritorious Unit Commendation for their service.

== Transformation and inactivation ==
As the U.S. Army conducted its largest organizational transformation since World War II, the 1st Battalion 107th Cavalry Regiment, along with D Company from the 1st Battalion, 148th Infantry, as well as a company from the 112th Engineer Battalion, were chosen to form a new combined arms battalion within the 37th Brigade Combat Team, 38th Infantry Division. A change in designation was required and the unit uncased the new colors of the 1st Battalion, 145th Armored Regiment, effective 1 September 2007.
