= 145th Armored Regiment =

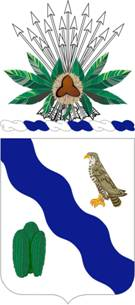
- Coat of arms
- Active: Lineage dating to 1861; 145th Infantry dates to 1921; 145th Armored Regiment dates to 2007
- Country: United States
- Branch: Ohio Army National Guard
- Type: Parent regiment under US Army Regimental System
- Size: 600 soldiers
- Part of: 37th Infantry Brigade Combat Team (Ohio higher headquarters); 1st Armored Brigade Combat Team, 34th Infantry Division (Total Army higher headquarters)
- Garrison/HQ: Stow, Ohio
- Nickname: Fifth Ohio (special designation) Steel Panthers
- Motto: Excel
- Equipment: M1A1 SA Abrams Tank M2A2 SA Bradley Fighting Vehicle
- Engagements: American Civil War; Antietam; Virginia 1862; Chancellorsville 1863; Gettysburg 1863; Chattanooga 1863; Georgia 1864; Spanish–American War; Santiago; World War I; Ypres-Lys 1918; Meuse-Argonne 1918; World War II; Central Europe; Northern France; Rhineland; Northern Solomons; Luzon (Arrowhead Device); Global war on terrorism; Expeditionary; Iraq; Transition of Iraq; Iraqi Governance

Commanders
- Battalion Commander: LTC Philip Patti
- Command Sergeant Major: CSM Gordon Cairns

Insignia
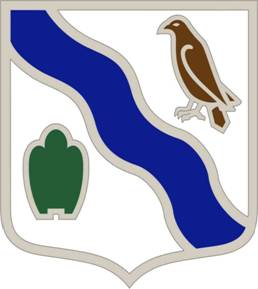
- Distinctive unit insignia: 145th Armored Regiment distinctive unit insignia

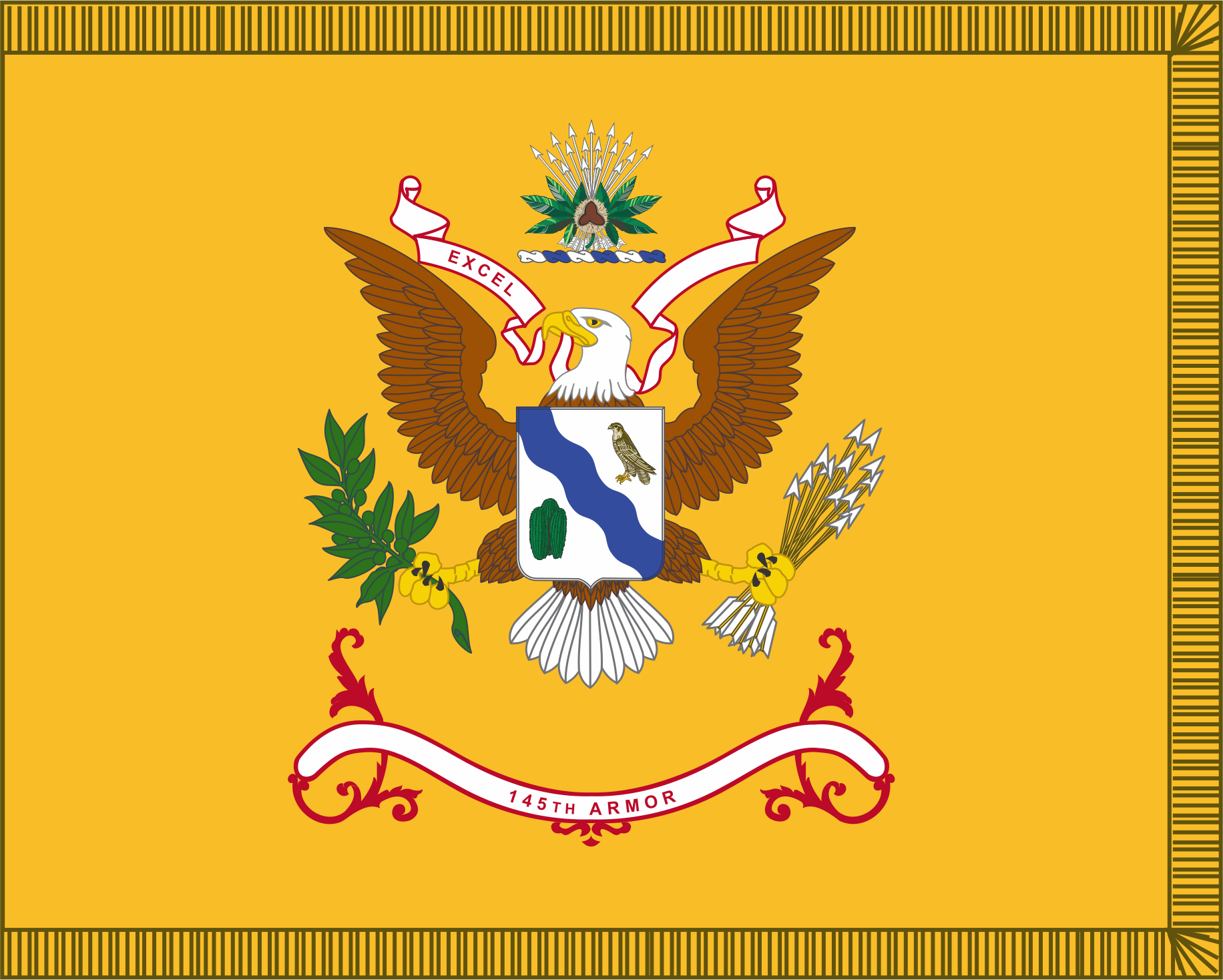
- Regimental Colors: 145th Armored Regiment colors

U.S. Infantry Regiments
- Previous: Next
144th Infantry Regiment (Texas Army National Guard)	146th Infantry Regiment (Ohio Army National Guard)

U.S. Armored Regiments
- Previous: Next
142nd Armored Regiment (Inactive, New York Army National Guard)	147th Armored Regiment (now 147th Regiment, Ohio Army National Guard)

The 145th Armored Regiment, "Fifth Ohio," Ohio Army National Guard, is a parent regiment under the U.S. Army Regimental System, with headquarters at Stow, Ohio. Only a 600-soldier combined arms battalion of the regiment, the 1st Battalion, currently exists. Its units are spread throughout northeast Ohio.

For command and control purposes within the Ohio Army National Guard, the 1st Battalion, 145th Armored Regiment, is a subordinate battalion of the 37th Infantry Brigade Combat Team. In 2013, the battalion entered into an alignment-for-training relationship with the 1st Armored Brigade Combat Team, 34th Infantry Division. In May 2016, the battalion donned the insignia of the 34th Infantry Division in anticipation of formal alignment with the 1st Armored Brigade Combat Team in September 2016. The battalion consists of two mechanized infantry companies, two armor companies, a support company, a headquarters company, and a battalion headquarters.

Its Headquarters Company (HHC) and three line companies are organic to the battalion. While combined arms battalions traditionally receive their support companies from their organic Brigade Support Battalion, since the battalion is not organic to an Brigade Combat Team, the 134th Support Company exists independently and is attached to the battalion. As of 2014, the battalion's fire support platoon was re-designated and currently exists as Detachment 2, Headquarters Battery, 1st Battalion, 125th Field Artillery, and is re-attached to the battalion.

The regiment was reorganized and re-designated from the 1st Battalion, 107th Cavalry Regiment on 1 September 2007. Since 11 September 2001, subordinate elements and individual soldiers that now comprise the unit have deployed to Operation Noble Eagle, Operation Enduring Freedom (Europe), Kosovo Force, Operation Iraqi Freedom, and Joint Task Forces Katrina and Rita. The battalion has also deployed select individual soldiers in support of the combined Hungary-United States Operational Mentor and Liaison Team with service in Afghanistan.

== Current units ==
Company	Headquarters
Headquarters and Headquarters Company (HHC)	Stow, Ohio
Detachment 2, 1-125th Field Artillery	Stow, Ohio
A Company (Armor)	Newton Falls, Ohio
B Company (Armor)	Alliance, Ohio
C Company (Infantry)	North Canton, Ohio
134th Support Company (Forward)	Stow, Ohio

== Mission, training, and capabilities ==
In support of their federal mission, soldiers of the battalion train as members of M1A1 Abrams main battle tank crews, M2A2 Bradley infantry fighting vehicle crews, and as mechanized infantry platoons, squads, and fire teams. Additionally, the battalion has a scout platoon, a 120-mm M120 heavy mortar platoon, a fire support platoon, a medical platoon, a signal section, a sniper squad, and a unit ministry team.

When training in a traditional National Guard status, the battalion will typically complete tank gunnery tables, Bradley Fighting Vehicle gunnery tables, or dismounted infantry squad and fire team training lanes. The battalion has also conducted successful training cycles providing training and validation to prepare other Ohio Army National Guard units for deployment to Iraq and Afghanistan. Additionally, the battalion incorporates elements of stability operations, support operations, and counterinsurgency operations into larger training events.

Federal mission
To maintain combat-ready units and soldiers available to mobilize in support of the National Military Strategy.
Combat mission
To close with and destroy enemy forces using fire, maneuver, and shock effect, or to repel his assault by fire and counterattack.
State mission
To provide organized, trained, and equipped units to protect life and property and to preserve peace, order and public safety when ordered by the governor.
Community mission
To participate in local, state and national programs that add value to America.

== Heraldry ==
=== Coat of arms ===
==== Heraldic description ====
- Shield: Argent, a bend wavy Azure between a falcon close and a cactus Proper.
- Crest: That for the regiments and separate battalions of the Ohio Army National Guard: From a wreath Argent and Azure, a sheaf of seventeen arrows Argent bound by a sprig of buckeye (aesculus glabra) fructed Proper (two leaves bursting burr).
- Motto: EXCEL

==== Symbolism ====
The service of the original organization, the 145th Infantry Regiment is indicated by the white shield for Infantry. The falcon from the arms of Montfaucon, France and the wavy bend for the Escaut (Scheldt) River symbolize the most outstanding feats of the regiment during World War I. The giant cactus represents service on the Mexican border.

==== Background ====
The distinctive unit insignia was originally approved for the 145th Infantry Regiment on 5 September 1928. It was amended on 27 November 1928. It was cancelled on 29 May 1935. It was reinstated and redesignated for the 145th Infantry Regiment on 19 May 1936. The insignia was redesignated with description and symbolism revised for the 145th Regiment on 15 April 1997. It was redesignated effective 1 September 2007, for the 145th Armored Regiment with the symbolism revised.

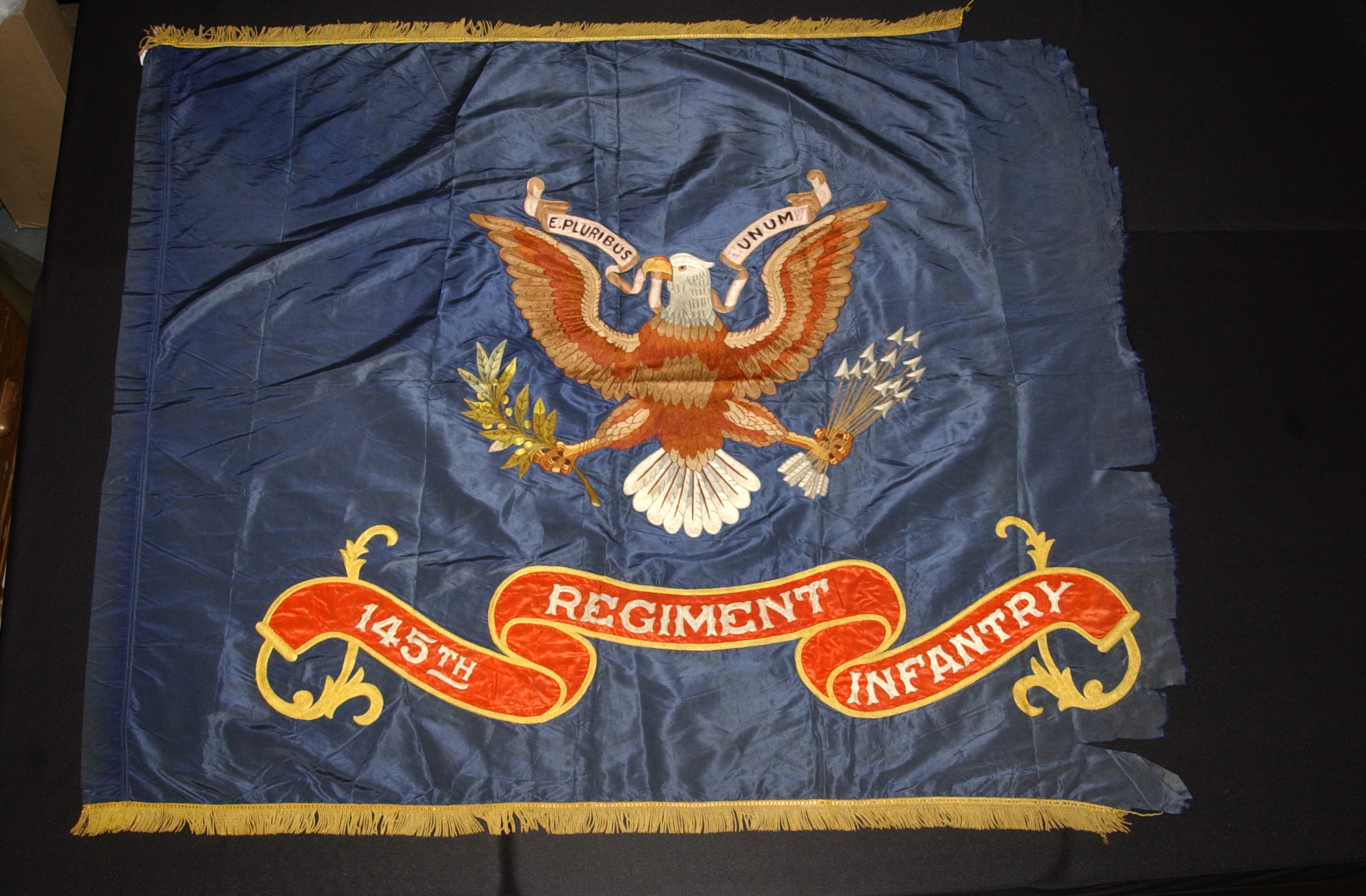
Pre-1928 Regimental Colors of the 145th Infantry Regiment

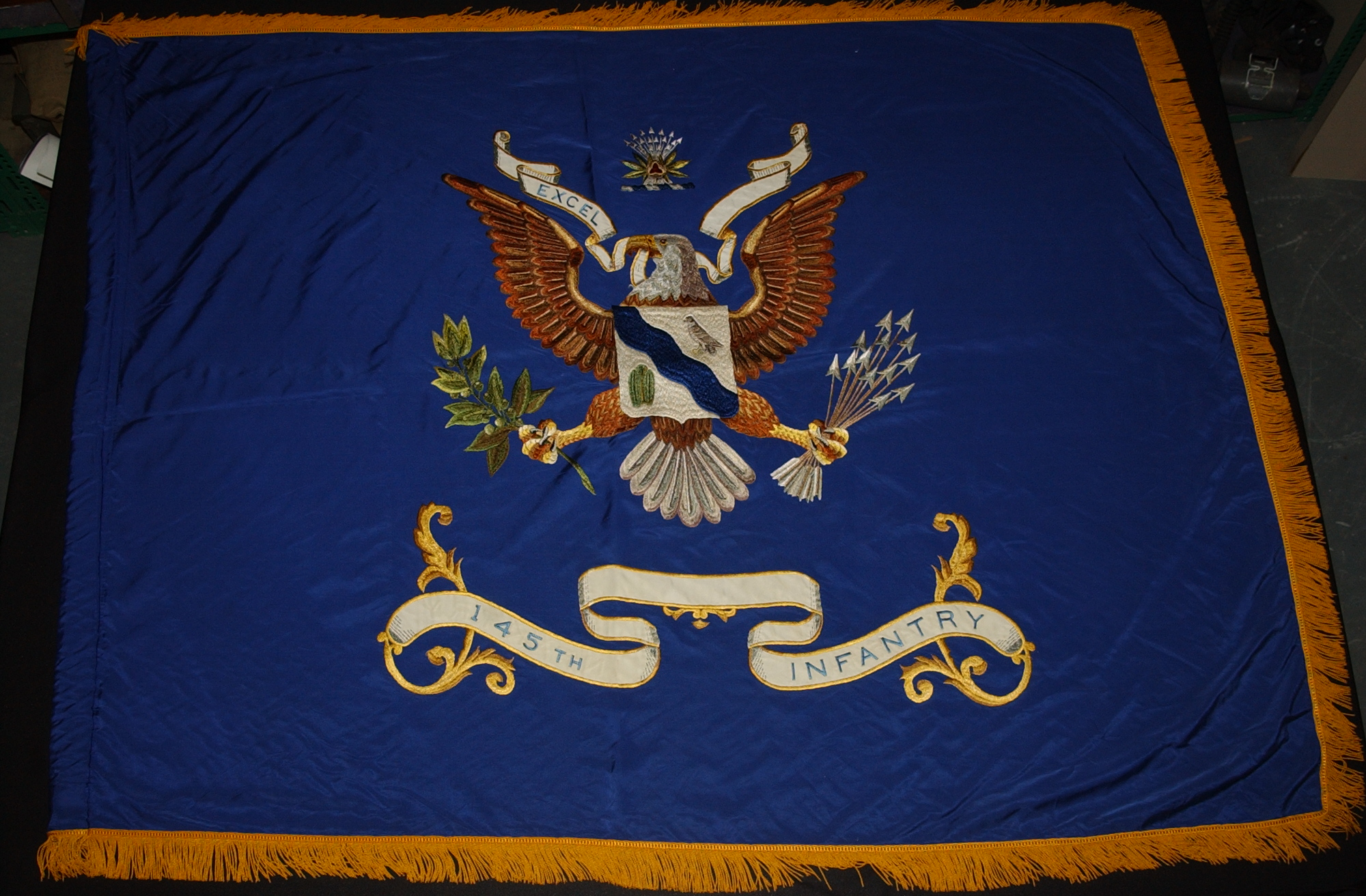
Post-1928 Regimental Colors of the 145th Infantry Regiment

== From statehood to the Civil War ==
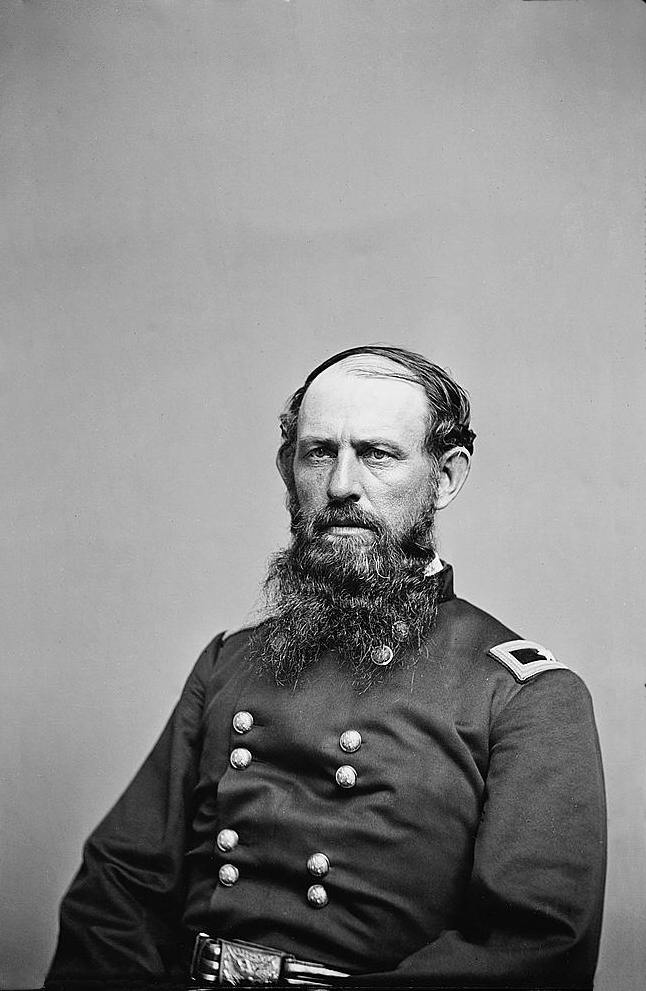
Gen. E.B. Tyler, first colonel of the 7th Ohio Volunteer Infantry.

Units of the battalion originated as independent companies of the organized militia throughout northeast Ohio. For federal service during the Civil War, the unit was organized as the 7th Regiment, Ohio Volunteer Infantry, with companies from Cleveland and northeastern Ohio. The 7th Regiment was mustered into federal service 28 April 1861 for 3 months and then reorganized for three years on 16 June 1861 at Camp Dennison, Ohio. The regiment saw action throughout the Eastern Theater with the Army of Virginia and the Army of the Potomac, until it was transferred to the Western Theater where it joined the Army of the Cumberland at the Second Battle of Chattanooga.

The 7th Regiment saw action at Antietam, Chancellorsville, Gettysburg, and in the Atlanta campaign. At the end of their three-year enlistment, soldiers of the 7th Regiment who wished to remain in service transferred to the 5th Ohio Volunteer Infantry. The regiment mustered out of federal service on 7 July 1864 in Cleveland, Ohio.

== Post–Civil War to World War I ==
Between the Civil War and World War I, units now comprising the battalion underwent numerous consolidations and reorganizations typical of a peacetime militia force. From 1870–1877, units were independent companies of the organized militia. On 30 June 1877, companies in northeastern Ohio were consolidated as the 15th Infantry Regiment, headquartered in Cleveland, Ohio. On 22 March 1881, the regiment was disbanded, with Companies D, G, H, and K remaining as independent companies. Later that year on 7 July, Companies D, G, H, K, and other elements of the organized militia were reorganized and redesignated as the 5th Infantry Regiment.

On 11 May 1898 the unit was mustered into federal service for the Spanish–American War at Camp Bushnell, Ohio as the 5th Regiment, Ohio Volunteer Infantry. Commanded by Colonel Cortland L. Kennan, the regiment had 48 officers and 1,302 enlisted men. During the war, the regiment was stationed in Tampa, Florida, and Fernandina, Florida. Due to the quick nature of the war, the regiment was mustered out of federal service at Cleveland, Ohio on 5 November 1898 and resumed status as the 5th Infantry. Between April and July 1899, the regiment was disbanded and later Companies B, C, E, F, G, H, and K were consolidated into the 5th Infantry.

With the passage of the Militia Act of 1903, initiated by Secretary of War Elihu Root and U.S. Senator Charles W. F. Dick (also a Major General in the Ohio National Guard), militia units such as the 5th Infantry were now federally funded and recognized, and brought into compliance with improvements in the militia system borne out of weaknesses observed during the Spanish–American War mobilizations.

The 5th Ohio was again mustered into Federal service on 19 June 1916 for service along the Mexican border. The regiment was mobilized at Camp Willis, near present-day Upper Arlington, Ohio, and served along the border in the vicinity of El Paso, Texas, from September 1916 until it was mustered out on 15 March 1917 at Ft. Wayne, Michigan.

== World War I ==
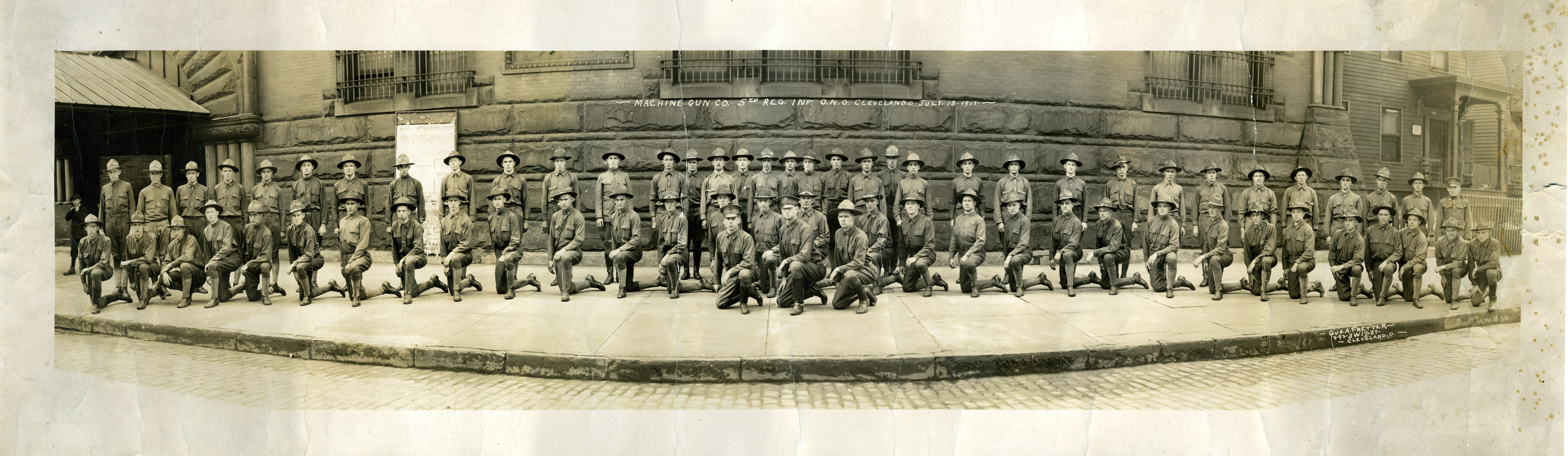
Machine Gun Company, 5th Regiment, Ohio Infantry, Ohio National Guard, in front of the Cleveland Grays Armory in Cleveland, Ohio.

For World War I, the regiment was drafted into federal service on 5 August 1917. On 25 September 1917 it was reorganized and designated the 145th Infantry Regiment of the 37th Division. In June 1918 the regiment deployed to Europe, where it fought in the Meuse-Argonne, Lorraine, and Ypres-Lys campaigns. During its service in World War I, eighteen of the regiment's officers and soldiers received the Distinguished Service Cross for extraordinary heroism fighting in France and Belgium.

== Interwar period ==
The 145th Infantry arrived at the port of New York on 27 March 1919 on the troopship USS Great Northern and was demobilized on 22 April 1919 at Camp Sherman, Ohio. Following the war, elements of the 5th Infantry and the former 8th Infantry Regiment (organized in 1876 with headquarters in Massilon, Ohio) were organized as the 3rd Infantry with headquarters federally recognized on 1 July 1920 at Cleveland, Ohio. Per the National Defense Act of 1920, the 145th Infantry was reconstituted in the National Guard in 1921, assigned to the 37th Division, and allotted to the state of Ohio. Reorganized on 1 July 1921 by redesignation of the 3rd Infantry, Ohio National Guard (organized 1919–20; headquarters organized 1 July 1920 and federally recognized at Cleveland) as the 145th Infantry. On 5 September 1928, the 145th Infantry's distinctive unit insignia was authorized. It was heavily influenced by the regiment's World War I service, displaying a wavy bend to symbolize the Scheldt (Escaut) River and a falcon from the arms of Montfaucon, France. The regiment, or elements thereof, was called up to perform the following state duties: riot control during a labor strike at New Lexington, Ohio, in July–August 1922; tornado relief duties at Lorain-Sandusky, Ohio, 28 June–16 July 1924; martial law in connection with civil disorders and KKK riots in Niles, Ohio, 2–5 November 1924; riot control during a coal miners’ strike at Cadiz, Ohio, 16 April–17 August 1932; riot control during a workers’ strike at the Auto-Lite plant at Toledo, Ohio, 23 May–2 June 1934; flood relief along the Ohio River, January–March 1937; riot control during a workers’ strike at the Mahoning Valley steel plants, 22 June 1–15 July 1937. Conducted annual summer training most years at Camp Perry, Ohio, 1921–39. Inducted into active federal service at Cleveland on 15 October 1940 and moved to Camp Shelby, Mississippi, where it arrived 22 October 1940.

== World War II ==
The 145th Infantry was inducted into federal service as part of the 37th Division (later redesignated the 37th Infantry Division "Buckeye") on 15 October 1940 and left Cleveland, Ohio for Camp Shelby, Mississippi. From Camp Shelby, the regiment moved to Louisiana to participate in the Louisiana Maneuvers of June, August, and September 1941 before returning to Camp Shelby. On 26 May 1942 the division left the San Francisco Port of Embarkation, arriving at Viti Levu, Fiji Islands exactly one month later on 11 June 1942. There, the entire division resumed training and fortified the islands against possible invasion.

As one of three infantry regiments within the 37th Division, the 145th Infantry saw a significant amount of combat and distinguished itself in the Asiatic-Pacific Theater. Although the allies enjoyed an improved strategic position after the success of Operation Watchtower on Guadalcanal, a strategically important Japanese base at Rabaul on the island of New Britain in the Bismarck Archipelago blocked any offensives toward the Philippines and Japan. In order to ultimately assault or neutralize Rabaul, the allies would first have to capture the remainder of the Solomon Islands and portions of northeast New Guinea. While an assault on Rabaul would be postponed by decision of the 1943 Pacific Military Conference, U.S. Army General Douglas A. MacArthur and U.S. Navy Admiral William F. Halsey were ordered to "begin the initial advance toward Rabaul and capture various points along the northern coast of New Guinea, New Georgia and the northern Solomons, and the Bismarcks." It was during these operations within the Northern Solomons Campaign on New Georgia and Bougainville, as part of the 37th Infantry Division, that the regiment saw most of its combat.

=== Asiatic-Pacific Theater ===
==== Northern Solomons Campaign ====
===== New Georgia =====
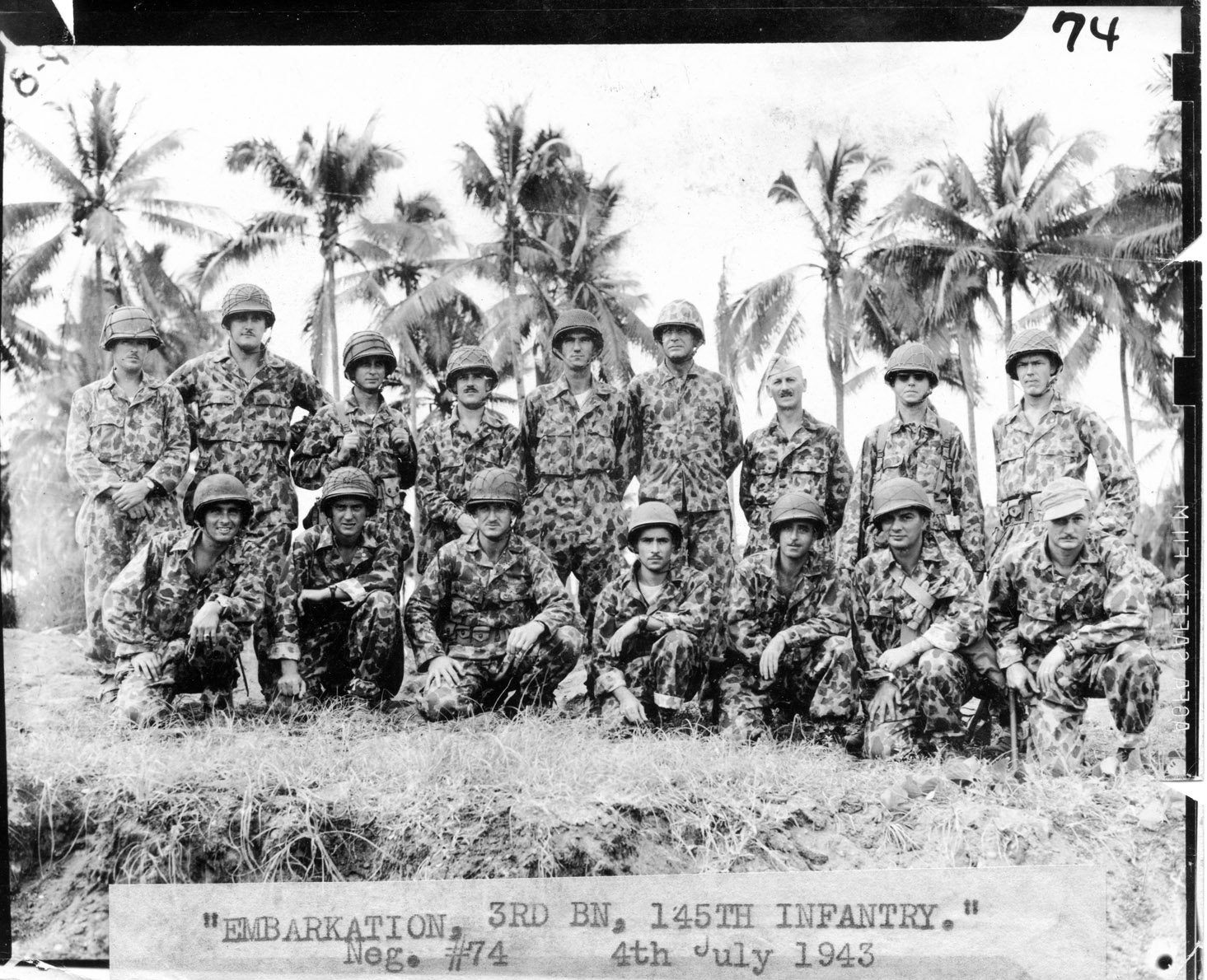
Commander of 3rd Battalion and company commanders of 145th Infantry prior to invasion of New Georgia Island

The regiment first saw combat against the Japanese during the invasion of the New Georgia islands, codenamed Operation Toenails under Admiral Halsey. There, the 145th Infantry's 3rd Battalion was tasked as part of the Northern Landing Group of the Munda-Bairoko Occupation Force, along with the Marines' 1st Raider Battalion, and the 3rd Battalion from its sister regiment, the 148th Infantry, all under the command of U.S. Marine Colonel Harry B. Liversedge. The Northern Landing Group's mission was to invade New Georgia north of Munda in order to interdict Japanese supply lines and prevent the reinforcement of Munda. On 5 July 1943 the Northern Landing Group went ashore at Rice Anchorage. Progress for Liversedge and other elements invading New Georgia was agonizingly difficult and slow due in greater part to hostile jungle terrain and weather than Japanese resistance.

By 9 July, the offensive officially began and many allied units saw limited forward progress amid harsh close combat. By 13 July, U.S. Army Major General Oscar Griswold, Commanding General of the U.S. XIV Corps, took command on 16 July and decided not to renew the offensive until reinforcements had arrived. By 25 July, the offensive was resumed as a corps-level operation with "five regiments attacking abreast", to include all three regiments of the 37th Infantry Division.

During this offensive, allied forces on New Georgia experienced jungle warfare at its worst: "the demanding, draining, and deadly task of assaulting hidden Japanese positions one by one, a style of warfare that chewed up rifle companies and became all too familiar to American ground troops in the Pacific." It was during this offensive that Major Carl F. Coleman, the regiment's operations officer noted, "enemy strong points encountered in this fashion oftentimes resulted in hasty withdrawals which were costly both in men and weapons."

By 29 July, Japanese forces had withdrawn to a final defensive line in front of the airfield after their main defenses were destroyed. As the XIV Corps advanced into the high ground protecting Munda Field to breach the Japanese line and defend against a counterattack, Private First Class Frank J. Petrarca, a medic, performed actions for which he received the Medal of Honor. Between 27 and 31 July, Petrarca repeatedly moved under enemy fire to locate, treat, and evacuate wounded soldiers, continuing his attempts to reach wounded personnel until he was killed by mortar fire.

===== Bougainville =====
By November 1943, after operations on New Georgia and elsewhere, Adm. Halsey had been ordered to seize airfield sites on the final Solomon Island of Bougainville, which was occupied by approximately 37,500 Japanese soldiers. Adm. Halsey selected the Empress Augusta Bay area on the western side of the island, where 14,000 Marines cleared a shallow 4,000-yard beachhead. It would not be until March 1944 that the Japanese realized an invasion of Bougainville would not be coming from another direction, and assembled a counterattack force of 19,000 soldiers who would not have the element of surprise.

Key to Maj. Gen. Griswold's defense of XIV Corps' 23,000-yard, 62,000-man perimeter, was two miles of jungle perimeter manned by the 3rd Marine Division and the 37th Infantry Division. Consistent with the rugged jungle terrain, this section of perimeter contained tactically important pieces of high ground which he refused to abandon after hard lessons learned at Munda. The linchpin to Maj. Gen. Griswold's perimeter was Hill 700 at the center of the line, manned by the 145th Infantry.

On 8 March 1944 the Japanese began their massive assault on Maj. Gen. Griswold's perimeter. The plan was to focus on Hill 700 in the center of the horseshoe, as well as on the east and west "corners" of the horseshoe. By 7:00 am on the 8th, the 145th Infantry's 2nd Battalion began receiving small arms fire, combined with focused artillery barrages, making it clear that the Japanese would be attacking Hill 700. By noon, the regiment's last patrol had come in and the American forces began to return artillery fire. Once the Japanese had advanced to a point too near for further American artillery fire, Japanese soldiers began scrambling uphill, setting off warning devices and booby traps.

Fighting darkness worsened by fog and rain, the regiment was aided by artificial illumination fashioned by Staff Sergeant Otis Hawkins. When Japanese soldiers approached barbed wire obstacles, SSgt. Hawkins ordered wires pulled which ignited phosphorus grenades in gallon buckets of oil, providing illumination around the perimeter. While points on the perimeter were illuminated, SSgt. Hawkins was able to direct over 600 rounds of 60 mm mortar fire and many other soldiers were able to fire on the advancing Japanese.

While the Japanese had gained a small foothold during the night and managed to harass one observation post, another observation post was overrun at great cost. Four 145th Infantry soldiers manning one mortar observation post repelled several Japanese assaults with rifles, grenades, knives, and fists until all four were killed, with twelve Japanese bodies found inside their pillbox and hundreds more in the immediate area.

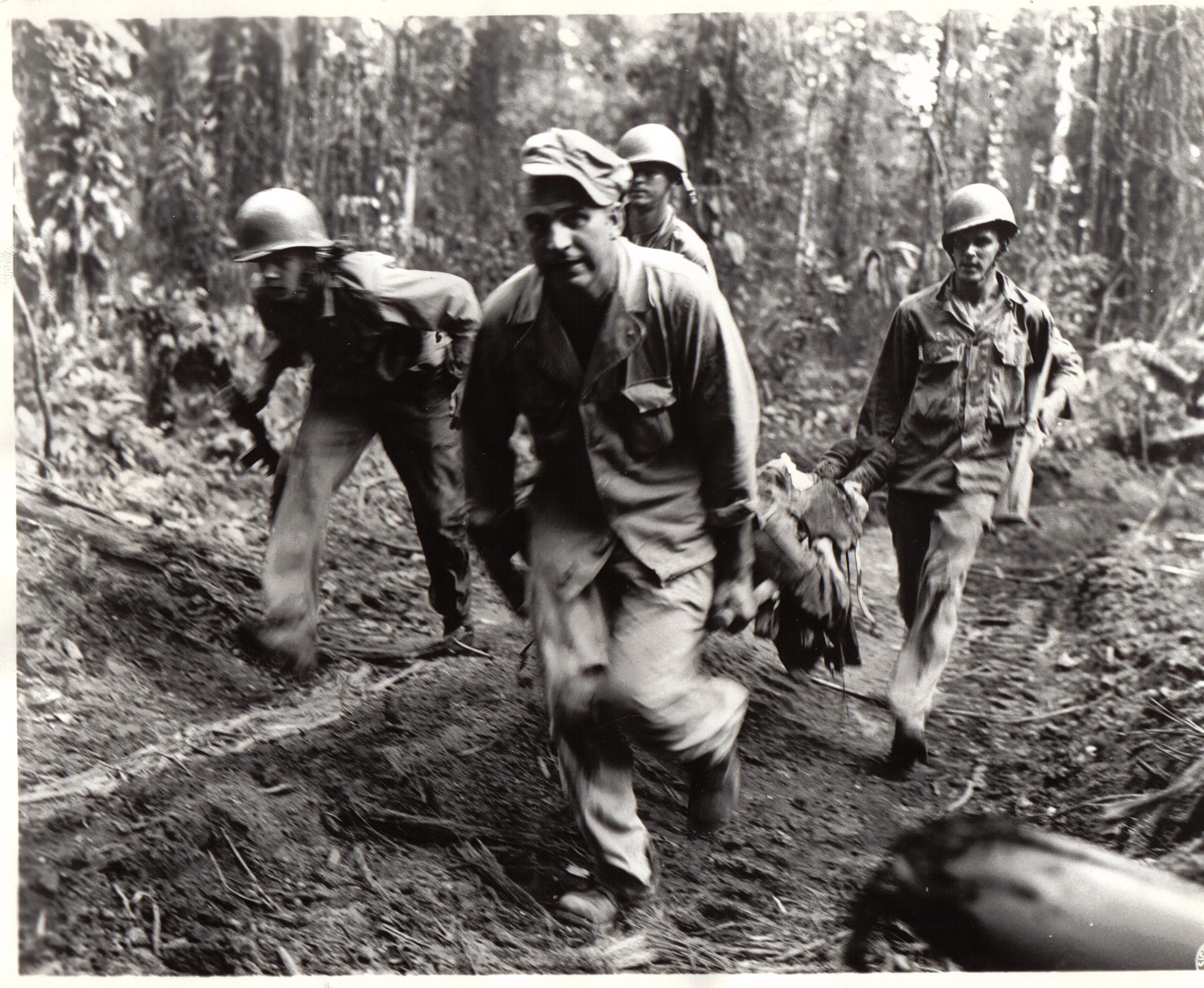
Soldiers of the 145th Infantry carry a wounded comrade off of Hill 700, Bougainville Island, March 1944.

By the morning of 9 March, the Japanese had penetrated the American lines 50 yards deep and 70 yards wide. Forward observers, directing accurate artillery and mortar fire at dangerously close distances repelled a fresh Japanese assault. By noon on 9 April, elements of the 1st and 2nd battalions, 145th Infantry, counterattacked but by 10 pm, only a few pillboxes had been regained and the Japanese still held their foothold on Hill 700. The next morning, an American 90 mm antiaircraft gun and bombers had been brought to bear on Japanese positions on the hill, coordinated with marking artillery fire. By 5 pm on the 10th, 1st and 2nd battalions mounted another counterattack and recovered all but four pillboxes from the Japanese.

At dawn on 11 March, the Japanese charged the hill brandishing sabers and screaming epithets, despite withering American machinegun and small arms fire. It was during this charge that 1st Lt. Clinton S. McLaughlin, commander of Company G, 145th Infantry, and Staff Sgt. John H. Kunkel moved from pillbox to pillbox to encourage their men and break the Japanese attack. 1st Lt. McLaughlin was wounded several times and knowingly occupied outflanked emplacements, but he and SSgt. Kunkel were credited with killing over 185 Japanese soldiers and were both later awarded the Distinguished Service Cross.

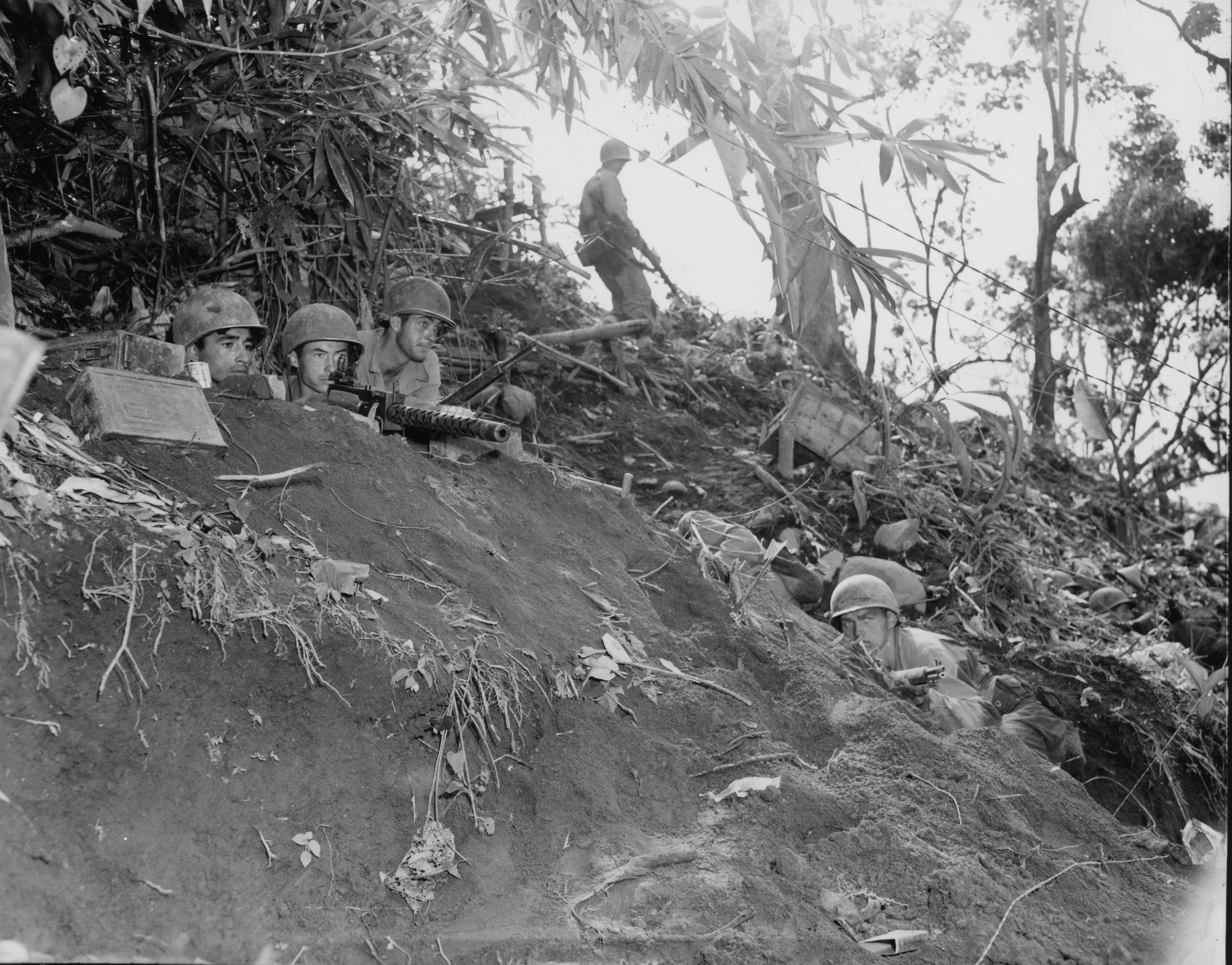
G.I.'s from Company A, 145th Infantry Regiment, 37th Division, in position on a hillside where they had the Japs surrounded, September 1944.

That afternoon, after three days of continuous combat 2nd Battalion, 148th Infantry arrived to join the 145th Infantry in regaining lost portions of the hill. Companies E, F, G, and H, 148th Infantry Regiment began operations to prevent further Japanese penetration and regain ground already taken by the Japanese. Over the next two days, 148th Infantry soldiers fought aggressively, using every weapon in their inventory – from bazookas to flamethrowers – to defeat the Japanese and regain the Hill for the Americans. By 4 pm on 12 March, the two Ohio infantry units had killed or routed the Japanese and American lines were restored.

According to one history of the battle, "Captured [Japanese] prisoners claimed that the four days of fighting had resulted in the virtual annihilation of the 2nd and 3rd battalions of the Japanese 23rd Infantry and the 13th Infantry, which had been pitted against this thin, narrow front of the 37th Infantry Division." The cooperation of the two Ohio infantry regiments lead to the successful defense of Hill 700 and the entire allied air installation at Empress Augusta Bay. The regiment remained on Bougainville until December 1944, when it would prepare for the invasion of Luzon and the liberation of Manila.

==== Luzon Campaign ====
During the Luzon Campaign in early 1945, the 145th Infantry participated in the invasion of the island of Luzon and the approach march to the Philippine capital of Manila. The assault on Luzon commenced on the morning of 9 January 1945. In the first few days, over 175,000 troops landed on the twenty-mile beachhead.

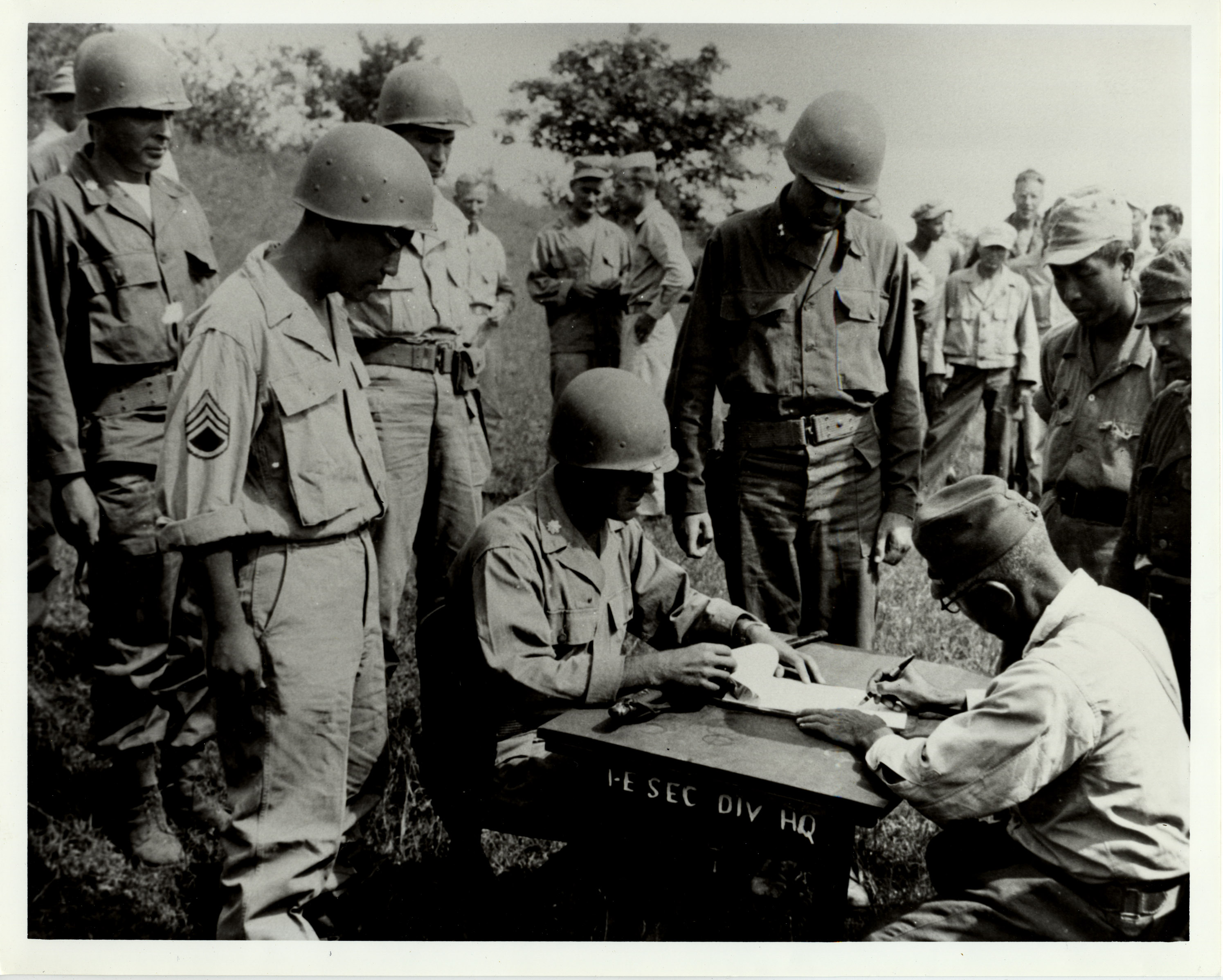
Lt. Col. Sylvester Del Corso, commander of the 1st Battalion, 145th Infantry, receives the surrender of Japanese forces on the Philippine Island of Luzon.

Despite strong Japanese opposition, by 31 January, the 145th and 148th Infantry Regiments took Clark Field on Luzon. By 4 February, the 37th Infantry Division and the 1st Cavalry Division had encircled and begun to enter Manila from the north. The 37th Infantry Division moved south along the coast of Manila Bay, with the 1st Cavalry Division moving south to the east of the 37th. The Battle of Manila provided some of the worst urban combat of the entire Pacific theater.

On 8 February, elements of the 37th Infantry Division crossed south over the Pasig River, a major obstacle dividing Manila. Both Provisor Island, a small industrial island in the middle of the Pasig River, and the Paco railway station were scenes of intense fighting for the 37th Infantry Division. The Paco railway station itself took ten assaults before it was taken by the Americans. Provisor Island and the Paco station on 9 and 10 February accounted for 45 killed and 307 wounded in the 37th Infantry Division.

On 17 February, the 145th Infantry relieved the 129th Infantry Regiment on the eighth day of the 129th Infantry's siege of the New Police Station. By 20 February, the police station was taken, and the 145th Infantry and armored support conducted repeated grueling combined arms assaults of Japanese strong points until 23 February when allied forces converged on the Japanese walled, old-city stronghold of Intramuros.

The regiment stormed Intramuros through the Quezon and Parian Gates, and by 10:30 am had secured an area of several blocks inside the city from the gate. Their progress became slowed by a flood of civilian women and children. By the evening of the 23rd, two blocks short of the city walls that were their objective, the regiment had suffered 15 killed and 45 wounded, with approximately 200 enemy killed in the process.

The morning of 24 February, the remaining Japanese in the regiment's sector were in the aquarium off the southwest corner of Intramuros. Walled-off and easily defensible, the aquarium was where Company C, 145th Infantry utilize a tunnel as an assault route into the aquarium. According to one history, "The final assault began at 1600 [hours]. An hour and a half and 115 dead Japanese later, the 145th Infantry had overcome the last organized resistance within Intramuros."

By 3 March, the 37th Infantry Division had secured Manila. The pace of operations slowed while the 37th Infantry Division was temporarily reassigned directly to Sixth U.S. Army for stability and support operations within Manila. By April 30, the 145th Infantry relieved the 6th Division in Montalban to capture Wawa Dam which resulted into a seesaw battle during the course of the month of May, and ultimately completion of the objective. The 145th Infantry remained in Manila while the division moved to northwest Luzon and did not rejoin it until 2 June. Taking Bagabag on 9 June, the regiment continued to participate in mop-up operations through the end of the Luzon Campaign on 30 June.

== Postwar era ==
Overall, for their fighting in the Northern Solomons and Luzon Campaigns, soldiers in the regiment received twenty-one Distinguished Service Crosses and one Medal of Honor. On 13 December 1945 the regiment returned to the Los Angeles Port of Embarkation and was inactivated at Camp Anza, California. Back in northeast Ohio, the 145th Infantry was reorganized and federally recognized on 21 November 1946. A combination of combat veterans and new recruits filled the ranks of the regiment.

One recruit in Company C was a young John Carroll University football player named Don Shula, who would later have one of the finest coaching careers in the National Football League. On 15 January 1952, Sergeant Shula and the rest of the 145th Infantry again headed south for active service, this time to Camp Polk, Louisiana. The Korean War was in its second year and the Army again called on the Ohio National Guard. The division led a vigorous basic training of its soldiers and prepared to go to war. By the summer of 1952, it was clear that Washington had no plans to send multiple National Guard divisions on federal service to war as whole units, and began sending individual soldiers to Korea from the regiment.

In January 1954, 145th Infantry units began reorganizing in northeast Ohio armories with the formation being complete for a 15 June ceremony at Camp Perry. As the Army sought ways to fight on the modern, atomic battlefield, the 145th Infantry underwent a series of reorganizations from 1959 to 1968, when the 37th Infantry Division cased its colors. By 15 February 1968, only the 1st Battalion, 145th Infantry remained. The non-divisional battalion was headquartered at the old Akron armory in the city's downtown. A move to the new First Sergeant Robert A. Pinn Armory in Stow, Ohio, followed that fall.

On 4 May 1970, Company A of the 1st Battalion, 145th Infantry, along with Troop G of the 2d Squadron, 107th Armored Cavalry of the Ohio ARNG participated in the attempted dispersion of a crowd of student protesters at Kent State University in Kent, Ohio (the Kent State shootings), firing on the protesters, killing 4 and wounding 9 others.

On 1 June 1974 the 1st Battalion, 145th Infantry, was consolidated with the 107th Armored Cavalry, with the nucleus of the former organization becoming the 3rd Squadron, 107th Armored Cavalry. The 107th Armored Cavalry had a long and distinguished history of service, dating back to its organization as three independent cavalry troops in 1877. During World War I, the regiment served as the 135th and 136th Field Artillery Battalions during the Lorraine Campaign. Following the war, it was reorganized as the 107th Cavalry, with headquarters first in Cincinnati, then in Cleveland. During World War II, the regiment was reorganized as the 107th Cavalry Group and the 22nd and 107th Cavalry Reconnaissance Squadrons, the latter serving in the European Theater.

Throughout the remainder of the Cold War, the 107th Armored Cavalry trained and prepared for the anticipated armored showdown with the Red Army in Europe. Through its training, it gained a reputation as one of the premiere Armored Cavalry Regiments in the army's inventory. However, as communism fell and coalition forces quickly disposed of the Iraqi Army during the Gulf War, the need for heavy, armored formations faded away. In September 1993, the 107th Armored Cavalry reorganized as a single tank battalion under the 107th Cavalry designation.

The 1st Battalion, 107th Cavalry, was originally assigned to the 28th Infantry Division ("Keystone") of the Pennsylvania Army National Guard, before switching to the 38th Infantry Division ("Cyclone") in Indiana in 1994. Also in 1994, the 2nd Squadron, 107th Cavalry, then a divisional cavalry squadron, was reorganized in southwest Ohio from elements of the 372nd Engineer Battalion.

== Twenty-first century ==
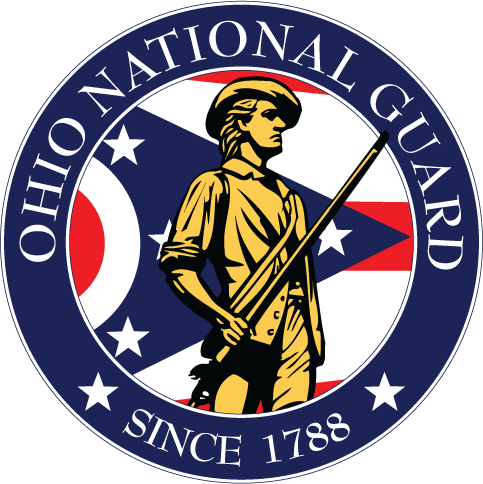
Emblem of the Ohio National Guard.

Since the September 11 terrorist attacks of 2001, soldiers and units now comprising the 1st Battalion, 145th Armored Regiment, have been active in many domestic and expeditionary federal missions. In October 2003, B and C Companies, and elements of Headquarters and Headquarters Company (HHC) and Company A, of the 1st Battalion, 107th Cavalry were activated at their home stations and traveled to Fort Bragg, North Carolina, and Fort Stewart, Georgia, for five months of mobilization training. There they were then attached to the 1st Battalion, 150th Armor (West Virginia Army National Guard), the 1st Battalion, 252nd Armor (North Carolina Army National Guard), and Troop E, 196th Cavalry (North Carolina Army National Guard) respectively, for deployment to Operation Iraqi Freedom II with North Carolina's 30th Brigade Combat Team under the 1st Infantry Division. These elements of the 1st Battalion operated in Iraq from February to December 2004, serving in Kirkush, Tuz Khurmatu, Jalawla, and Baghdad. They participated in the Transition of Iraq and Iraqi Governance campaigns and returned home in late December 2004.

In 2006-07, the 1st Battalion, along with a company from the 1st Battalion, 148th Infantry, as well as a company from the 112th Engineer Battalion, were chosen to form a new combined arms battalion within the 2nd Brigade Combat Team, 28th Infantry Division. A change in designation was required and the unit uncased the new colors of the 1st Battalion, 145th Armored Regiment, effective 1 September 2007.

The first deployment of the 1st Battalion, 145th Armored Regiment in its current form was the 2009 Multinational Force and Observers MFO-52 mission responsible for multiple observation posts throughout Egypt's Sinai Peninsula and the operation of MFO South Camp at Sharm el Sheik, Egypt, in partnership with ten other participating nations.

In January 2019, the battalion routine higher headquarters was the 1st Armored Brigade Combat Team, 34th Infantry Division. However, it was attached to the 30th Armored Brigade Combat Team for deployment to the Middle East to fight in Operation Enduring Freedom.

== Campaigns, decorations, Medal of Honor ==
=== Campaigns ===
The lineage and honors of National Guard units often reflect campaigns and honors won by units which hail from certain communities regardless of whether or not the roles or numerical designations of the units remain the same. This is true of the 145th, as its campaign participation credit reflects its consolidation with the 107th Cavalry in the three Europe-Africa-Middle East Theater campaigns listed below.

- Campaign participation credit
  - Civil War (Union Service) – Antietam
  - Civil War (Union Service) – Virginia 1862
  - Civil War (Union Service) – Chancellorsville 1863
  - Civil War (Union Service) – Gettysburg 1863
  - Civil War (Union Service) – Chattanooga 1863
  - Civil War (Union Service) – Georgia 1864
  - War with Spain – Santiago
  - World War I – Ypres-Lys 1918
  - World War I – Lorraine 1918
  - World War I – Meuse-Argonne 1918
  - World War II – Europe-Africa-Middle East Theater – Central Europe
  - World War II – Europe-Africa-Middle East Theater – Northern France
  - World War II – Europe-Africa-Middle East Theater – Rhineland
  - World War II – Asiatic-Pacific Theater – Northern Solomons
  - World War II – Asiatic-Pacific Theater – Luzon (Arrowhead Device)
  - Global War on Terrorism Campaign (9 November 2008 to 14 September 2009)
  - Global War on Terrorism- Operation Enduring Freedom (2019-2020)

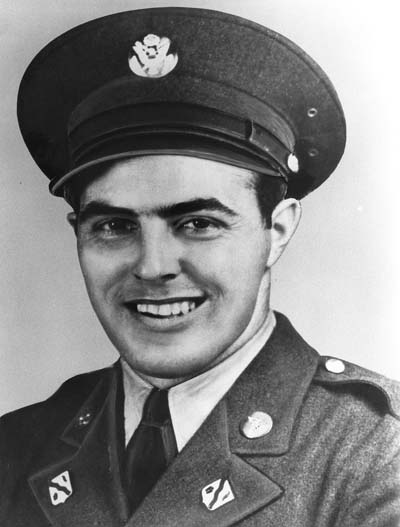
Private First Class Frank J. Petrarca.

=== Decorations ===
  - Philippine Presidential Unit Citation (17 October 1944 to 4 July 1945)

=== Medal of Honor recipients ===
- Private First Class Frank J. Petrarca
  - Place of entry into active duty: Cleveland, Ohio
  - Unit of Assignment: Medical Detachment, 145th Infantry Regiment, 37th Infantry Division
  - Summary: Awarded the Medal of Honor for conspicuous gallantry and intrepidity in action above and beyond the call of duty between 27–31 July 1943 on New Georgia, Solomon Islands.

=== Notable members ===
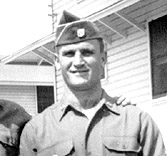
Sgt. Donald F. "Don" Shula.

- Sergeant Donald F. "Don" Shula
  - Place of Entry into Active Duty: Cleveland, Ohio
  - Period of Service: January–November 1952 (Korean War era)
  - Unit of Assignment:145th Infantry Regiment
  - Summary: Famed coach of the Miami Dolphins, the team he led to two Super Bowl victories, and to the National Football League's only perfect season. Shula was named 1993 Sportsman of the Year by Sports Illustrated. He currently holds the NFL record for most career wins with 347. Shula only had two losing seasons (below .500) in his 32-year career.

== Leaders ==
Following is a list of commanders of the units which carry the lineage and honors of today's 1st Battalion, 145th Armored Regiment. As illustrated, the unit repeatedly transformed after World War II to conform to the Army's pentomic division concept, and later to the ROAD (Reorganization Objective Army Divisions) concept. When commanders of multiple battalions or battle groups are listed with overlapping periods of command, it is because those units all carry the lineage and honors of the 1st Battalion, 145th Armored Regiment.

=== Commanders ===
Commander	Unit	Dates of command
Col. Albert W. Davis	145th Infantry Regiment	1917
Col. Sanford B. Stanberry	145th Infantry Regiment	1917–1918
Col. Frank C. Gerlach	145th Infantry Regiment	1918
Col. Ludwig S. Conelly	145th Infantry Regiment	1921–1929
Col. William L. Marlin	145th Infantry Regiment	1929–1937
Col. Luke P. Wolford	145th Infantry Regiment	1937–1943
Col. Temple G. Holland	145th Infantry Regiment	1943
Col. Cecil B. Whitcomb	145th Infantry Regiment	1943–1945
Col. Loren G. Windom	145th Infantry Regiment	1945
Col. Sylvester T. Del Corso	145th Infantry Regiment	1945–1952
Col. Ernest E. Root	145th Infantry Regiment	1954–1957
Col. John F. Lovko	145th Infantry Regiment	1957–1959
Col. John F. Lovko	1st Battle Group, 145th Infantry	1959–1962
Col. Herber L. Minton	1st Battle Group, 145th Infantry	1962–1963
Col. Kermit A. Patchen	1st Battle Group, 145th Infantry	1963
Col. Erwin C. Hostetler	2nd Battle Group, 145th Infantry	1959–1963
Lt. Col. John Majerczak	1st Battalion, 145th Infantry	1963–1968
Lt. Col. David D. Carter	2nd Battalion, 145th Infantry	1963–1966
Lt. Col. Robert E. Davis	2nd Battalion, 145th Infantry	1966–1968
Lt. Col. William F. Smith	3rd Battalion, 145th Infantry	1963–1966
Lt. Col. Robert C. Sample	3rd Battalion, 145th Infantry	1966–1968
Lt. Col. Robert C. Sample	1st Battalion, 145th Infantry	1968–1970
Lt. Col. Raymond R. Galloway	1st Battalion, 145th Infantry	1970–1972
Lt. Col. Arthur E. Wallach	1st Battalion, 145th Infantry	1972–1974
Col. Jeffrey J. Ziol	1st Battalion, 145th Armored Regiment	2007–2010
Lt. Col. Corwin J. Lusk	1st Battalion, 145th Armored Regiment	2010–2013
Lt. Col, Perry M. Carper II	1st Battalion, 145th Armored Regiment	2013–2015
Lt. Col. Kenneth J. Ratliff	1st Battalion, 145th Armored Regiment	2015–2017
Lt. Col. Charles J. Buchanan	1st Battalion, 145th Armored Regiment	2017-2019
Lt. Col. Michael M. Yates	1st Battalion, 145th Armored Regiment	2019-2023
Lt. Col. Phillip J. Patti	1st Battalion, 145th Armored Regiment	2023-Present

=== Command Sergeants Major ===
Command Sergeant Major	Unit	dates
Cmd. Sgt. Maj. Robert H. Hughes	1st Battalion, 145th Infantry	1968–1972
Cmd. Sgt. Maj. Timothy A. Hornung	1st Battalion, 145th Armored Regiment	2007–2008
Cmd. Sgt. Maj. David L. Adams	1st Battalion, 145th Armored Regiment	2008–2013
Cmd. Sgt. Maj. Jeffrey T. Schuster	1st Battalion, 145th Armored Regiment	2013–2015
Cmd. Sgt. Maj. Michael D. Burress	1st Battalion, 145th Armored Regiment	2015–2020
Cmd. Sgt. Maj. Gregory K. Durenberger	1st Battalion, 145th Armored Regiment	2020–2023
Cmd. Sgt. Maj. Gordon L. Cairns	1st Battalion, 145th Armored Regiment	2024–Present
