= Edward Vollrath =

American judge and National Guard brigadier general

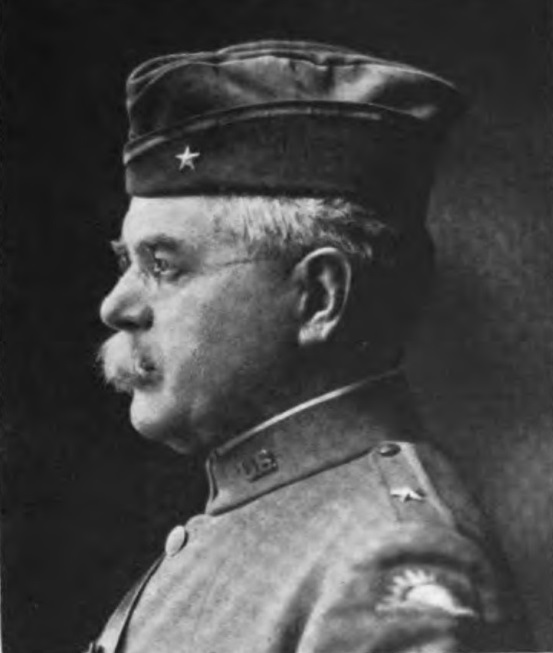
- From 1921's Bench and Bar of Northern Ohio

Judge of the Ohio Circuit Court for the Third Circuit
- In office December 3, 1904 – February 8, 1906
- Preceded by: William T. Mooney
- Succeeded by: Michael Donnelly

Personal details
- Born: Charles Edward Vollrath; June 28, 1858 Bucyrus, Ohio, U.S.
- Died: January 31, 1931 (aged 72) Bucyrus, Ohio
- Resting place: Oakwood Cemetery, Bucyrus, Ohio
- Party: Republican
- Spouse: Permilla Kate "Millie" Wise (m. 1888)
- Children: 5
- Education: Wittenberg College (attended); Princeton University, (BA, MA)
- Profession: Attorney

Military service
- Allegiance: United States
- Service: Infantry Branch
- Years of service: 1884–1898, 1899–1917 (National Guard); 1898, 1917–1919 (Army); 1919–1931 (Reserve)
- Rank: Brigadier General
- Unit: Ohio National Guard; Organized Reserve Corps
- Commands: Company A, 8th Ohio Infantry Regiment; 2nd Battalion, 8th Ohio Infantry Regiment; 8th Ohio Infantry Regiment; 66th Depot Brigade; 66th Field Artillery Brigade; 82nd Infantry Brigade; 41st Division
- Conflicts: Spanish–American War; Pancho Villa Expedition; World War I Occupation of the Rhineland
- Awards: Order of the Black Star (Commander) (France)

Edward Vollrath (June 28, 1858 – January 21, 1931) was an American attorney and military officer from Bucyrus, Ohio. A veteran of the Spanish–American War, Pancho Villa Expedition, World War I, and Occupation of the Rhineland, he was most notable for his command of the 8th Ohio Volunteer Infantry in Cuba during the war with Spain and on the Mexican border during the Villa expedition, and his First World War command of the 82nd Infantry Brigade, a unit of the 41st Division.

A native and lifelong resident of Bucyrus, Ohio, Vollrath attended the local schools and Wittenberg College, then graduated from Princeton University with bachelor's (1883) and master's (1886) degrees. He studied law with a Bucyrus attorney, attained admission to the bar in 1885, and practiced in Bucyrus. Vollrath was also active in the Lutheran church and several civic and fraternal organizations, in addition to taking part in several business ventures. Active in politics as a Republican, he was an unsuccessful candidate for offices including prosecuting attorney and city solicitor. From 1904 to 1906 he filled by appointment a seat on Ohio's Third Circuit Court, and he was an unsuccessful candidate for a full term.

Vollrath was a longtime member of the Ohio National Guard. Beginning his career as a private in 1884, he soon received his commission as a captain, and he advanced through the ranks as he served in the Spanish–American War, Pancho Villa Expedition, and World War I. During the First World War, he commanded several brigades in the 41st Division as a brigadier general and he acted as division commander on several occasions. After the war, Vollrath maintained his military membership by joining the Organized Reserve Corps.

Following his wartime service, Vollrath continued to practice law, and he maintained an active caseload until becoming ill just a few days before his death. He died in Bucyrus on January 21, 1931, and was buried at Oakwood Cemetery in Bucyrus.

== Early life ==
Charles Edward Vollrath was born in Bucyrus, Ohio on June 28, 1858, the son of Charles Franklin Vollrath and Eva Elizabeth (Hocker) Vollrath. Vollrath's parents were German immigrants, and he spoke both English and German. He was educated in the public schools of Bucyrus, and graduated from Bucyrus High School in 1878. Vollrath's father was a master woodworker, and during his high school years, Vollrath trained under him as a joiner and cabinetmaker.

Vollrath attended Wittenberg College from 1879 to 1881, then transferred to Princeton University. He received his Bachelor of Arts degree from Princeton in 1883, and his Master of Arts in 1886. After receiving his bachelor's degree, Vollrath began to study law in the Bucyrus office of attorney Ebenezer B. Finley. He was admitted to the bar in 1885 and began to practice in Bucyrus.

== Career ==
=== Legal and political career ===
In addition to practicing law in Bucyrus, Vollrath was active in politics as a Republican. In 1884, he was elected secretary of the Republican committee in Crawford County, and he later served as chairman. Vollrath was a delegate to numerous local, county, and state party conventions, and was frequently selected for leadership roles including secretary and credentials committee member. In 1886, he was the Republican nominee for city solicitor. In 1887, he was the party's candidate for prosecuting attorney of Crawford County.

In 1891, Vollrath was the Republican nominee judge of the court of common pleas. In 1899, he was again the Republican nominee for county prosecutor. In 1902 he was his party's nominee for city solicitor. In 1904, he was the Republican nominee for common pleas court judge.

In December 1904, Governor Myron T. Herrick appointed Vollrath to fill a vacancy as Judge of the Ohio Circuit Court for the Third Circuit. According to Lieutenant Governor Warren G. Harding, Herrick made the appointment because he was favorably impressed with Vollrath's conduct as judge advocate (prosecutor) during the courts-martial of several Ohio National Guard members following the Springfield, Ohio riots that took place after the Lynching of Richard Dickerson earlier in 1904. He was an unsuccessful candidate to complete the term in November 1905, losing to Michael Donnelly, and served until February 1906. In 1906, he was the Republican nominee for a full term, and lost again to Donnelly.

In 1912, Vollrath was his party's nominee for county prosecuting attorney. In 1920, he was an unsuccessful candidate for the Republican nomination for Chief Justice of the Ohio Supreme Court. Vollrath was an alternate delegate to the 1924 Republican National Convention.

=== Business career ===
Vollrath was also active in several business ventures, including serving as secretary and a member of the board of directors for the Bucyrus Silver Plate Company. In addition, he served on the board of directors of the Peoples' Savings, Building, and Loan Company. With his brothers, he was the owner and operator of a lumber mill that specialized in the manufacture of red cedar shingles. Vollrath also became one of the owners of the Bucyrus Telegraph newspaper, and served as its corporate secretary and treasurer. In addition, he dealt in real estate, including building lots, homes, and commercial buildings.

=== Civic and fraternal career ===
Throughout his life, Vollrath was active in civic and fraternal organizations. In the 1880s, he was one of the managers of the city's opera house. He served as secretary of the Shakespeare Circle in Bucyrus, as well as taking a leading role in the city's Chautauqua Circle. He was also a longtime member of the Knights of Pythias, American Legion, Military Order of Foreign Wars, and Reserve Officers Association. Following his service in Cuba, Vollrath became active in the United Spanish War Veterans. Vollrath was also a member of the Society of the Army of Santiago de Cuba, and authored for the organization a history of the 8th Ohio's Spanish–American War service.

Vollrath was a devout Lutheran, and held leadership positions in the Bucyrus church throughout his life, including Sunday school superintendent, elder, and deacon. He was an active member of the National Guard Association of Ohio, and held leadership roles including first vice president and president. In 1902, Vollrath was elected to the Wittenberg College board of directors. In 1902, he was elected president of the Bucyrus YMCA.

== Military career ==
=== Early career ===
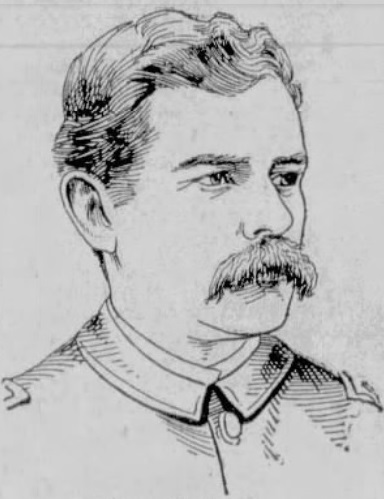
Vollrath as a captain in 1891

In April 1884, Vollrath joined the Ohio National Guard's Company A, 8th Infantry Regiment as a private. In June, he was promoted to regimental sergeant major. In June 1886, he received his commission as a captain when he was appointed to command the regiment's Company A. In March 1888, he was a candidate for the regiment's junior major position and was defeated by Charles W. F. Dick. (Note: From the 1600s to the early 1900s, militia and National Guard companies elected their lieutenants and captains, and the company officers elected the regimental majors, lieutenant colonel, and colonel.) In June 1892, he was again a candidate for a vacant major's position, and he was easily elected. After his promotion, Vollrath was assigned to command the 8th Regiment's 2nd Battalion.

Vollrath was called to active duty at the start of the Spanish–American War and was appointed as assistant adjutant general of the Ohio National Guard. He was subsequently assigned as provost marshal on the staff of the Second Army Corps at Camp Alger, Virginia. He rejoined his regiment shortly before it departed for Cuba, and he took part in combat including the Siege of Santiago. At the end of hostilities, the 8th Ohio Infantry was transported to Camp Wickoff, New York for demobilizing. The regiment traveled to Wooster, Ohio in October, and was mustered out in November. In July 1899, Dick was elected commander of the 8th Ohio with the rank of colonel, and Vollrath was elected to succeed him as the regiment's lieutenant colonel and second-in-command.

=== Continued career ===
In December 1899, Dick was promoted to brigadier general as commander of the Ohio National Guard's 2nd Brigade, and Vollrath was promoted to colonel and commander of the 8th Ohio Infantry. In the summer of 1900, Vollrath volunteered his regiment for federal service during the U.S. response to the Boxer Rebellion. The 8th Ohio was not called up, and attended its August summer encampment as scheduled. The 8th Ohio was nicknamed "McKinley's Own" because it included units from President William McKinley's hometown of Canton, Ohio and surrounding communities. In March 1901, the regiment traveled to Washington, D.C. under Vollrath's command so it could participate in the Second inauguration of William McKinley. The regiment participated in the inauguration at its own expense, but in 1902, the Ohio legislature passed a law to reimburse members who had contributed to the effort.

Vollrath continued to command the 8th Ohio, and became Ohio's senior regimental commander. His regiment was called out several times in response to violence during labor strikes, including Bridgeport in December 1909. In March 1913, Vollrath was in command when his regiment was called to active service as part of the state's response to flooding in and around Dayton. In June 1916, he led his command when it was mobilized for service on the Mexican border during the Pancho Villa Expedition. In the fall of 1916, the 8th Ohio traveled to Texas, where it was assigned to Camp Pershing near El Paso. The regiment continued to be based at Camp Pershing while soldiers performed guard and patrol duties along the border with Mexico. In October, Vollrath suffered a broken arm in an auto accident, but he continued in command. The 8th Ohio completed its federal service in March 1917 and returned to Ohio.

=== Later career ===
In August 1917, units of the Ohio National Guard, including the 8th Ohio Infantry Regiment, were mobilized for World War I, and Vollrath was promoted to brigadier general. He was subsequently assigned to command the 66th Depot Brigade at Camp Fremont, California, a unit of the 41st Division, which was responsible for the mobilization and training of soldiers activated for wartime service. In September he was assigned to command the division's 66th Artillery Brigade. He was subsequently appointed to command the 41st Division's 82nd Infantry Brigade, which he led in France. Vollrath also acted as commander of the 41st Division on several occasions, including August 3 to 19, 1918, October 24 to 29, 1918, and December 27 to 29, 1918. The 41st Division did not enter combat as a unit, instead providing replacement soldiers for other divisions, and Vollrath oversaw the training of numerous soldiers subsequently sent to the front lines. After the end of the war in November 1918, Vollrath remained in Europe as part of the U.S. Occupation of the Rhineland, and he returned to the United States in February 1919.

In August 1919, he transferred his military membership to the Organized Reserve Corps, in which he was commissioned as a brigadier general. In March 1920, the government of France awarded him the Order of the Black Star (Commander) to recognize his wartime service and achievements. In August 1929, Vollrath was commissioned as a brigadier general in the Auxiliary Reserve.

== Death and burial ==
Vollrath continued to practice law until he became ill with pneumonia a few days before his death. He died at his home in Bucyrus on January 21, 1931. Vollrath was buried at Oakwood Cemetery in Bucyrus.

== Family ==
In 1888, Vollrath married Permilla Kate "Millie" Wise (1861–1910) of Bucyrus. They remained married until her death and were the parents of five children: Jeanne, Edna, Carroll, Victor, and Edward Jr.

== Dates of rank ==
The effective dates of Vollrath's promotions were:

- Private, April 30, 1884
- Sergeant Major, June 24, 1884
- Captain, June 30, 1886
- Major, July 5, 1892
- Lieutenant Colonel, August 14, 1899
- Colonel, December 23, 1899
- Brigadier General, August 5, 1917
