= Ebenezer B. Finley =

American politician

Ebenezer Byron Finley
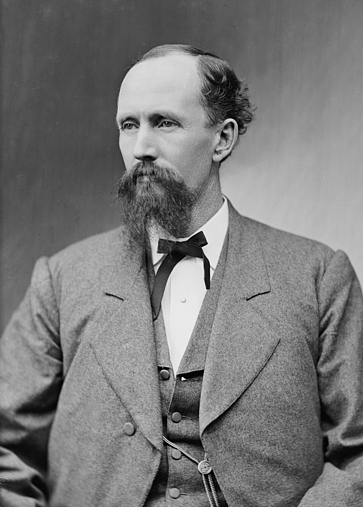

Member of the U.S. House of Representatives from Ohio
- In office March 4, 1877 – March 3, 1881
- Preceded by: Jacob P. Cowan
- Succeeded by: J. Warren Keifer
- Constituency: 8th district (1877-1879); 14th district (1879-1881)

Judge of the Ohio Circuit Court for the Third Circuit
- In office November 17, 1896 – February 8, 1897
- Preceded by: John K. Rohn
- Succeeded by: Caleb H. Norris

Mayor of Bucyrus, Ohio
- In office April 13, 1863 – April 10, 1865
- Preceded by: William M. Scroggs
- Succeeded by: Chapman D. Ward

Personal details
- Born: July 31, 1833 Orrville, Ohio, US
- Died: August 21, 1916 (aged 83) Bucyrus, Ohio, US
- Resting place: Oakwood Cemetery, Bucyrus, Ohio
- Party: Democratic
- Spouse: Charlotte E. Codding (m. 1858)
- Relations: Stephen Ross Harris (uncle)
- Children: 1
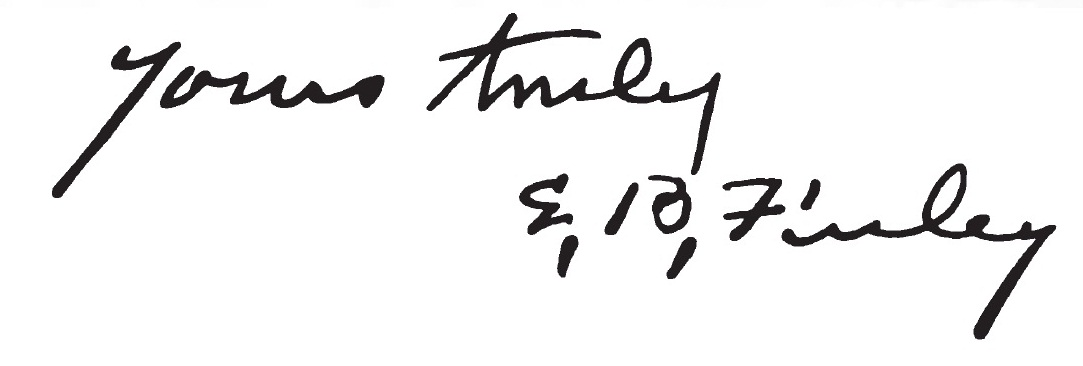
- Signature

Military service
- Allegiance: United States (Union); Ohio
- Service: Union Army; Ohio National Guard
- Years of service: 1861–1862 (Union Army); 1884–1886 (National Guard)
- Rank: First Lieutenant (Union Army); Major General (National Guard)
- Unit: 64th Ohio Infantry Regiment (Union Army); Ohio Adjutant General's Department (National Guard)
- Commands: Ohio National Guard
- Wars: American Civil War

Ebenezer Byron Finley (July 31, 1833 – August 21, 1916) was an American attorney and politician from Ohio. A Democrat, he was most notable for his service as a U.S. Representative from 1877 to 1881.

A native of Orrville, Ohio, Finley was educated in Orrville and worked at a variety of occupations prior to the American Civil War. In 1859, he commenced the study of law in the Bucyrus, Ohio office of his uncle, Stephen Ross Harris. He was admitted to the bar in 1861, but soon afterwards enlisted for the Civil War as a member of the Union Army's 64th Ohio Infantry Regiment. Appointed a first lieutenant in the regiment's Company K, Finley served for a year and took part in several battles before being discharged after he was injured in an accident. He settled in Bucyrus, where he established a successful law practice.

Finley was active in politics as a Democrat and served as mayor of Bucyrus from 1863 to 1865. He won election to the U.S. House in 1876 and served two terms, 1877 to 1881. During his second term he was chairman of the House's Committee on Public Expenditures. He declined to run for another term in 1880, and resumed practicing law in Bucyrus. From 1884 to 1886, he served as adjutant general of the Ohio National Guard with the rank of major general.

Finley died in Bucyrus on August 21, 1916. He was buried at Oakwood Cemetery in Bucyrus.

== Early life ==
Finley was born in Orrville, Ohio, the son of William Finley and Rhoda (Harris) Finley. Finley was raised and educated in Orrville, and worked at a variety of occupations, including teaching school in Illinois, boatman on the Illinois and Mississippi Rivers, and crew member on Great Lakes cargo ships. In February 1858, he married Charlotte E. Codding (1841–1929). They were the parents of a son, Harry M. Finley (1859–1882). In 1859, he began to study law in the Bucyrus, Ohio office of Stephen Ross Harris, who was his uncle. He was admitted to the bar in 1861, and began to practice in Bucyrus.

Soon after he began practicing law, Finley joined the Union Army for the American Civil War. He was active in recruiting Company K, 64th Ohio Infantry Regiment, in which he served as a first lieutenant (Note: Early sources indicate that Finley had been chosen to serve as the company's commander with the rank of captain. All subsequent sources indicate he was the company's first lieutenant.) He took part in several engagements, including the April 1862 Battle of Shiloh. Finley was injured in an accident, so he returned to Ohio to recuperate. He was mustered out of his company in July 1862, resigned in August, and was discharged in September.

After the war, Finley was active in veterans' organizations, including the Grand Army of the Republic and Society of the Army of the Cumberland and continued to practice law in Bucyrus. Among the prospective attorneys who studied under Finley was Edward Vollrath. He served as mayor of the village of Bucyrus from 1863 to 1865.

== Later life ==
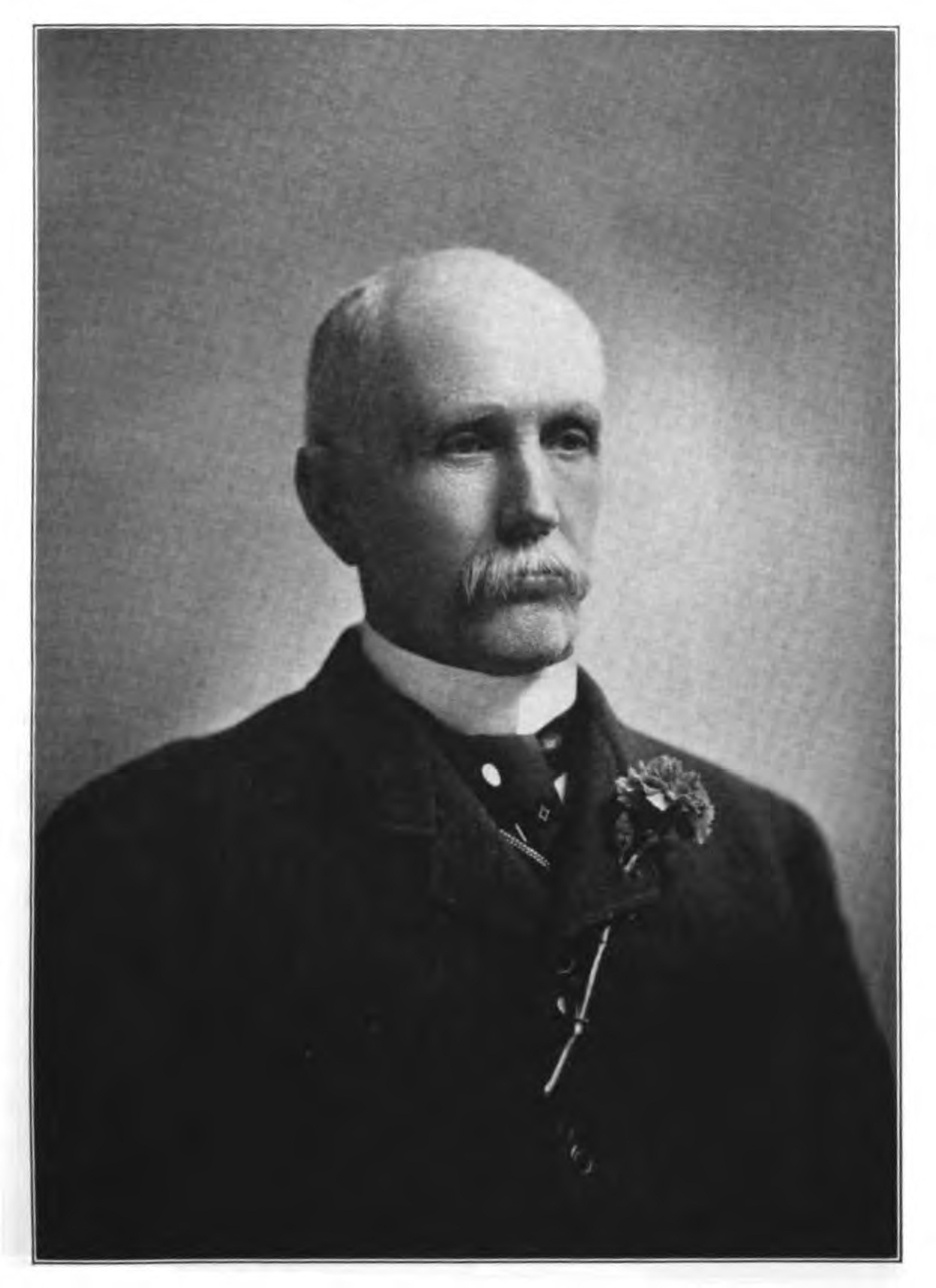
Finley in 1915

A Democrat, in 1876 Finley was elected to the United States House of Representatives. He was reelected in 1878, and served in the 45th and 46th Congresses (March 4, 1877 – March 3, 1881). In his second term, Finley was chairman of the House Committee on Public Expenditures. He was not a candidate for re-nomination in 1880 and resumed practicing law in Bucyrus.

In January 1884, Finley was appointed Adjutant General of Ohio. He was commissioned as a major general and served until 1886. In 1886, he was selected to serve as permanent chairman of the state Democratic convention.

Finley won a November 1896 election to fill a vacant seat as circuit court judge for Ohio's Third Circuit, and he served until February 1897. He was an at-large delegate to the 1896 Democratic National Convention.

Finley died in Bucyrus on August 21, 1916. He was buried at Oakwood Cemetery in Bucyrus.

== Sources ==
- United States Congress. "Ebenezer B. Finley (id: F000132)". Biographical Directory of the United States Congress.

U.S. House of Representatives
Preceded by Jacob P. Cowan	Member of the U.S. House of Representatives from Ohio's 14th congressional district 1877-1879	Succeeded by Gibson Atherton
Preceded by J. Warren Keifer	Member of the U.S. House of Representatives from Ohio's 8th congressional district 1879-1881	Succeeded by J. Warren Keifer
