= Gregory L. Wayt =

United States Army general

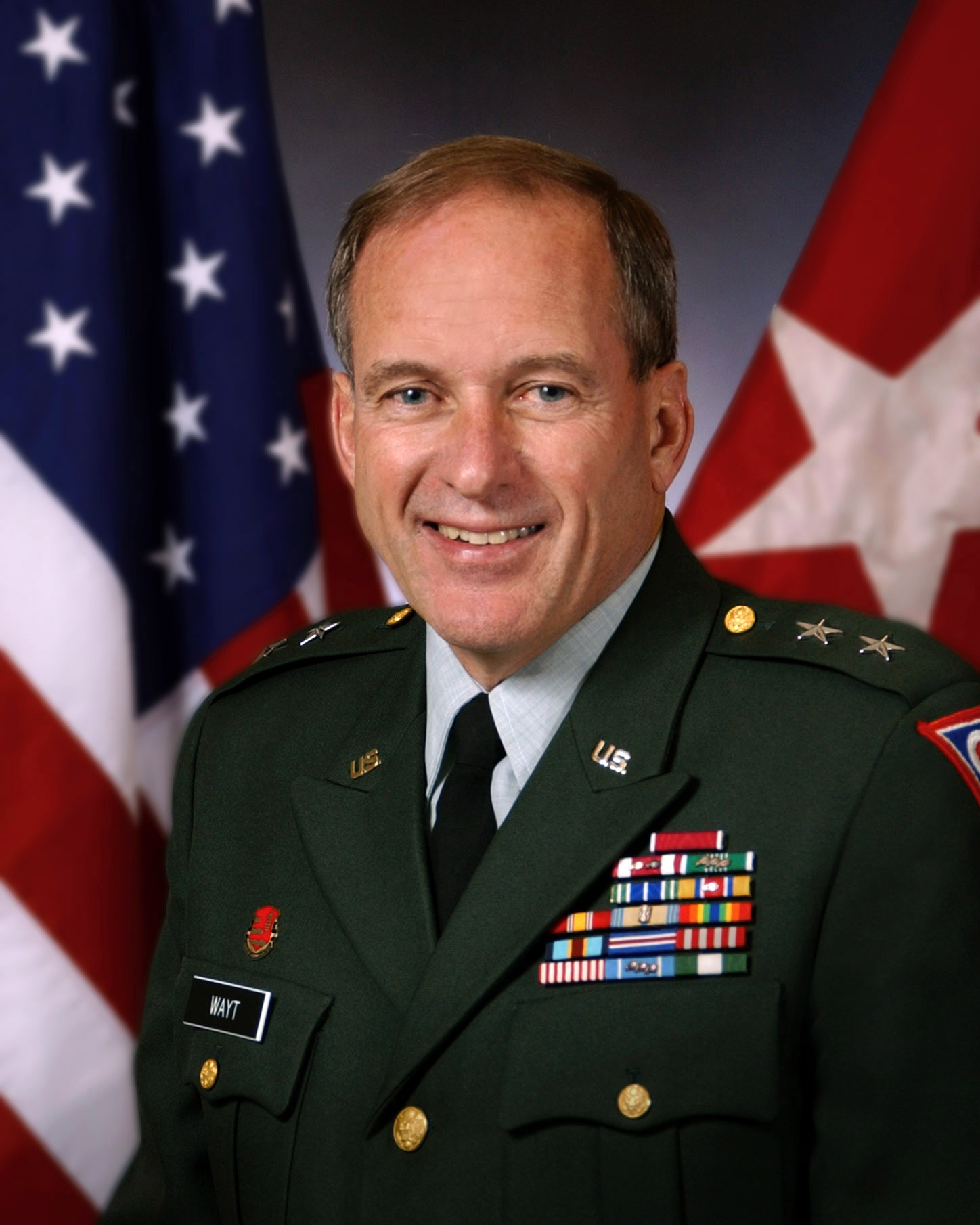
- Born: March 16, 1953 (age 73); Dayton, Ohio
- Military career
- Allegiance: United States of America
- Branch: United States Army
- Service years: 1975–2010
- Rank: Major General
- Unit: Joint Force Headquarters — Ohio

Major General Gregory Lynn Wayt (born March 16, 1953) served as Adjutant General of Ohio under Governors Bob Taft and Ted Strickland.

Wayt retired from the military on December 31, 2010, after 35 years of service. He directed the largest global and domestic operations in over 60 years and successfully accomplished all federal, international, and homeland defense and domestic missions while establishing benchmark programs recognized by the Department of Defense. In addition, he led the transformation of the Ohio National Guard from a Cold War strategic reserve to an operational force trained and equipped to meet joint and expeditionary global operations. He led deployment operations in the wake of Hurricane Katrina and Hurricane Rita, southern border security operations, Operations Iraqi Freedom, Operation Enduring Freedom and Operation Noble Eagle, in addition to numerous natural disasters in Ohio.

He was responsible for the establishment of the State Partnership Program with Serbia in 2006 and strengthening the existing partnership with Hungary. During his tenure over 100 exchanges occurred with Serbian representatives to include Humanitarian Assistance operations in Serbia and joint deployments with the Hungarian Defence Forces to Afghanistan. His vision developed one of the leading Family Readiness Programs in the nation

Wayt served as the president and vice president – Army of the Adjutants General Association of the United States and a Secretary of the Army appointment as a member of the Army Reserve Forces Policy Committee.

== Military career ==
Wayt's career began in 1975. He was a Distinguished Military Graduate from The Ohio State University Reserve Officer Training Corps program and received a Regular Army commission in 1975 as an Air Defense Artillery Officer. After completion of the Air Defense Basic Course at Fort Bliss, Texas, Wayt served on active duty with the 1st Infantry Division and the 32nd Army Air Defense Command until he returned to Ohio, where he joined the Ohio Army National Guard in January 1980. He has commanded and has held staff officer assignments at all levels from battery, battalion, group, regiment, brigade and Joint Force Headquarters. His assignments included Commander, 145th Regiment (Regional Training Institute), Deputy Chief of Staff, Plans, Operations, Training, and Military Support, and Joint Chief of Staff, Joint Force Headquarters — Ohio and Commanding General 73rd Troop Command (Brigade).

Wayt assumed the duties as the adjutant general, Joint Force Headquarters — Ohio on 1 July 2004. He was a member of the governor's cabinet and responsible for the command of the Ohio National Guard and the military readiness of the Ohio Militia. The Ohio National Guard consists of the Ohio Army National Guard, Ohio Air National Guard, Ohio Military Reserve, and Ohio Naval Militia, totaling more than 17,000 personnel. Wayt supervised four flag officer heads of these components and four Senior Level Civilians in the day-to-day operation and management of the readiness, fiscal, personnel, equipment, and real property resources of the agency.

Wayt orchestrated the 2005 Base Realignment and Closure Ohio strategy resulting in two impacted Ohio Air National Guard bases to remain open with new and relevant missions plus maintaining over 1,600 military positions in Ohio. The Mansfield Air National Guard Base was scheduled for closure and the Springfield Air National Guard Base to lose their assigned training mission of F16 pilots as well as aircraft with no follow on mission. His coordination within the Department of Defense, Department of the Air Force, Ohio Congressional Delegation, and Governor’s Office resulted in an expansion of each base with the new C27 aircraft assigned to the Mansfield Air National Guard Base and MQ-1 Predator and Intelligence support to the National Air and Intelligence Center at the Springfield Air National Guard Base. Additionally, he acquired over $300M of new construction of facilities as a result of the 2005 Base Realignment and Closure actions plus other additional federal appropriations. His vision and leadership provided the largest influx of military construction appropriations in its history and vastly improved the overall infrastructure.

Wayt was instrumental in working closely with the Department of Defense, National Guard Bureau and the Northern Command to develop the Homeland Response Force (HRF) concept resulting in recognition of this requirement in the Quadrennial Defense Review and the ultimate fielding of a HRF per FEMA region. He also worked closely with NORTHCOM on the Dual Status Commander (DSC) concept to allow one commander to simultaneously command both Title 10 and 32 forces for Domestic Operations.

Wayt developed, led, and coordinated multiple strategic plans for the Adjutants General Department, Ohio Air and Army National Guard and introduced the Baldrige Criteria for Performance Excellence, resulting in improved performance of day-to-day business operations resulting in multiple top national Baldrige performance awards from Department of Army, National Guard Bureau, and Gold Level Ohio Performance for Excellence Awards. He led Flag Officers and senior level leaders in formulating a new vision and strategic direction that successfully repositioned the organization for future national and international operations, strategic and efficient restructuring and improved financial performance by the use of Baldrige Criteria for Performance Excellence, Six Sigma tenants, and the Balanced Score Card. As a result, Wayt received a Secretary of Commerce appointment to the board of overseers, Malcolm Baldrige National Quality Award, and as a board member, Ohio Partnership for Excellence.

== Education ==
Raised in Columbus, Ohio, Wayt received a Bachelor of Science degree in education from the Ohio State University in November 1975 and a Master of Arts degree in public administration from the University of Dayton in 1986. He graduated from the Army Command and General Staff College in 1987, and from the Army War College in 1997.

== Personal life ==
Wayt is married to Deborah, and had one daughter, Lindsey.

== Awards ==
- Distinguished Service Medal (U.S. Army)
- Legion of Merit with Bronze Oak Leaf Cluster
- Meritorious Service Medal with One Silver Oak Leaf Cluster and One Bronze Oak Leaf Cluster
- Army Commendation Medal with Three Bronze Oak Leaf Clusters
- Army Achievement Medal
- Army Reserve Component Achievement Medal with Silver Oak Leaf Cluster
- National Defense Service Medal
- Global War on Terrorism Service Medal
- Humanitarian Service Medal
- Armed Forces Reserve Medal with Silver Hourglass Device
- Army Service Ribbon
- Overseas Service Ribbon
- Army Reserve Component Overseas Training Ribbon
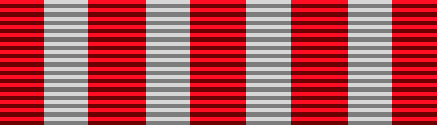
- Ohio Distinguished Service Medal
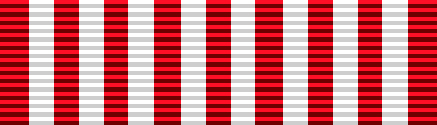
- Ohio Commendation Medal
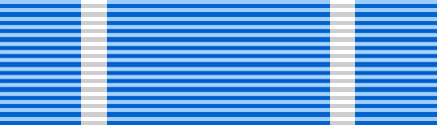
- Ohio Faithful Service Ribbon
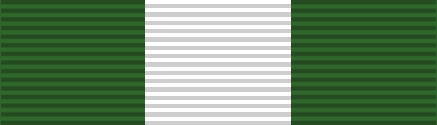
- Ohio Special Service Ribbon

Army Staff Identification Badge

== Assignments ==
1. Dec 75 – Jan 76, executive officer, Student Battery, USAADSCH, Fort Bliss, Texas
2. Jun 76 – Oct 77, platoon leader, 2nd Battalion 67th Air Defense Artillery, 1st Infantry Division, Germersheim, Germany
3. Oct 77 – Apr 78, section leader, 2nd Battalion 67th Air Defense Artillery, 1st Infantry Division, Germersheim, Germany
4. Apr 78 – Nov 79, S-1, 2nd Battalion 67th Air Defense Artillery, 1st Infantry Division, Mannheim, Germany
5. Dec 79 – May 85, container equipment control officer, 112th Transportation Battalion, Ohio Army National Guard, Middletown, Ohio
6. May 85 – May 87, S-1 officer, 112th Transportation Battalion, Ohio Army National Guard, Middletown, Ohio
7. May 87 – May 89, supply field service operations officer, 371st Corps Support Group, Ohio Army National Guard, Kettering, Ohio
8. May 89 – May 92, S-1, 371st Corps Support Group Ohio Army National Guard, Kettering, Ohio
9. May 92 – Sep 92, S-1, 73rd Troop Command (Brigade), Ohio Army National Guard, Columbus, Ohio
10. Oct 92 – Sep 93, S-3, 73rd Troop Command (Brigade). Ohio Army National Guard, Columbus, Ohio
11. Oct 93 – Aug 94, executive officer, 73d Troop Command (Brigade). Ohio Army National Guard, Columbus, Ohio
12. Aug 94 – Aug 96, deputy chief of staff for plans, operations, training, and military support, Headquarters State Area Command. Ohio Army National Guard, Columbus, Ohio
13. Aug 96 – May 98, commander, 145th Regiment (Regional Training Institute). Ohio Army National Guard, Columbus, Ohio
14. May 98 – Oct 03, chief of staff, Joint Force Headquarters — Ohio. Ohio Army National Guard, Columbus, Ohio
15. Oct 03 – Jun 04, commanding general, 73rd Troop Command (Brigade). Ohio Army National Guard, Columbus, Ohio
16. Jul 04 – Dec 10, adjutant general, Joint Force Headquarters — Ohio. Ohio National Guard, Columbus, Ohio

| before=John H. Smith | title=Adjutant General of Ohio |years=July 1, 2004 – December 31, 2010 |
