= 137th Aviation Regiment =

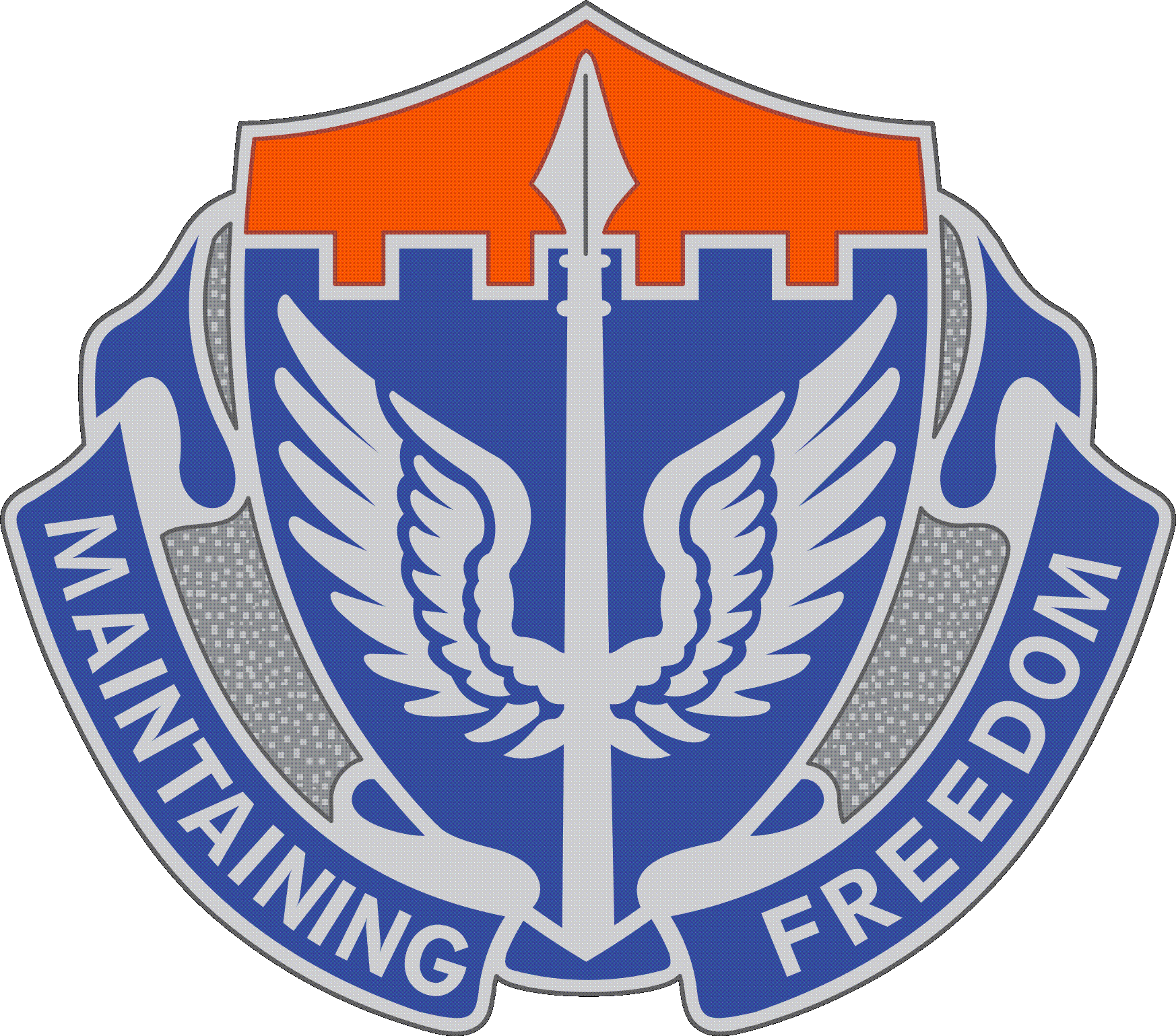
- Distinctive Unit Insignia
- Active: 1987
- Country: USA
- Branch: Aviation
- Type: Aviation
- Motto: Maintaining Freedom

Aircraft flown
- Cargo helicopter: CH-47F Chinook
- Utility helicopter: UH-60M Black Hawk

The 137th Aviation Regiment is a U.S. Army Aviation Branch regiment of the United States Army. It is drawn from the United States Army National Guard.

== History ==
It was constituted 1 October 1987 in the Ohio National Guard as the 137th Aviation, a parent regiment under the United States Army Regimental System. On that date it was organized from existing units (mainly from the 1416th Transportation Company later redesignated as Company D (-)(Columbus, OH) and Det 1, Co D 137th Aviation (Greensburg, OH)), with headquarters at Worthington, consisting of Company D only. The headquarters location was changed on 11 May 1988 to Columbus, Ohio.

On 5 March 1990 the regiment was reorganized, to consist of the 1st Battalion and Company D.

Reorganized 1991-1992 in the Arkansas, Montana, Ohio, North Dakota, South Dakota and West Virginia Army National Guard to consist of the 1st and 2d Battalions and Company D

Reorganized 1 September 1995 in the Arkansas, Indiana, Maine, Ohio, North Dakota, South Dakota and West Virginia Army National Guard to consist of the 1st and 2d Battalions, and Company D

Reorganized 1 September 1996 in the Ohio, Indiana, and Maine Army National Guard to consist of the 1st Battalion, an element of the 38th Infantry Division, and Company D

Reorganized 1 November 2002 in the Ohio, New York, and West Virginia Army National Guard to consist of the 1st Battalion, an element of the 38th Infantry Division, and Company G

Ordered into active federal service 5 July 2004 at Columbus, Ohio

Redesignated 1 October 2005 as the 137th Aviation Regiment

Released from active federal service 1 November 2005 and reverted to state control

Reorganized 1 June 2006 in the Ohio, Indiana, and New York Army National Guard to consist of the 1st Battalion, an element of the 38th Infantry Division, and Company G.

Reorganized 1 September 2006 in the Ohio and Indiana National Guard to consist of the 1st Battalion, an element of the 38th Infantry Division

Ordered into active federal service 2 January 2009 at home stations; released from active federal service 5 February 2010 and reverted to state control.

Elements have also served with the 18th Aviation Brigade.

== Structure ==
- 1st Battalion
  - Company C (HH-60) (IN ARNG)
  - Company D at Army Aviation Support Facility #2 Rickenbacker Air National Guard Base (UH-60 Maintenance) (OH ARNG)
  - Company G at Akron–Canton Airport (CH-47 Maintenance) (OH ARNG)
