= Ohio Adjutant General's Department =

Commander of the Ohio National Guard

Ohio Adjutant General
- Seal of the State of Ohio
- Incumbent; Brigadier General Matthew S. Woodruff since May 30, 2025
- Ohio National Guard
- Reports to: Secretary of Public Safety
- Nominator: Governor of Ohio with advice and consent from the Ohio Senate
- Appointer: Governor of the State of Ohio
- Term length: indefinite
- Formation: 1803; 223 years ago
- Deputy: Deputy Adjutant General
- Website: www.nationalguard.com

Ohio Adjutant General's Department is in the executive branch of government in the State of Ohio concerned with the military forces of the State of Ohio in the United States of America.

The Adjutant General has responsibility for the Ohio Army National Guard, the Ohio Air National Guard, the Ohio Naval Militia and the Ohio Military Reserve.

== List of Adjutants General ==
Term	Name	Party
1803	Cornelius R. Sedan	Republican
1803–1806	Samuel Finley	Republican
1806–1807	David Ziegler	Federalist
1807–1809	Thomas Worthington	Federalist
1809–1810	Joseph Kerr	Republican
1810–1811	Isaac Van Horne	Republican
1811–1812	Thomas Worthington	Federalist
1812–1818	Isaac Van Horne	Republican
1818–1828	William Doherty	Republican
1828–1837	Samuel C. Andrews	Federalist
1837–1839	William Doherty	Whig
1839–1841	Joseph Medary, Jr.	Democrat
1841–1845	Edward H. Cummings	Whig
1845–1851	Thomas W.H. Mosely	Whig
1851–1857	J.W. Wilson	Democrat
1857–1861	Henry B. Carrington	Republican
1861–1862	Catharinus P. Buckingham	Republican
1862–1864	Charles W. Hill	Republican
1864–1868	Benjamin R. Cowen	Republican
1868–1869	E.P. Schneider	Republican
1869–1874	William Knapp	Republican
1874–1876	John T. Amos	Democrat
1876–1877	Allen T. Wikoff	Republican
1877–1878	Charles W. Carr	Republican
1878–1880	Luther W. Meiley	Democrat
1880–1881	William H. Gibson	Republican
1881–1884	Samuel B. Smith	Republican
1884–1886	Ebenezer B. Finley	Democrat
1886–1890	Henry A. Axline	Republican
1890–1891	Morton L. Hawkins	Democrat
1891–1892	Thomas T. Dill	Democrat
1892–1893	Edgar J. Pocock	Republican
1893–1896	James C. Howe	Republican
1896–1898	Henry A. Axline	Republican
1898	Herbert B. Kingsley	Republican
1899–1900	Henry A. Axline	Republican
1900–1904	George R. Gyger	Republican
1904–1905	Ammon B. Critchfield	Republican
1906	Oliver H. Hughes	Democrat
1906–1908	Ammon B. Critchfield	Republican
...
1941–1942	Whittier S. Bird	
1942–1949	Donald F. Pancoast	
1949–1952	Leo M. Kreber	
1952-1954	Albert E. Henderson	
1959-1959	Leo M. Kreber	
1959-1963	Loren G. Windom	
1963-1968	Erwin C. Hostetler	
1968-1971	Sylvester T. Del Corso	
1971-1975	Dana L. Stewart	
1975-1983	James C. Clem	
1983-1988	Raymond R. Galloway	
1988–1999	Richard Alexander	
1999–2004	John H. Smith	–
2004–2011	Gregory L. Wayt	–
2011–2014	Deborah A. Ashenhurst	–
2015–2019	Mark E. Bartman	–
2019–2025	John C. Harris, Jr.	–
2025–Present	Matthew S. Woodruff	–

== Notes ==
- Sandles, A P; Doty, E W, eds. (1898). The biographical annals of Ohio 1906-1907-1908 : A handbook of the Government and Institutions of the State of Ohio. State of Ohio. p. 590.
  (this document disagrees with the above chart, period 1810 - 1819. It does not show Worthington's second stint.)
- Reid, Whitelaw (1895). Ohio in the War Her Statesmen Generals and Soldiers. Vol. 1. Cincinnati: The Robert Clarke Company. p. 600.
  (This source say that before the civil war "Ormsby M. Mitchel was for two years Adjutant-General of the State of Ohio")
