= James W. Forsyth =

American general (1834–1906)

James William Forsyth
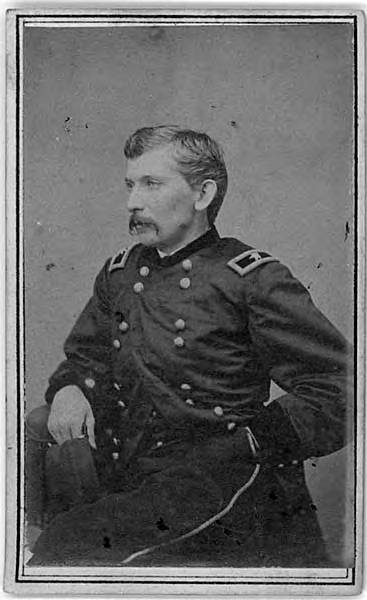
- Forsyth in 1867
- Born: August 8, 1834; Maumee, Ohio, U.S.
- Died: October 24, 1906 (aged 72); Columbus, Ohio, U.S.
- Burial place: Green Lawn Cemetery, Columbus, Ohio, U.S.
- Military career
- Allegiance: United States (Union)
- Branch: United States Army (Union Army)
- Service years: 1856–1897
- Rank: Major General
- Commands: 7th U.S. Cavalry; Department of California
- Conflicts: American Civil War; Western Theater; Battle of Shiloh; Peninsula campaign; Battle of Antietam; Battle of Fredericksburg; Battle of Chickamauga; Overland Campaign; Valley campaigns of 1864; Battle of Cedar Creek; Appomattox campaign; Battle of Five Forks; Franco-Prussian War (observing); Bannock War; Ghost Dance War; Battle of Wounded Knee; Drexel Mission Fight

James William Forsyth (August 8, 1834 – October 24, 1906) was a U.S. Army officer and general. He was primarily a Union staff officer during the American Civil War and cavalry regimental commander during the American Indian Wars. Forsyth is best known for having commanded the 7th Cavalry at the Wounded Knee Massacre on December 29, 1890, during which more than 250 men, women, and children of the Lakota were killed and more than 50 were wounded.

== Early life ==
Forsyth was born in Maumee, Ohio, where he attended the local schools. He attended West Point from 1851 to 1856 and received a commission as second lieutenant in Co. D, 9th U.S. Infantry. He was instrumental in the completion of the frontier fort at San Juan Island and served as the company's acting commander when Captain George E. Pickett was away on leave. After serving in Washington Territory at Fort Bellingham and Camp Pickett, San Juan Island, Forsyth was promoted to first lieutenant in 1861 and returned to the East to command Union forces in the Civil War.

== Career ==
=== American Civil War ===
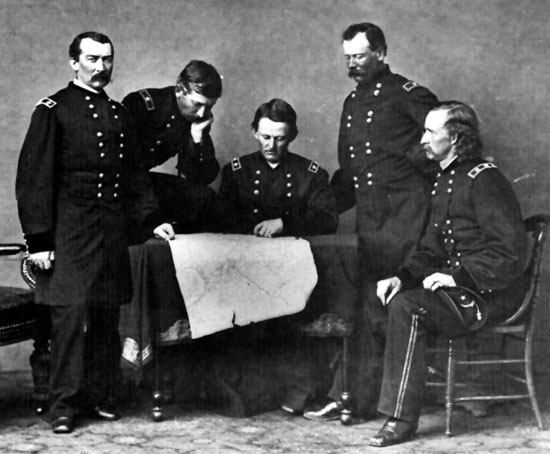
From left: Sheridan, Forsyth, Merritt, Devin and Custer

Forsyth joined the Union Army as Colonel of the 64th Ohio Infantry on November 9, 1861. He was temporarily in command of a brigade during Don Carlos Buell's march to the relief of Maj. Gen. U.S. Grant at Shiloh. However, the day before the battle began the brigade's regular commander, James A. Garfield, returned and Forsyth did not participate in the actual battle. Forsyth relinquished command of the 64th Ohio to Colonel John Ferguson on 1 January 1862.

In 1862, he transferred to the Army of the Potomac where he served as the assistant U.S. inspector general during the Peninsula campaign. During the Maryland Campaign, he was assigned as aide-de-camp to Major General Joseph K. F. Mansfield until the latter's untimely death at the Battle of Antietam. Forsyth then became provost marshal to the Army of the Potomac at the Battle of Fredericksburg.

In 1863, Forsyth transferred back to the Western Theater to serve as adjutant to General Philip H. Sheridan at Chickamauga. Forsyth was brevetted to Major in the Regular Army for his service at Chickamauga. When Sheridan transferred to the Army of the Potomac's Cavalry Corps, Forsyth followed as his chief of staff. He participated in this capacity during the Overland Campaign. He was subsequently chief of staff of the Army of the Shenandoah during the Shenandoah Valley Campaign of 1864 and chief of staff to the Union Cavalries during the Appomattox Campaign. He received brevets to Lieutenant Colonel, USA for Cedar Creek, colonel, USA for Five Forks and Brigadier General, U.S. Volunteers, for the Shenandoah Valley Campaign.

On January 13, 1866, President Andrew Johnson promoted Forsyth to Brigadier General of Volunteers to rank from May 19, 1865. The U.S. Senate confirmed the appointment on February 23, 1866, notwithstanding that Forsyth was mustered out of the volunteer service on January 15, 1866. On July 17, 1866, President Johnson nominated Forsyth for appointment as a brevet Brigadier General in the regular army to rank from April 9, 1865. The Senate confirmed the appointment on July 23, 1866.

Forsyth served under Sheridan along with Wesley Merritt, Thomas Devin, and George A. Custer. Later, all of these men would become famous Indian fighters.

After the war, Forsyth was elected as a veteran companion of the first class of the Illinois Commandery of the Military Order of the Loyal Legion of the United States.

=== Promotions during the Civil War ===
- 1st Lieutenant, 9th Infantry (Regular Army) 15 March 1861
- Transferred to 18th Infantry 14 May 1861
- Captain, 18th Infantry (Regular Army) 24 October 1861
- Brevet Major 20 September 1863 (Chickamauga, Georgia)
- Major (Volunteers) 7 April 1864 (Assistant Adjutant General)
- Lieutenant Colonel (Volunteers) 19 April 1864 (Assistant Inspector General)
- Brevet Lieutenant Colonel 19 October 1864 (Cedar Creek, Virginia)
- Brevet Brigadier General of Volunteers 9 May 1865 (for actions in the Valley Campaign)
- Brevet Colonel 1 April 1865 (Five Forks, Virginia)
- Brevet Brigadier General 9 April 1865 (for action at Five Forks)

=== American Indian Wars ===
Forsyth remained in the Regular Army after the end of the American Civil War. He commanded a brigade of cavalry for two years and was a strong supporter of African Americans and buffalo soldiers. He then joined Sheridan again in 1867, and moved with him when he became commander of the Department of the Missouri in 1866. Forsyth served first as the department's secretary and then as inspector, with an appointment in the cavalry. He took part in military campaigns against the Comanche, Cheyenne, Arapaho, and Kiowa Indians in 1868–69. Forsyth went to Europe in 1870 as an official observer of the Franco-Prussian War.

In 1878, Forsyth commanded the 1st U.S. Cavalry in the Bannock War, having considerable success in this role. In 1885, Forsyth was in command of Fort Maginnis, Montana, where the army was monitoring the Crow, Cree, and the Gros Ventres (Atsina) Indians.

On July 11, 1886, after a leave of absence of two months, Forsyth was promoted to Colonel of the 7th U.S. Cavalry, assumed command of the regiment July 26, 1886, at Fort Meade, South Dakota and marched to Fort Riley, Kansas, where he arrived September 8, 1887, where he remained in command until Nov. 10th, 1890, during which time he organized and developed the system of instruction for light artillery and cavalry for the School of Application for Infantry and Cavalry. Forsyth was in command of the 7th Cavalry at the Wounded Knee Massacre on December 29, 1890, and at the Drexel Mission Fight that took place on the Pine Ridge Indian Reservation on December 30, 1890.

On November 9, 1894, Brigadier General Alexander McDowell McCook was promoted to major general to hold the position vacated by the retirement of Major General Oliver O. Howard. Colonel Forsyth was promoted to the rank of brigadier general to succeed McCook and was appointed commander of the Department of California.

On May 11, 1897, Forsyth was promoted to major general to succeed Major General Frank Wheaton, who had retired on May 8. Forsyth retired from the U.S. Army three days later.

Forsyth married the daughter of Ohio Governor William Dennison. The couple had four children. He died on October 24, 1906, in Columbus, Ohio, and is buried in Green Lawn Cemetery.

==== Promotions after the Civil War ====
(All in the Regular Army)

- Major, 10th Cavalry 28 July 1866
- Lieutenant Colonel, 1st Cavalry 4 April 1878
- Colonel, 7th Cavalry 11 June 1886
- Brigadier General 9 November 1894 (Dept of California)
- Major General 11 May 1897

== Controversy ==
Mass Grave for the Dead Lakota After the Engagement at Wounded Knee

There have been several attempts by various parties to rescind the Medals of Honor awarded in connection with the Battle of Wounded Knee. Proponents claim that the engagement was in-fact a massacre and not a battle, due to the high number of killed and wounded Lakota women and children and the very one-sided casualty counts. Estimates of the Lakota losses indicate 150–300 killed, of which up to 200 were women and children. Additionally, as many as 51 were wounded. In contrast, the 7th Cavalry suffered 25 killed and 39 wounded, many being the result of friendly fire.

Calvin Spotted Elk, direct descendant of Chief Spotted Elk killed at Wounded Knee, launched a petition to rescind medals from the soldiers who participated in the battle.

The Army has also been criticized more generally for the seemingly disproportionate number of Medals of Honor awarded in connection with the battle. For comparison, 19 Medals were awarded at Wounded Knee, 21 at the Battle of Cedar Creek, and 20 at the Battle of Antietam. Respectively, Cedar Creek and Antietam involved 52,712 and 113,000 troops, suffering 8,674 and 22,717 casualties. Wounded Knee involved 610 combatants (490 of which being US Army) and resulted in as many as 705 casualties (including 31 killed and 33 wounded US Army soldiers).

== Memorials ==
- The Town of Forsyth, Montana (Rosebud County) is named in his honor.
- Camp Forsyth on Ft. Riley, Kansas is also named in his honor.

== See also ==
- List of American Civil War generals (Union)

== Archives ==
- James W. Forsyth Family Papers 1803–2004. 6.82 cubic feet. At the University of Washington Libraries Special Collections.
- Edmond S. Meany papers. 1877–1935. 71.86 cubic feet. At the University of Washington Libraries Special Collections.
- James W. Forsyth Papers. Yale Collection of Western Americana, Beinecke Rare Book and Manuscript Library.
