= 146th Infantry Regiment (United States) =

146th Infantry Regiment (8th Ohio)
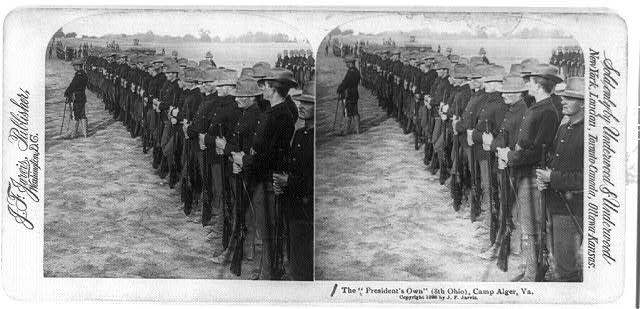
- Men of the 8th Ohio (later the 146th) Infantry in 1898
- Active: 1876–1899, 1899–1919
- Country: United States
- Allegiance: Ohio
- Branch: Army National Guard
- Type: Infantry
- Engagements: Spanish–American War: Siege of Santiago; World War I: Meuse-Argonne Offensive; Ypres-Lys

The 146th Infantry Regiment was an infantry regiment of the United States Army, Ohio National Guard. It was formed in 1917 from the old 8th Ohio Infantry Regiment and served in several American wars from 1898 to 1919.

== History ==
The 8th Infantry Regiment of the Ohio National Guard was organized at Massillon from new and existing units on 6 July 1876. It was consolidated with the 9th Infantry Regiment, which was organized on 21 February 1877 at Akron, on 13 August 1878; at the same time the regimental headquarters moved to Wooster. The 10th Infantry Regiment, organized on 6 July 1876 at Youngstown, was consolidated into the 8th on 27 June 1881.

=== Spanish–American War ===
On 25 April 1898, the United States declared war on Spain, beginning the Spanish–American War. The 8th Ohio Volunteer Infantry participated in the Siege of Santiago, which ended shortly after, on 17 July 1898.

=== 1900s ===
The regiment was disbanded on 14 April 1899 and its elements were reorganized as unattached companies for a brief period until it was reorganized in Bucyrus on 21 July. The regiment was briefly commanded by Charles W. F. Dick, who succeeded to command of a brigade and was succeeded by Edward Vollrath. Vollrath remained in command from 1899 to 1917. For service on the Mexico–United States border, it mustered into Federal service on 19 June 1916 at Camp Willis, and mustered out after its return on 22 March 1917 at Fort Benjamin Harrison, Indiana.

=== World War I ===
The National Defense Act of 1916 reorganized the US Military, and in time for World War I, the 8th Ohio was reorganized into the 146th Infantry Regiment, and was assigned to the 37th Infantry Division, the "Buckeye" division, at Camp Sheridan, Alabama in August 1917. The regiment trained together and expanded its size before arriving in France on 22 June 1918. The 146th was assigned to the 73rd Infantry Brigade alongside the 145th Infantry Regiment and trained under French Army tutelage in the Bourmont sector. On 4 August, the 146th went into the frontline in the Baccarat sector and continued to train under the French VI Corps. On 16 September, it was transported to Robert-Espagne where it remained for 4 days. The Ohioans were then sent to Récicourt, and then to Avocourt where they joined the V Corps' advance during the Meuse-Argonne Offensive. After continuous fighting, the regiment was relieved on 1 October 1918 when they had reached Cierges. After resting behind the lines, the 146th was sent to Hooglede, Belgium in the Lys sector, arriving on the frontline on 22 October. Attached to the French XXX Corps, the regiment advanced on the Scheldt River until they were relieved on 5 November, and enjoyed some rest at Tielt before moving back into the fray on 8 November. Attached to the French XXXIV Corps, the 146th advanced on, and forced a crossing of the Scheldt River on the night of 10–11 November. The Ohioans resumed the advance on the morning of 11 November, but were halted at 1100 due to the Armistice of 11 November 1918. When the 146th Infantry Regiment returned home to Ohio in 1919, it was formally deactivated.

The elements formerly part of the 8th Ohio were consolidated with those of the 5th Ohio in the Ohio National Guard to form the 3rd Ohio Infantry between 1919 and 1920, whose headquarters was federally recognized at Cleveland on 1 July 1920. A year later, per the Per the National Defense Act of 1920, the regiment became the 145th Infantry of the 37th Division.
