= Lynching of Richard Dickerson =

1904 lynching and riot targeting African Americans in the U.S. state of Ohio

Richard Dickerson lynching
- Date: March 7, 1904
- Location: Springfield, Ohio, U.S.; 39.924444°N 83.81°W
- Participants: Mob
- Deaths: 2
- Injuries: 1
- Property damage: 7 buildings including the jail
- Displaced: 150
- Coroner: Mr. Thomas
- Arrests: Albert Loback and George Hill
- Charges: Malicious destruction of property

The lynching of Richard Dickerson took place in Springfield, Ohio, on March 7, 1904. Dickerson was an African American man arrested for the fatal shooting of a white police officer, Charles B. Collis. A mob broke into the jail and seized and lynched Dickerson. Riots and attacks on black-owned businesses followed.

== Background ==
Between 1902 and 1904 eleven African Americans were lynched in Springfield, Ohio. Most of those charged in the crimes received light sentences.

Dickerson, also known as Richard Dollon, came to Springfield from Cynthiana, Kentucky. Some people who knew him spoke of his "bad reputation." On Sunday, 6 March 1904, he had an altercation with a woman whom he called his wife, and he asked police sergeant Charles B. Collis to help him retrieve something from her. Next, Dickerson was alleged to have shot his wife and then spun around and shot Collis. When word spread, there was talk of lynching Dickerson.

The next day, Monday, March 7, 1904, Collis died from his wounds, and the mob resolved to lynch Dickerson. Members of the Anti-Mob and Lynch-Law Association implored the sheriff to ask for help, but the sheriff said he could protect the prisoner.

== Lynching ==
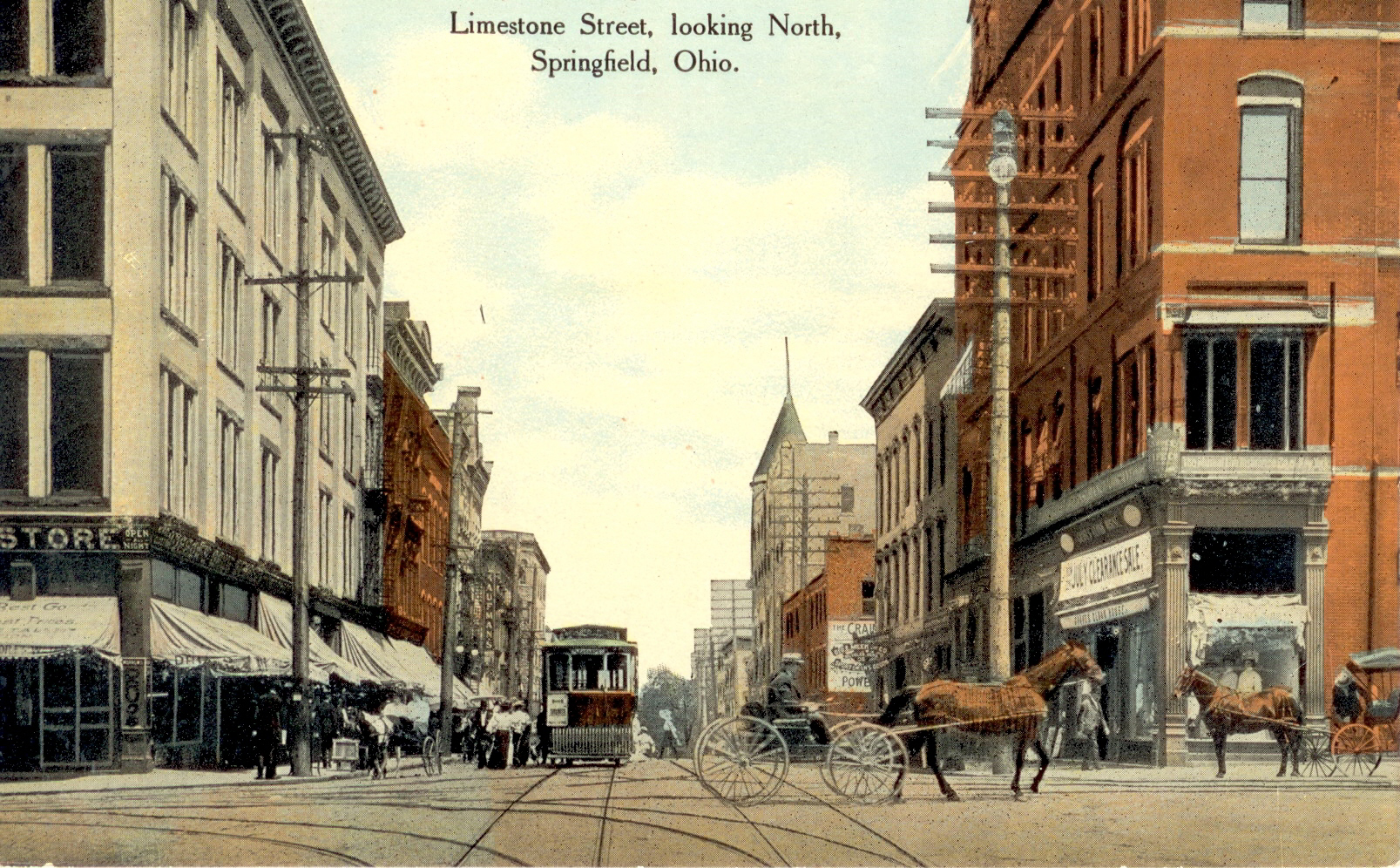
Downtown Springfield, Ohio c. 1900

At 9:00 pm on March 7, 1904, a mob came to the jail and demanded that Sheriff Routzahn turn over Dickerson. The Sheriff told the crowd to disperse and said he would defend Dickerson. He said he would "do his duty at whatever cost." A mob had been trying to knock down one of the jail's doors and they stopped after the Sheriff's statement. The Sheriff thought the trouble had passed, but an even larger mob returned and broke through the south door of the jail. The deputies and Sheriff Routzahn were overrun.

Once inside the jail, the men used sledgehammers and began beating down the iron jail partitions. Finally, the sheriff relented and turned Dickerson over to the mob. The attackers found Dickerson crouched in the corner of his cell. Two leaders of the mob were Albert Loback and George Hill.

The mob took Dickerson out of the jail to a paved lot outside. They formed a square around him, and someone knocked Dickerson down. Nine shots were fired into him while he lay on the ground. Then the men carried him to Fountain Avenue and tied a rope around his neck. Two men climbed a telegraph pole to position the rope. They hung him from the telegraph pole and then the mob spent another hour shooting at his dead body. It was said that they passed guns around to members of the mob so that they could take turns shooting at Dickerson's body. There were reportedly 26 revolvers in the mob. His body was shot multiple times.

Governor Myron T. Herrick dispatched ten companies of Ohio National Guard troops to restore order to the town.

== Riots ==
On March 8, 1904, a day after the lynching, a mob of more than 1,000 people gathered at the rail yards. An attack on the "Levee" was planned. The Levee was an African American section of town filled with saloons. The mob gathered up flammable items and separated into three groups. Each group was responsible for burning down a different saloon. Before the night was over, seven buildings were destroyed. The fire department showed up and stood by watching the buildings burn. During the rioting no effort was made by the Company A Ninth Battalion since it was composed of many African Americans.

City officials asked the governor for five more companies of soldiers to help restore order. The Governor complied bringing the total to 15 companies of soldiers. On March 9, African American residents were ordered to stay indoors. In one reported incident five shots were fired at one Black man in town. Colonel Mead was in charge of the troops, and he restored order.

== Aftermath ==
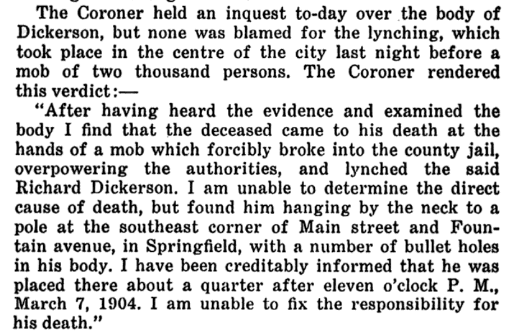
Coroner's report on the Richard Dickerson lynching - New York Herald 9 March 1904

The coroner gave his ruling after an autopsy. He stated, "I am unable to determine the direct cause of death..."

Albert Lobeck and George Hill were later arrested for leading the mob. They were each charged with malicious destruction of property.

By March 16, Anna Corbin (the woman who was shot by Dickerson) filed a $5000 lawsuit against the city for Dickerson's lynching.

In the summer of 1904, several Ohio National Guard officers faced court-martial for failing to act on their own initiative to mobilize their units in response to the rioting. Judge advocate Edward Vollrath, an attorney and regimental commander, prosecuted the case. However, the plaintiffs successfully argued that in the absence of activation orders from the governor, they were under no obligation to order their soldiers to act.

== See also ==
- List of lynching victims in the United States
