= 18th Aviation Brigade (United States) =

Inactive US Army unit

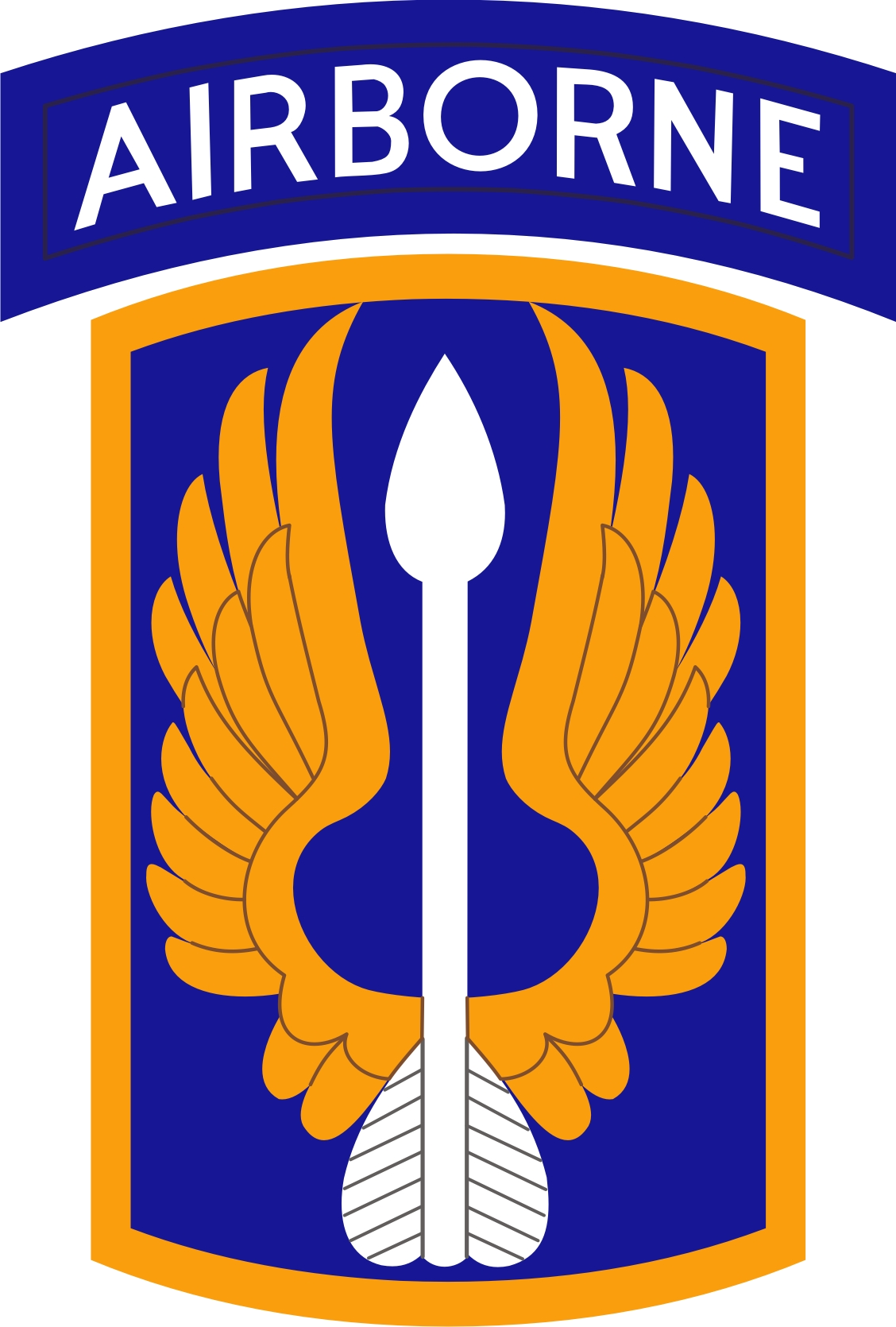
- 18th Aviation Brigade Shoulder Sleeve Insignia
- Active: 1987–2006
- Country: United States
- Branch: U.S. Army
- Part of: XVIII Airborne Corps
- Garrison/HQ: Simmons Army Airfield, Fort Bragg
- Nickname: Black Barons (Special Designation)
- Equipment: AH-64; UH-60; CH-47
- Engagements: Vietnam War; Operation Urgent Fury; Operation Just Cause; Operation Desert Storm; Operation Iraqi Freedom
- Decorations: Meritorious Unit Commendation; Vietnam Cross of Gallantry; Vietnam Civil Action Medal

Insignia
- Distinctive Unit Insignia

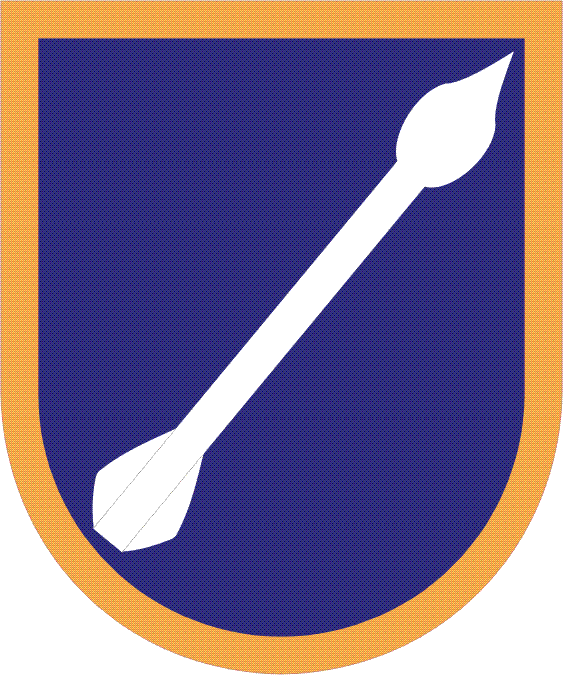
- Beret Flash

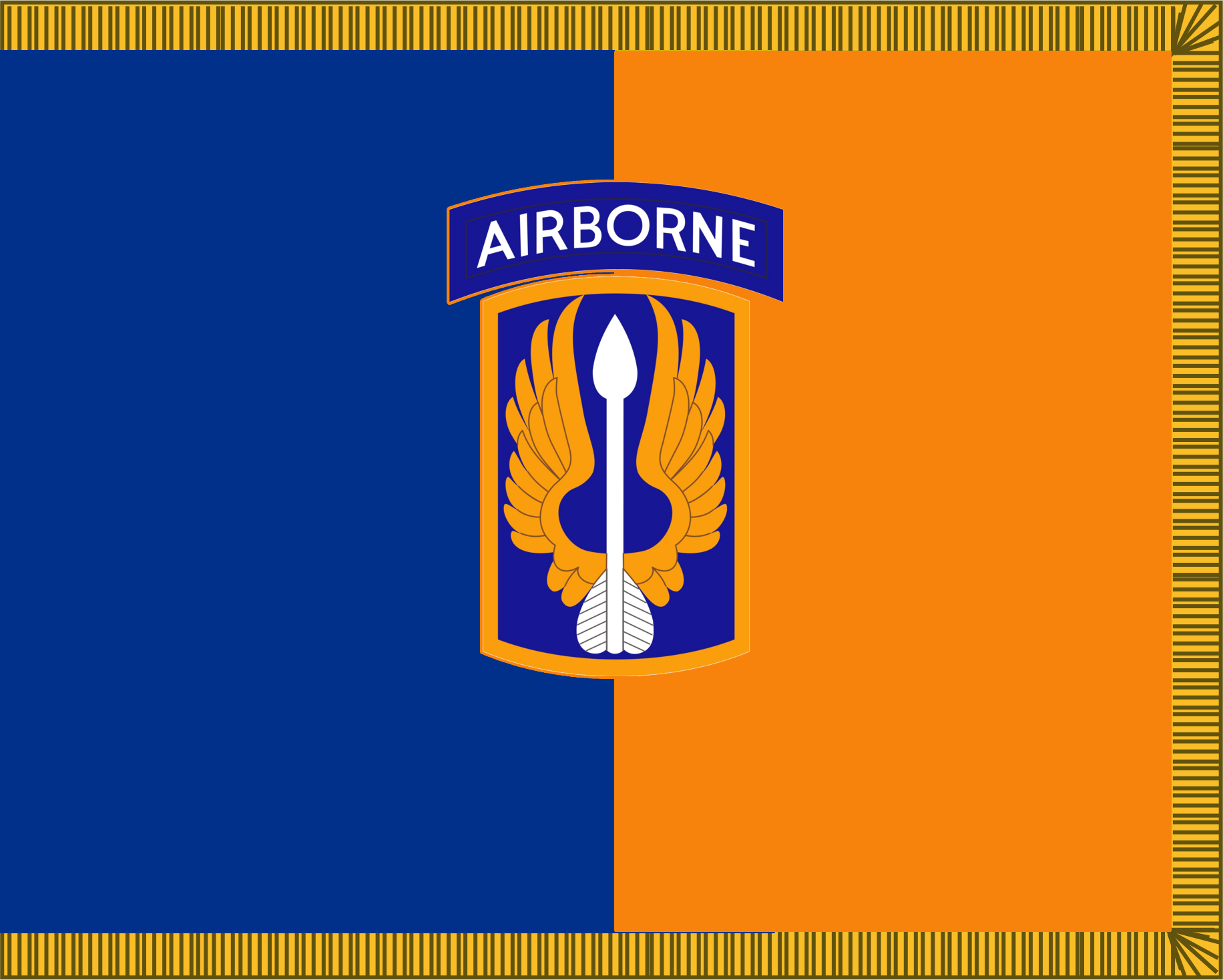
- 18th Aviation Brigade Flag

The 18th Aviation Brigade ("Black Barons") is an inactive aviation brigade of the United States Army. Its initial formation in 1987 drew upon the resources of the 269th Aviation Battalion, originally formed in 1966.

== History ==
The 269th Aviation Battalion served with the 12th Aviation Group in South Vietnam from 28 January 1967 to 15 April 1971, being located at Củ Chi Base Camp. It primarily supported the 25th Infantry Division.

=== Gulf War ===
On 17 August 1987, Headquarters and Headquarters Company, 18th Aviation Brigade, was activated. On 1 September 1987, the 269th Aviation Battalion was reorganized and redesignated as the 18th Aviation Brigade (Corps)(Airborne). The brigade has since participated in Operation Prime Chance in the Persian Gulf, Operation Just Cause in Panama, and "Desert Shield and Storm" in Southwest Asia, and Hurricane Andrew Relief in Southern Florida.

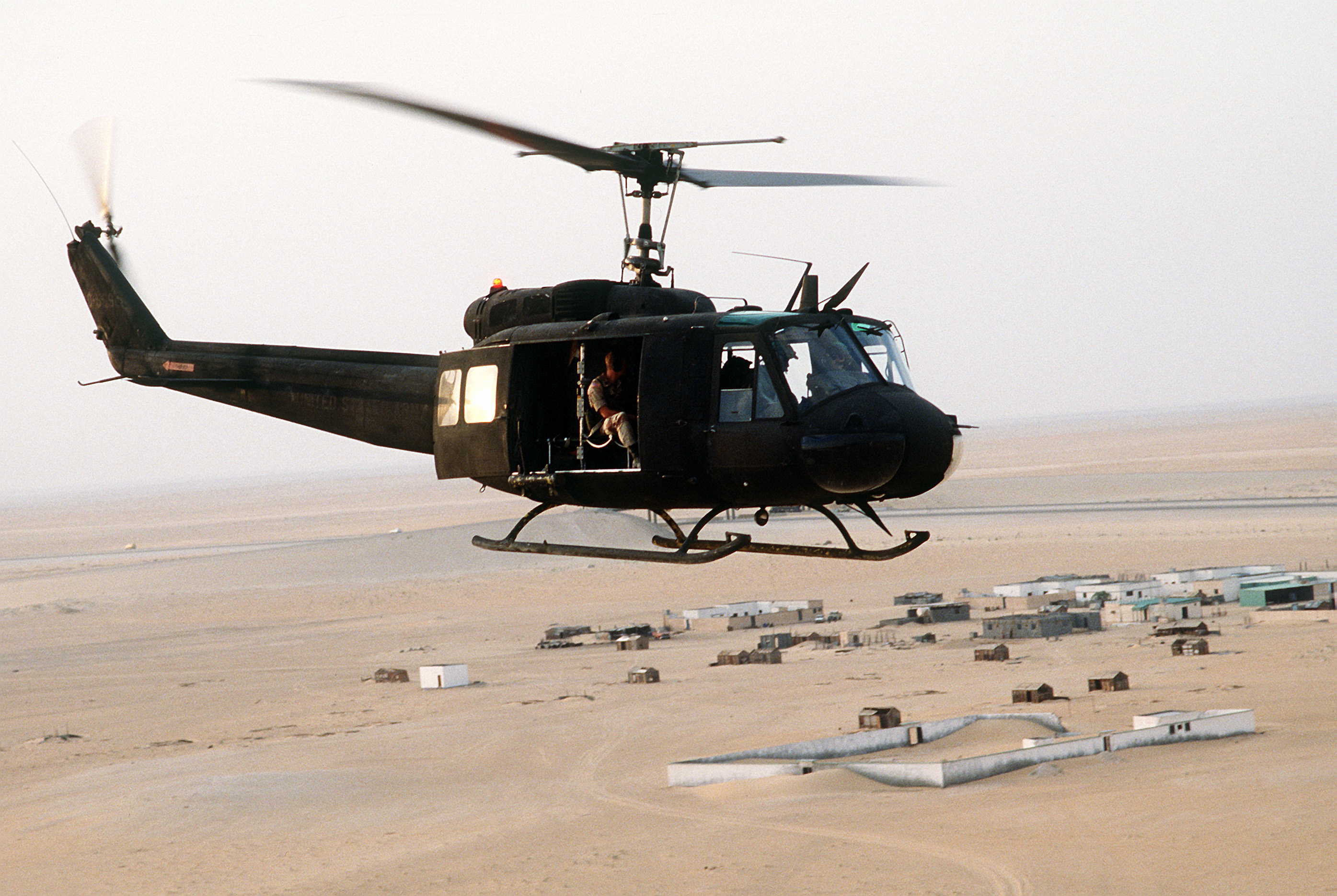
An 18th Aviation Brigade UH-1H during "Desert Shield", 1990

On the first day of the Gulf War 24 February 1991, the 101st Airborne Division (Air Assault) began its attack with its Boeing AH-64 Apaches, Bell AH-1 Cobras, 60 Sikorsky UH-60 Black Hawks and 40 Boeing CH-47 Chinooks augmented by the XVIII Airborne Corps' 18th Aviation Brigade and began lifting the 1st Brigade into what became Forward Operating Base Cobra (FOB), 93 miles (150 km) into Iraq and halfway to the Euphrates River. Over three hundred helicopter sorties ferried the troops and equipment into the objective area in the largest heliborne operation in military history. Four of the CH-47D Chinooks from A Co 2/159th were temporarily assigned to the 82nd airborne for the war but were released after the first day of the ground war and after objectives on MSR Texas were completed and their assistance's along with the rest of the Battalion was needed elsewhere in theatre supporting the 101st, 24ID and 82nd when called.

The other operation the brigade administered in the Gulf was the activities of Task Force 118, the former Operation Prime Chance force. TF 118, or 4th Squadron, 17th Cavalry Regiment, as it became on 15 January 1991, operated armed Bell OH-58D Kiowas off U.S. Navy warships.

=== 2000s ===
An undated listing on Globalsecurity.org, seemingly for the early 2000s, said the brigade's units included two active, and eight National Guard battalions. The active units were:

- 1st Battalion, 159th Aviation Regiment
- 2nd Battalion, 159th Aviation Regiment
- 1st Battalion, 58th Aviation Regiment

The National Guard units were:

- 449th Aviation Group (NC ARNG)
- 1st Battalion, 111th Aviation Regiment (FLNG)
- 1st Battalion, 126th Aviation Regiment (RI, NC, SC ARNG)
- 1st Battalion, 131st Aviation Regiment (AL ARNG)
- 1st Battalion, 137th Aviation Regiment (OH ARNG)
- 1st Battalion, 151st Aviation Regiment (SC ARNG)
- 5th Battalion, 155th Aviation Regiment (MDNG)
- 1st Battalion, 224th Aviation Regiment (LA ARNG).

The 18th Aviation Brigade was also deployed to Iraq from October 2004 to October 2005. This was the last time the brigade was deployed as a unit. The unit supplied aviation assets all across Iraq, ranging from combat missions to service and support missions. As part of an Army-wide restructuring, the brigade was deactivated shortly after its return from Iraq in March 2006. Although designated as an airborne unit, parachute qualification was not a prerequisite for assignment to the brigade and many, if not most, in the brigade were not jump-qualified.
