= 64th Ohio Infantry Regiment =

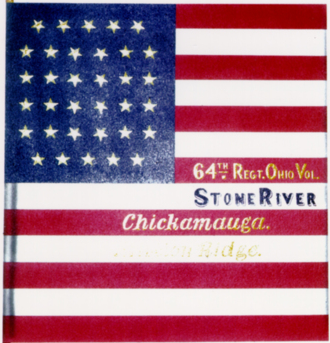
- Flag of the 64th Ohio Infantry Regiment
- Active: November 9, 1861 – December 3, 1865
- Country: United States of America
- Allegiance: Union
- Branch: Union Army
- Type: Regiment
- Role: Infantry
- Engagements: Battle of Shiloh; Siege of Corinth; Battle of Perryville; Battle of Stones River; Tullahoma Campaign; Battle of Chickamauga; Siege of Chattanooga; Battle of Missionary Ridge; Atlanta Campaign; Battle of Rocky Face Ridge; Battle of Resaca; Battle of Kennesaw Mountain; Siege of Atlanta; Battle of Jonesboro; Battle of Spring Hill; Second Battle of Franklin; Battle of Nashville

The 64th Ohio Infantry Regiment was an infantry regiment in the Union Army during the American Civil War.

== Service ==
The 64th Ohio Infantry Regiment was organized at Camp Buckingham in Mansfield, Ohio and mustered in for three years service on November 9, 1861, under the command of Colonel James William Forsyth. The regiment was recruited in Ashland, Clark, Crawford, Marion, Richland, Stark, Van Wert, and Wayne counties. A number of the field grade officers were Regular Army officers who would eventually win over their recruits with their courage and professionalism on campaign.

The regiment was attached to 20th Brigade, Army of the Ohio, to January 1862. 20th Brigade, 6th Division, Army of the Ohio, to September 1862. 20th Brigade, 6th Division, II Corps, Army of the Ohio, to November 1862. 3rd Brigade, 1st Division, Left Wing, XIV Corps, Army of the Cumberland, to January 1863. 3rd Brigade, 1st Division, XXI Corps, Army of the Cumberland, to October 1863. 3rd Brigade, 2nd Division, IV Corps, Army of the Cumberland, to June 1865. 2nd Brigade, 2nd Division, IV Corps, to August 1865. Department of Texas to November 1865.

John A. Gillis, a corporal from the 64th Ohio, gave his reasons for fighting for the Union in the war, stating in his diary that "We are now fighting to destroy the cause of these dangerous diseases, which is slavery and the slave power." There were others who joined up for the adventure with their friends which also led many to re-enlist when their hitch was up.

The 64th Ohio Infantry mustered out of U.S. service at Victoria, Texas, on December 3, 1865.

== Detailed service ==
1861: Moved to Louisville, Ky., December 14; thence to Bardstown, Ky., December 25. Duty at Danville and Ball's Gap, Ky., January and February 1862.

1862: March to Munfordville, thence to Nashville, Tenn., February 7-March 13, and to Savannah, Tenn., March 29-April 6.

1862: Battle of Shiloh, Tenn., April 6–7.

1862: Advance on and siege of Corinth, Miss., April 29-May 30.

1862: Pursuit to Booneville June 1–12. Duty along Memphis & Charleston Railroad until August.

1862: March to Louisville, Ky., in pursuit of Bragg, August 21-September 26. Pursuit of Bragg into Kentucky October 1–15. Bardstown, Ky., October 3. Battle of Perryville October 8 (reserve).

1862: March to Nashville, Tenn., October 16-November 7, and duty there until December 26. Advance on Murfreesboro December 26–30. Nolensville December 27. Battle of Stones River December 30–31, 1862 and January 1–3, 1863.

1863: Duty at Murfreesboro until June. Reconnaissance to Nolensville and Versailles January 13–15. Tullahoma Campaign June 23-July 7. Occupation of middle Tennessee until August 16.

1863: Passage of the Cumberland Mountains and Tennessee River, and Chickamauga Campaign August 16-September 22. Reconnaissance toward Chattanooga September 7. Lookout Valley September 7–8. Occupation of Chattanooga September 9. Lee and Gordon's Mills September 11–13. Near Lafayette September 14. Battle of Chickamauga September 19–20. Siege of Chattanooga, September 24-November 23. Chattanooga-Ringgold Campaign November 23–27. Orchard Knob November 23–24. Missionary Ridge November 25. Pursuit to Graysville September 26–27. March to relief of Knoxville, November 28-December 8. Operations in eastern Tennessee until April 1864.

1864: Atlanta Campaign May 1-September 8. Demonstrations on Rocky Faced Ridge and Dalton May 8–13. Buzzard's Roost Gap or Mill Springs May 8–9. Battle of Resaca May 14–15. Near Calhoun May 16. Adairsville May 17. Near Kingston May 18–19. Near Cassville May 19. Advance on Dallas May 22–25. Operations on line of Pumpkin Vine Creek and battles about Dallas, New Hope Church and Allatoona Hills May 25-June 5. Operations about Marietta and against Kennesaw Mountain June 10-July 2. Pine Hill June 11–14. Lost Mountain June 15–17. Assault on Kennesaw June 27. Ruff's Station or Smyrna Camp Ground July 4. Chattahoochie River July 5–17. Buckhead, Nancy's Creek, July 18. Peachtree Creek July 19–20. Siege of Atlanta July 22-August 25. Flank movement on Jonesboro August 25–30. Battle of Jonesboro August 31-September 1. Lovejoy's Station September 2–6. Operations in northern Georgia and northern Alabama against Hood September 29-November 3. Nashville Campaign November–December. Near Edenton November 21. Columbia, Duck River, November 24–27. Spring Hill November 29. Battle of Franklin November 30. Battle of Nashville December 15–16. Pursuit of Hood to the Tennessee River December 17–28. Moved to Huntsville, Ala., and duty there until March 1865.

1865: Operations in eastern Tennessee March 15-April 22. At Nashville, Tenn., until June. Moved to New Orleans, La., June 16, thence to Texas, and duty there until December.

== Casualties ==
The regiment lost a total of 274 men during service; 6 officers and 108 enlisted men killed or mortally wounded, 1 officer and 159 enlisted men died of disease.

== Commanders ==
- Colonel John Sherman - resigned at the request of Abraham Lincoln to resume duties as U.S. Senator
- Colonel James William Forsyth - resigned
- Colonel John Ferguson - promoted January 1, 1862
- Colonel Alexander McIlvaine - commanded at the battle of Stones River as lieutenant colonel; promoted March 11, 1863, and killed in action May 9, 1864, at Rocky Face Ridge
- Lieutenant Colonel Robert Carson Brown - commanded at the battle of Nashville

== See also ==
- List of Ohio Civil War units
- Battle of Shiloh
- Battle of Perryville
- Battle of Stones River
- Battle of Chickamauga
- Siege of Chattanooga
- Battle of Missionary Ridge
- Atlanta Campaign
- Siege of Atlanta
- Battle of Spring Hill
- Second Battle of Franklin
- Battle of Nashville
