= Courts of Ohio =

Courts of Ohio include:

State courts of Ohio

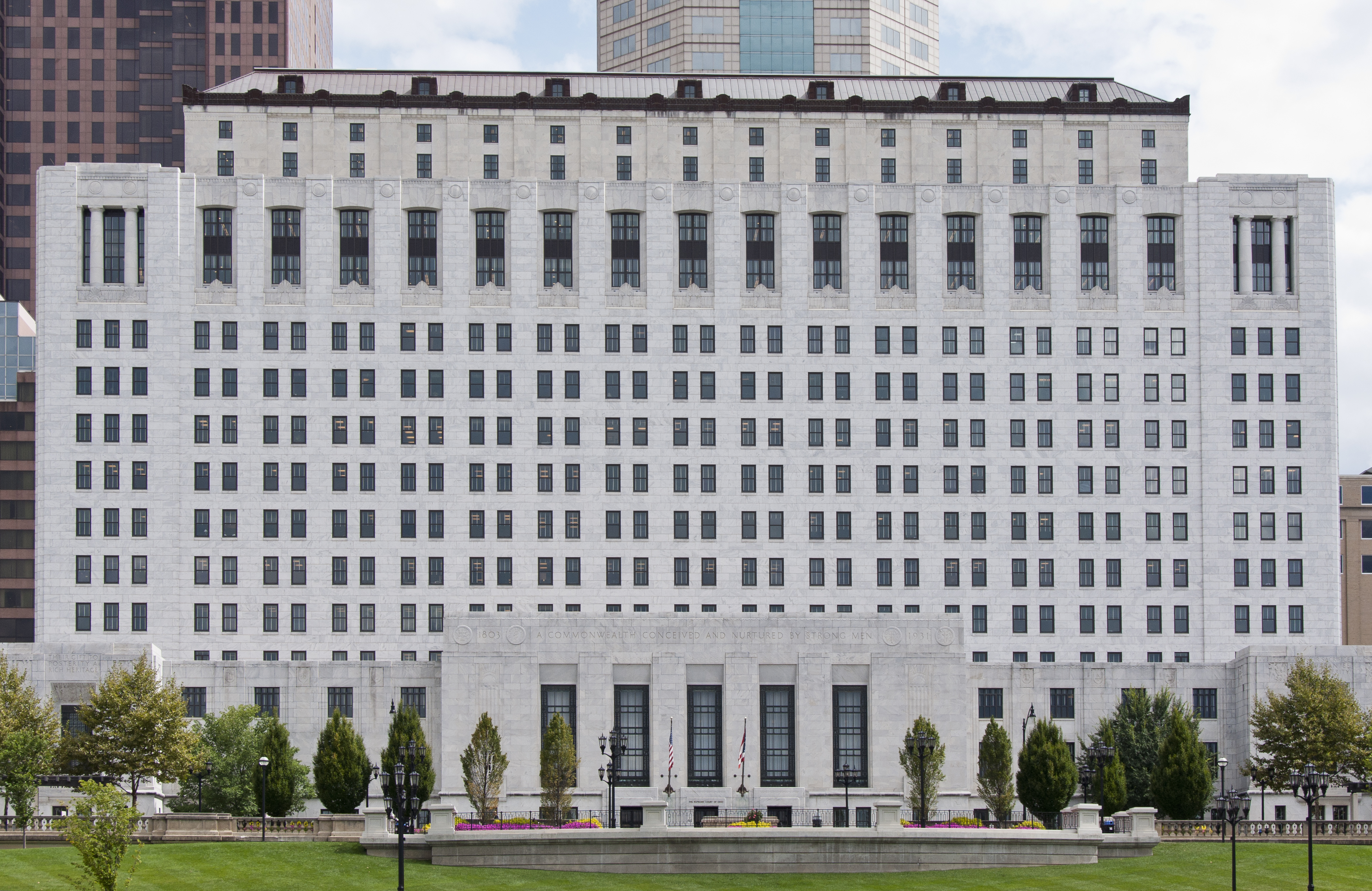
The Thomas J. Moyer Ohio Judicial Center in Columbus, headquarters of the Supreme Court of Ohio

- Supreme Court of Ohio
  - Ohio District Courts of Appeal (12 districts)
    - Ohio Court of Claims
    - Ohio Courts of Common Pleas
      - Ohio Municipal Courts
      - Ohio County Courts
        - Ohio Mayor's Courts

Federal courts located in this state

- United States Court of Appeals for the Sixth Circuit (headquartered in Cincinnati, having jurisdiction over the United States District Courts of Kentucky, Michigan, Ohio, and Tennessee)
- United States District Court for the Northern District of Ohio
- United States District Court for the Southern District of Ohio

Former federal courts of Ohio

- United States District Court for the District of Ohio (extinct, subdivided)

== See also ==
Judiciary of Ohio
