= Ohio Army National Guard =

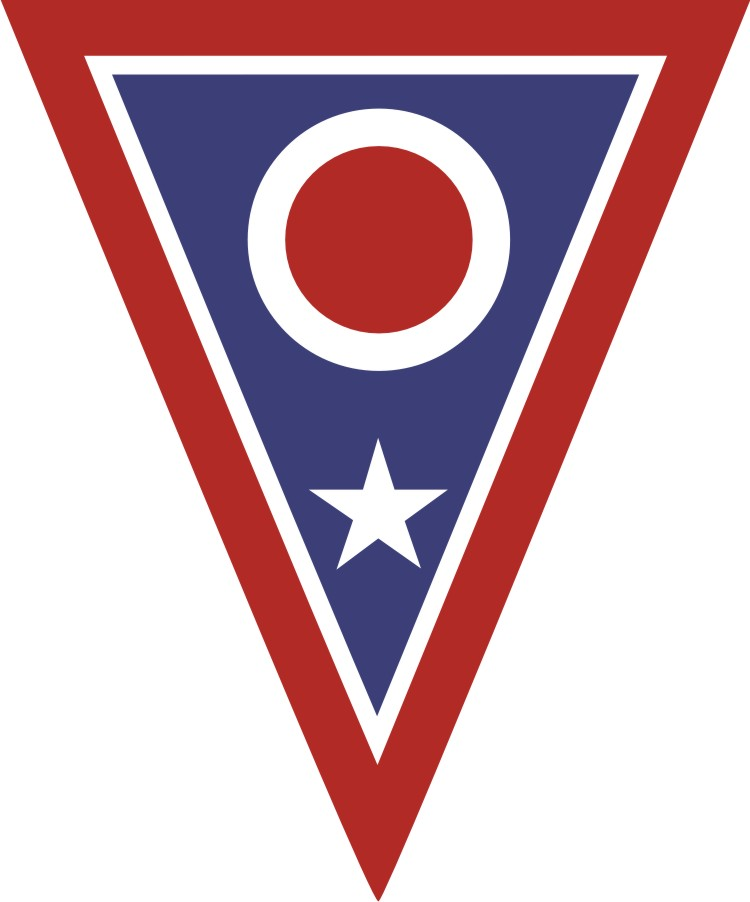
- Ohio Army National Guard SSI
- Active: July 25, 1788 (as the Northwest Territory Militia)
- Country: United States
- Allegiance: Ohio
- Branch: United States Army
- Type: ARNG Headquarters Command
- Role: United States Army National Guard
- Part of: Ohio National Guard
- Mottos: "Always Ready, Always There!"

Commanders
- Civilian leadership: President Donald Trump (Commander-in-Chief); Daniel P. Driscoll (Secretary of the Army); Governor Mike DeWine (Governor of the State of Ohio)
- State military leadership: MG John C. Harris Jr.

Insignia
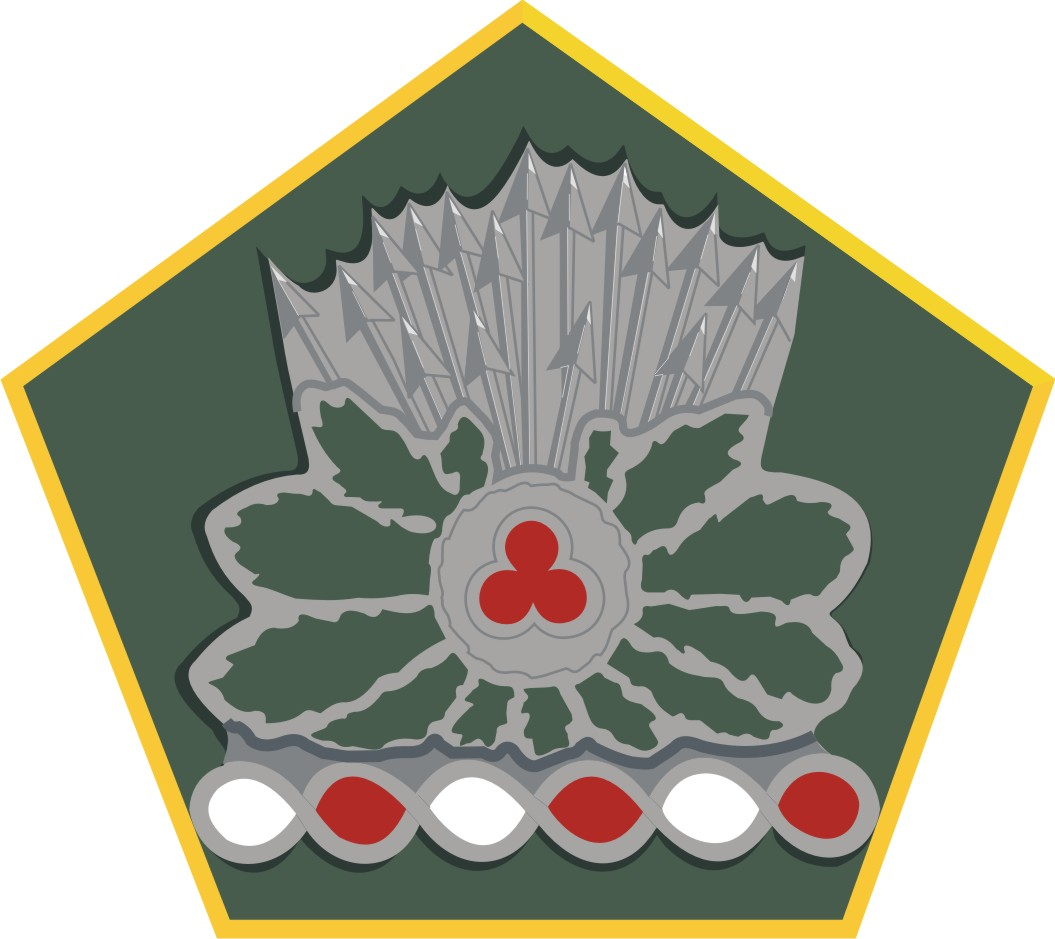
- Ohio Army National Guard Headquarters DUI

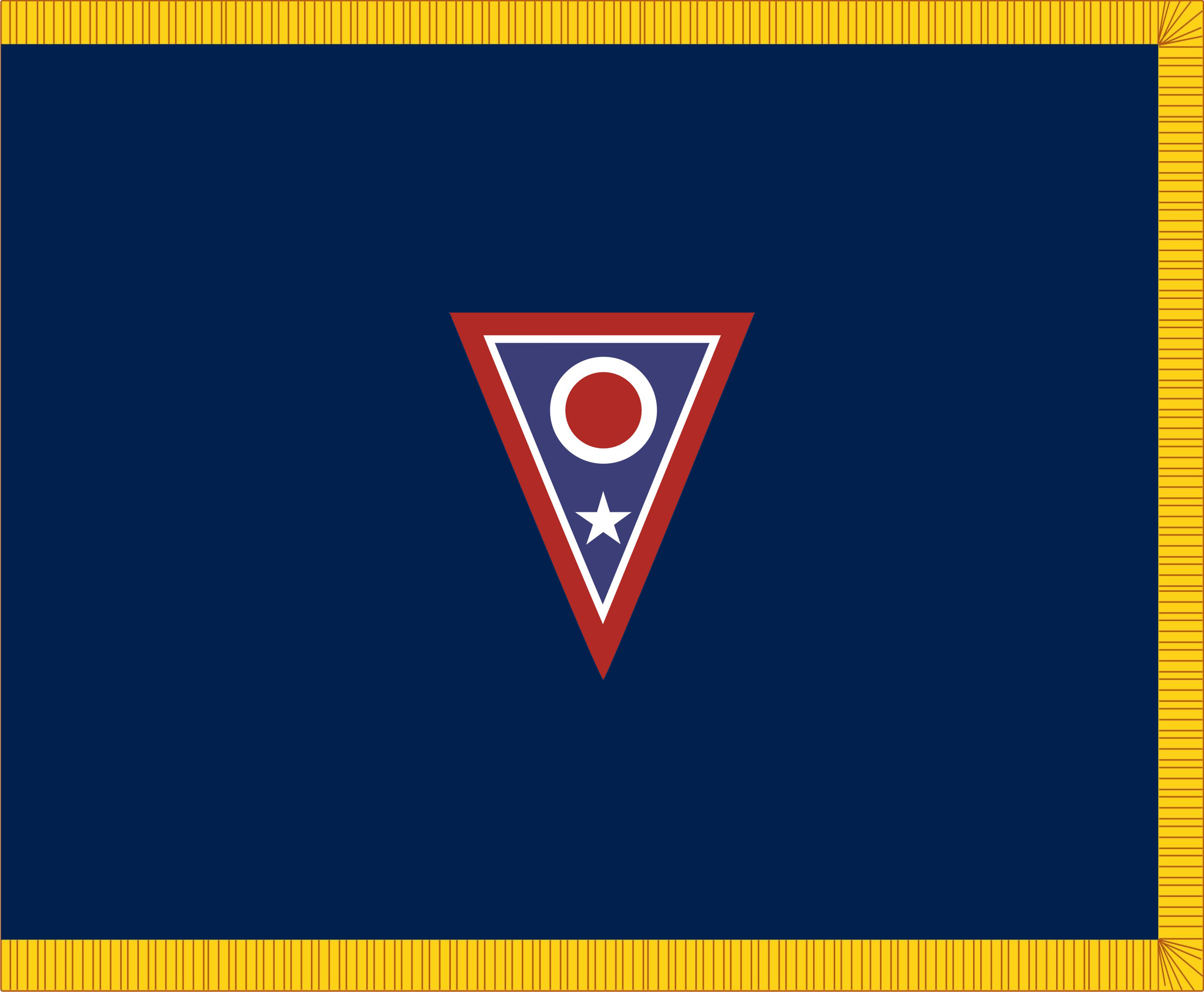
- Ohio Army National Guard Headquarters Flag

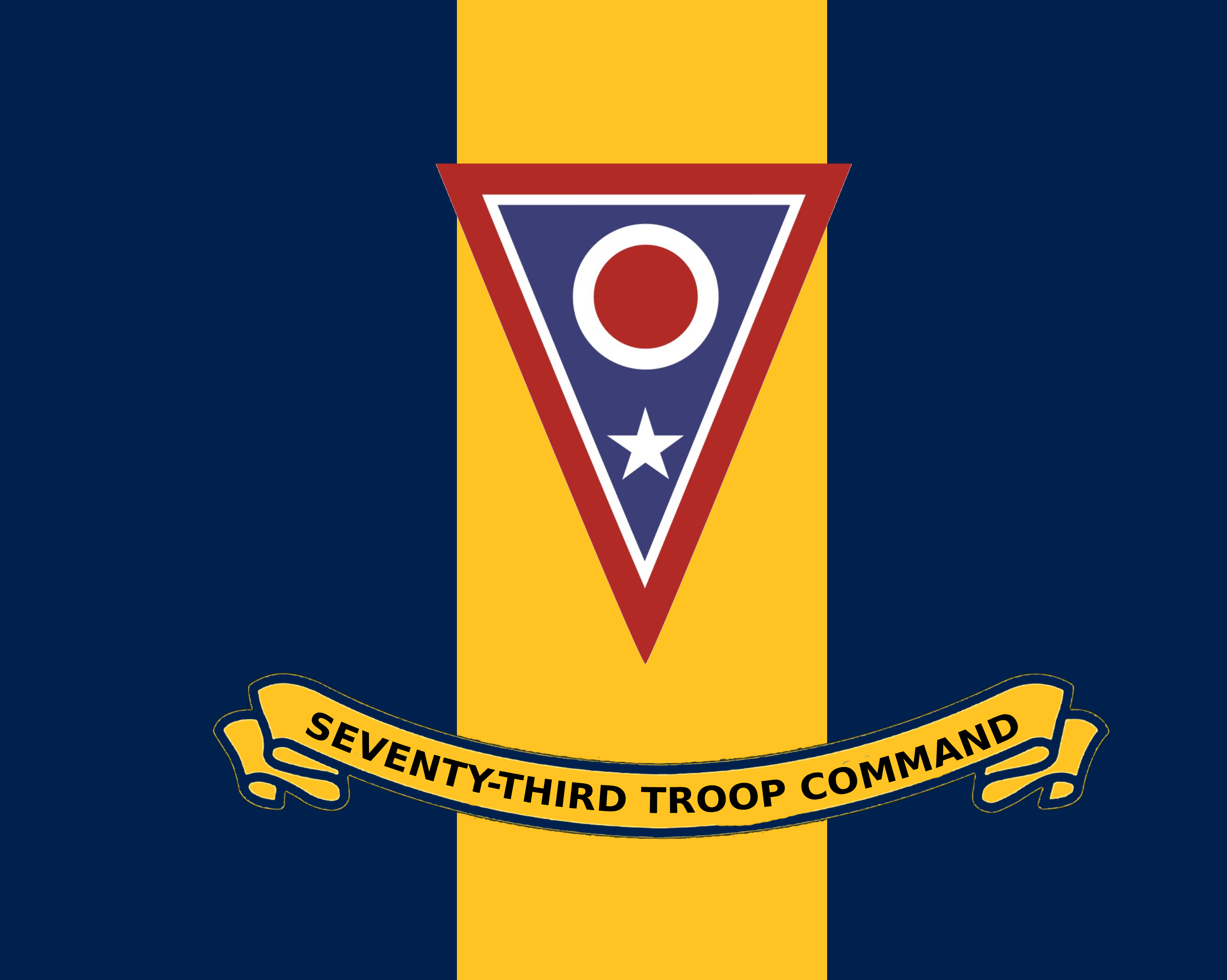
- Ohio Army National Guard 73rd Troop Command Flag

- Ohio Army National Guard Crest

The Ohio Army National Guard is a part of the Ohio National Guard and the Army National Guard of the United States Army. It is also a component of the organized militia of the state of Ohio, which also includes the Ohio Naval Militia, the Ohio Military Reserve and the Ohio Air National Guard. The Ohio Army National Guard consists of a variety of combat, combat support, and combat service support units. As of September 2010, its end strength exceeded 11,400 soldiers. Its headquarters is the Beightler Armory in Columbus, Ohio. Many units conduct Annual Training at Camp Grayling, Michigan.

On May 4, 1970, Guard units opened fire onto a crowd of both Vietnam War protestors and simple bystanders on the campus of Kent State University. Four people were killed and nine others injured, an event known as the Kent State shootings. The President's Commission on Campus Unrest concluded that the Guard's actions were "unnecessary, unwarranted, and inexcusable."

== History ==
=== Founding militia ===
The Ohio National Guard can be traced back to the initial settlement at Marietta, Ohio, in July 1788. Rooted in the English and early colonial tradition of citizen-soldiers providing local protection and law enforcement. These American Revolutionary War veterans and their families quickly organized into local militia units. The federal government passed the Militia Act of 1792, which required all able bodied men ages 18 to 45 to serve in their local militia units, and provide their own weapons and equipment. It further authorized the governor of each state to appoint an Adjutant General to enact the orders of the governor, and to supervise unit training and organization. Reflecting the Founding Fathers' distrust of a large standing army, it strictly limited the ability of the militia to serve outside of their state borders. And, it placed effective control with the governor rather than the federal government.

The occupation of the Ohio Territory by the United States was contested by the region's native inhabitants. A confederation of Indian tribes with British backing engaged in a campaign of raids and depredations upon the scattered settlements, resulting in full-scale war by the 1790s. The disastrous campaigns led by Generals Josiah Harmar and Arthur St. Clair only intensified Indian resistance to white migration, and threatened the existence of white Ohio settlements. The decisive victory of General "Mad" Anthony Wayne at the Battle of Fallen Timbers (1794), outside of present-day Toledo and the subsequent Treaty of Greenville (1795). And so removed the combined British-Indian military threat to Ohio settlers for the time being. While only limited numbers of Ohio militia played a part in these campaigns, the local militia units formed an important bulwark defending their local communities against potential attack.

=== War of 1812 ===
After achieving statehood in 1803 Ohio continued the law creating a body of "state troops" and each significant village or county providing its own local unit. The military readiness of these local militia units varied greatly as did their uniform and armament. The monthly militia muster was supposed to train the members in close order drill and marksmanship, but in many cases was more of a social and political event. Moreover, each unit was responsible for electing its own officers with the victors often being the most popular or the one best able to furnish a ready supply of sour mash.

With the advent of war with Great Britain in 1812, there was renewed interest in beefing up the size and effectiveness of the militia. Ohio governor Josiah Meigs formed three regiments of Ohio militia in response to the proposed invasion to drive the British, and their Indian allies, from Canada (With a view towards annexing it to the United States). The first attempt ended with the surrender of Fort Detroit to the British by General William Hull in late 1812. Although not present in large numbers, Ohio militia were present and paroled shortly thereafter with the promise not to engage in any further hostilities. Ohio militia also played a role in the efforts of Gen. William Henry Harrison to re-capture Fort Detroit and decisively defeat the British at the Battle of the Thames.

=== Mexican–American War ===
After the end of the inconclusive War of 1812, the militia system in Ohio abandoned its regimental formations and reverted to multiple small units representing the various municipalities throughout the rapidly growing state. With the last Indians expelled from the state's borders and peaceful relations along the Canada–US border, there seemed little need for a fully armed and trained militia. With the brief exception of a border dispute with Michigan that caused the governor to issue a militia call up, meaningful local militia musters and drills again became more the exception than the rule. The Mexican–American War in 1848 saw a renewed interest in vitalizing the militia throughout the entire country. With the regular U.S. Army at a strength of just over 13,000, it became evident that any successful military campaign against Mexico was going to require extensive militia involvement. Ohio played a significant role, raising several regiments of infantry and artillery batteries from existing militia units and volunteers. The 1st Ohio Volunteers were part of the army under Gen. Zachary Taylor and took part in the battlefield victories of Monterrey and Buena Vista.

=== The American Civil War ===
It was during the great Civil War however, that the Ohio National Guard can directly trace its start. Ohio played a critical part in the Union war effort and was one of the leading contributors of manpower (including a crop of gifted generals to include Grant, Sherman, Sheridan, McPherson, Griffin,). As most of the existing militia units were incorporated into federalized volunteer regiments, local defense and order fell to units of those exempted from federal service. Youths, middle aged men and a sprinkling of veterans who had completed their active duty enlistments stayed behind in Ohio. Numerous battalions were organized statewide that were for the first time titled "National Guard.". During the war the Ohio National Guard served in a variety of roles, providing not only guards at the Camp Chase and Johnson Island POW camps, but serving in a number of combat situations. During the September 1862 Confederate incursion into southeast Ohio and Morgan's Raid in July 1863, Ohio guardsmen were actively involved. While subjected to ridicule as a result of the lackluster performance of some poorly trained and armed local units, the Ohio National Guard in actuality played a key role in the ultimate defeat of Gen. Morgan (and his vaunted force of Confederate cavalry). Instrumental in defending the approaches to Pomeroy and its river fords, Ohio Guardsmen were also responsible for blocking Morgan's escape route at Buffington Island.Pursuing Union forces eventually caught up and administered a stinging defeat to Morgan on July 19, 1863 – the last battle fought on Ohio soil.

Over 35,000 Ohio Guardsmen were federalized and organized into regiments for 100 days service in May 1864. Shipped to the Eastern Theater, they were designed to be placed into "safe" rear area duty to protect the railroads and supply points. As events transpired, many units found themselves in the thick of combat, stationed in the path of Confederate Gen. Jubal Early's veteran Army of the Valley during its Raid on Washington. These Guard units participated in the battles of Monacacy, Fort Stevens, Maryland Heights, and in the siege of Petersburg. Ohio Guard units helped to blunt the Confederate offensive, thereby saving The District of Columbia from confederate capture. Significant casualties were incurred on all sides, but the Ohio Guardsmen were defiantly a significant part of the battle.

=== Mexican Border Crisis ===
With the end of the Civil War, the Ohio National Guard was rapidly demobilized and its extensive inventory placed into mothballs maintained by a few non-commissioned officers. From a war-time strength in excess of 50,000, by 1870 the Ohio National Guard had been allowed to dwindle to fewer than 500 officers and enlisted men. Yet Ohio officials soon rediscovered that the Ohio Guard was an essential asset in situations other than war. Like the rest of the nation, labor unrest started to spread in the latter part of the century resulting in violent strikes and crippling shutdowns, especially in the railroad industry. Ohio governors repeatedly called upon Ohio Guardsmen to keep the peace. In numerous situations the Guard's intervention resulted in the immediate restoration of peace and order and succeeded in keeping violence and property damage to a minimum. Having demonstrated its value beyond the battlefield, the Ohio Guard was boosted in numbers and funding to a meaningful level.

The breakout of hostilities with Spain over Cuba in 1898 also led to an increase in the size and improved equipment and training for the Ohio National Guard. Several regiments of infantry and artillery were formed and shipped to Tampa, Florida for training and eventual transport to the front lines in Cuba. Due to the rapid American success, the war ended prior to any of these units actually being deployed in a combat situation. The Spanish–American War thrust the United States into the role of a world power and both military and civilian leaders recognized that it was necessary to maintain a uniformly trained and armed military force. This reflected the slow evolution of the Ohio militia into a National Guard which in addition to being a state force for quelling civil disturbances, was assuming a key role in the national defense.

Leading the effort to accomplish this was Major General Charles Dick of the Ohio National Guard. After serving in the Spanish–American War, he was later elected to the U.S. Senate, where he was instrumental in passing the Dick Act of 1903. This benchmark legislation repealed the antiquated militia laws and effectively converted the various volunteer militias into the National Guard as we know it today. Under the Dick Act Guard units received increased federal funding and equipment. In return each state National Guard was required to conform to federal standards for training and organization. Rather than the periodic muster, each unit was expected to muster for a set number of monthly drills and an extended summer camp. Also, for the first time state Adjutant Generals had a formal relationship with the War Department. These common sense reforms were to pay their first dividends in 1916 when Ohio National Guard units were mobilized to serve as part of Gen. John Pershing's punitive expedition against Pancho Villa along the Mexican Border. Although the expedition failed to capture or dispatch the notorious Villa and his army of bandits, valuable lessons were learned in combined operations and mobile warfare. The relatively speedy and seamless mobilization and deployment to the desert regions of the southwest also served as a confidence builder for the units and their active duty counterparts. The errors and problems of the 1916 mobilization also proved to be excellent teaching tools that were to pay dividends when the entire Ohio Guard was to be mobilized by President Woodrow Wilson a scant 10 months later in April 1917

=== World War I ===
As war had broken out in Europe in 1914, the original intent of the United States was to avoid the conflict and maintain a stance of neutrality. As hostilities between the great European powers bogged down into a bloody stalemate, each side sought an edge to break the deadlock. For Germany, it was unrestricted submarine warfare. While this assisted in slowing down trade and supplies between the Allies and the United States, the result was to propel the United States into war as American merchant ships began to be targeted. After the United States joined the war in April 1917, the manpower requirements for a modern field army were so great that only with a draft could the ranks be filled. Congress passed the Selective Service Act, which decentralized the selection to local draft boards within each state. With this massive mobilization the strength of the Ohio National Guard expanded and was eventually organized into the 37th Division. To preserve its Ohio identity, they adopted the nickname of the "Buckeye" Division. Again under the overall leadership of "Black Jack" Pershing, Ohio Guardsmen were a key component of the American Expeditionary Force sent over to France. Rated by the German General Staff as one of the best six American divisions for combat effectiveness, the "Buckeye" Division proved its worth in numerous battles including the Meuse-Argonne Offensive and the St. Mihiel Salient. This reputation for being a crack unit came with a considerable cost as the Buckeye Division alone suffered almost 5400 casualties while in France. Ohio Guard units also formed part of the 42nd "Rainbow" Division which won an enviable combat record along the front lines.

=== World War II ===
During the period between the two World Wars, the Ohio National Guard found itself frequently called upon to perform relief duties during natural disasters. Noteworthy were efforts during the almost annual flooding of the Ohio River and the great tornado of 1924 in the Lorain and Sandusky area. Units were again utilized to keep the peace during a series of bitter strikes in the coal-mining region of southeast Ohio. Although initially perceived as being brought in to aid and assist the mine operators, they won begrudging respect for adopting a fair and even-handed approach. Unlike the bloody history associated with the use of the National Guard in labor disputes in many other states, the Ohio Guard's non-partisan approach alleviated numerous potentially explosive labor conflicts.

As the year 1939 brought yet another world war, the Ohio Guard found itself in a moderate state of readiness and under the leadership of Major General Robert S. Beightler. When President Franklin D. Roosevelt declared a state of emergency and brought the National Guard under federal control in October 1940, the Buckeye Division was among their ranks. Notably, Company C, 192nd Tank Battalion, from Camp Perry, Ohio, joined a provisional unit sent to the Philippines to bolster the active duty and Filipino forces there. When the Japanese attack on Pearl Harbor on 7 December 1941 brought the country into a declared war, the Ohio tankers found themselves under attack as Japanese forces landed in the Philippines within days. As the remnant defenders withdrew to Bataan, the 192nd disintegrated as a unit, its members eventually captured along with the others in 1942. These Ohioans, who had fought from the very beginning of the war, remained as prisoners for the duration.

The Buckeye Division participated in the Pacific theater of the war, serving in the Northern Solomons and Luzon (Philippines) campaigns. Entering combat in June 1943, they fought at New Georgia and Bougainville (in November 1943) alongside the 3rd Marine Division and others. March 1944 saw a ferocious attack by Japanese forces against the division at Bougainville, one which the stretched and weakened division fought off. January 1945 saw the division go ashore in Luzon as part of the XIV Corps, and by February it had liberated Manila.

The Buckeye Division produced seven Medal of Honor recipients during World War II. MG Beightler led the Buckeye Division throughout the course of the war, the only one of 32 National Guard division commanders to accomplish this.

=== The Cold War ===
The 37th Infantry Division was reformed in the OH ARNG in 1945–46. During this time period the Air Force also broke off from the Army to become a separate service branch. Within the Ohio Guard this was reflected in the creation of the Ohio Air National Guard.

==== Korean War era ====
The demobilization from World War II had barely taken place when once again the Ohio National Guard was mobilized for the Korean War. As part of the mobilization of National Guard divisions across the country, in 1952 the Buckeye Division activated to serve as a training division at then-Camp Polk, Louisiana. While no major Ohio Guard units were deployed as units to Korea during hostilities, National Guard units from Ohio were sent to Korea where individual soldiers from the units were then assigned to serve in the regular Army as replacements.

On April 22, 1951, the 987th Armored Field Artillery Battalion, a National Guard unit from Stark County, Ohio, was assigned by IX Corps, Eight Army, to provide support to a two-divisional attack "Reconnaissance-in-Force" in the north central part of the Korean peninsula, just below the 38th Longitudinal Parallel.

After the Korean War Armistice Agreement of 1953, the Ohio Guard's focus returned to its state mission and reorganization in accordance with federal mandates. Significant challenges were met by the continuing changes and advances in technology which required a flexible and better educated force. World events also continued to impact the Ohio Guard. The Berlin Crisis of 1961 resulted in the mobilization of ten Ohio Air and Army National Guard units to help counter the Soviet threat. It was during this period that the Ohio Guard's units switched over to the next United States Army division structure, the Reorganisation Objective Army Division (ROAD) structure. Most notable among these changes was the deactivation of the storied 37th "Buckeye" Division on February 15, 1968. Much of the former division's units became part of the 73d Infantry Brigade, 38th Infantry Division.

From 1959 to 1968, the 137th Air Defense Artillery Regiment was part of the force. The Headquarters and Headquarters Battery, 371st Antiaircraft Artillery Group, was consolidated on 1 September 1959 with the 103d Antiaircraft Artillery Detachment as the 371st Artillery Group. 2d and 3d Battalions, 137th ADA Regiment (2-137 & 3-137) served with 371 AGAD from 1 September 1959 to 1 February 1968, which 1-137 served with the 137 AGAD, until 1 April 1963, and then transferred to the 371 AGAD, 1 April 1963, to 1 February 1972.

==== Vietnam and Kent State ====
With the escalation of the Vietnam War, the Ohio Guard was again called upon to engage in combat upon foreign shores. Both the Ohio Army and Air National Guards deployed units to Southeast Asia during the Vietnam War. The mission to support state authorities still continued during this time with the Ohio Guard playing a key role in quelling a full-scale riot at the Ohio Penitentiary in 1968 and in helping to curb the violence associated with the trucker's strike in 1970. It was subsequent to this latter event that the Ohio Guard was involved in one of the most unfortunate events in its long history, the Kent State shootings of May 4, 1970. Called to the campus Kent State University to quell demonstrations and anti-war protests, members of the guard — in what was recently described as "one of America's most horrific campus tragedies" — killed four unarmed students and wounded several more, garnering severely negative international attention and criticism, especially as some of the victims were simply passersby.

==== Later years ====
After the United States withdrew from Vietnam, the Ohio Guard, like the rest of the military, was faced by the challenges of significantly decreased funding and adapting to new missions. Increasing attention was directed towards peace-keeping and civic assistance missions. Of particular success were the efforts of the Ohio Guard in saving lives and aiding hard pressed local authorities during the winter blizzards of 1977 and 1978. Also of note was the extensive mission to Honduras which provided considerable infrastructure improvement and medical assistance to an impoverished nation while at the same time providing valuable training experience to Ohio Guard personnel.

In organization terms, the 73rd Brigade was released from assignment to the 38th ID in 1977, and was redesignated the 73rd Infantry Brigade (Separate). The brigade comprised three Infantry battalions (1-147th INF, 1-148th INF, and 1-166th INF) and a Field Artillery battalion (1-136th FA) equipped with towed 105mm howitzers. In 1980, the brigade was given the war-time mission of being a Theater Defense Brigade to defend the Aleutian Islands.

During the draw down of forces after the Cold War, in 1993, units of the 73rd and the 107th Armored Cavalry Regiment consolidated to form the 37th Brigade, 28th Infantry Division. A year later, the brigade was reunited with the 38th Infantry Division.

=== Desert Storm and beyond ===
When Iraq invaded Kuwait in August 1990, the Ohio National Guard provided numerous transportation, logistical and other combat support units to assist in Operation Desert Storm. Additionally, numerous individual Ohio Guardsmen with specialty skills volunteered and served in Operation Desert Storm.

Although active hostilities ceased in February 1991 after a lightning campaign, the continuing presence of Saddam Hussein required continued military presence in the Persian Gulf region. The Ohio Guard continued in its role as key player as its Air National Guard units were routinely deployed to enforce the no-fly zones over Iraq as part of Operation Northern Watch. Other Ohio Guard units were periodically deployed to the Persian Gulf and Kuwait to engage in joint desert warfare training. Ohio Guardsmen also saw overseas service in a demanding environment when deployed to the Balkans to provide peacekeeping support in war–torn Bosnia and Kosovo. Units of the Ohio Guard continued to take a role in providing humanitarian assistance in impoverished areas of Central America. Engineering, transportation and medical detachments provided medical care as well as building roads, wells, bridges, schools and other infrastructure.

On the domestic front the Ohio Guard fulfilled its role in assisting civilian authorities in maintaining order in extraordinary circumstances. A significant number of Ohio Guardsmen were activated in 1993 to help quell the deadly prison riots at the Lucasville Correctional Facility. Personnel from the Ohio Guard also provided crucial advice and stood by to provide law enforcement support during rioting in Cincinnati and civic unrest surrounding the operation of a toxic waste incinerator plant near East Liverpool. Disaster relief also continued to be a priority mission with service during the Shadyside floods, tornadoes, snow emergencies and Ohio River flooding.

After the attacks of September 11, numerous units from the Army Guard supplemented by security police units of the Air Guard were mobilized on short notice in the following days and executed critical security missions at various locations for extended periods of time. Other communications and engineering units deployed to the Persian Gulf area and Afghanistan in support of the war on terrorism.

In 2005, The Ohio Army National Guard deployed the 37th Brigade Combat Team, 73rd Troop Command, 16th Engineer Brigade, 416th Engineer group, 145th Regiment (Regional Training Institute), 196th Mobile Public Affairs Detachment, 112th Engineer Battalion, 216th Engineer Battalion, 731st Transportation Battalion in response to Hurricane Katrina. The Ohio National Guard sent 1,500 troops to Louisiana and Mississippi to haul relief supplies such as food, water and ice; the engineering units cleared debris and helped to open roads.

25 Ohio National Guard soldiers were among the 1,500 troops that were deployed to Middle East amid tensions with Iran. The Ohio troops were stationed in Kuwait.

== Transformation ==
As of late 2006, the Ohio Army National Guard began a process of transformation in line with the overall transformation of all active and National Guard units. Ohio will activate two new modular units, the 37th Infantry Brigade Combat Team and the 371st Sustainment Brigade. The 16th Engineer Brigade, a current formation, will have two of its subordinate commands, the 512th and 612th Engineer Battalions, inactivated. Some parts of the 73d Troop Command will also undergo changes.

The result, when completed by September 2007, will be an Ohio Army National Guard organized under a Joint Force Headquarters and made up of five major commands: the 37th Infantry BCT, the 16th Engineer Brigade, the 174th Air Defense Artillery Brigade, the 73d Joint Task Force, and the 371st Sustainment Brigade. All of this will occur with minimal changes in the end strength of the OHARNG at 10,300 Soldiers.

The 37th Infantry BCT will be one of 34 combat brigades in the Army National Guard. Its core is two infantry battalions and a fires battalion:

- 1st Battalion, 148th Infantry Regiment
- 1st Battalion, 125th Infantry Regiment (Michigan Army National Guard)
- 1st Battalion, 134th Field Artillery Regiment
- 1st Squadron (RSTA), 126th Cavalry Regiment (Michigan Army National Guard)
- 237th Brigade Support Battalion
- Special Troops Battalion, 37th IBCT

Remaining combat units in the State of Ohio have also been realigned. The 1st Battalion, 107th Cavalry, along with one company from the 148th Infantry and one company from the 112th Engineer Battalion, transformed into the 1st Battalion, 145th Armored Regiment and, together with the 2d Squadron, 107th Cavalry, were briefly elements of the 2d Brigade Combat Team, 28th Infantry Division, Pennsylvania Army National Guard. Currently, both the 1st Battalion, 145th Armored and the 2d Squadron, 107th Cavalry belong to the 174th Air Defense Artillery Brigade for day-to-day command and control purposes. In addition, there are elements of the 137th Aviation Regiment in the state, previously part of the 18th Aviation Brigade before it was inactivated.

Additional changes will occur with the subsidiary units of the 73d Troop Command.

As a consequence of the transformation of the 37th into an infantry brigade combat team, the unit is to be given the old Buckeye Patch of the 37th Infantry Division of World War I and World War II.

== Foreign partnerships ==
The Ohio Army National Guard has maintained military partnerships with foreign militaries under the National Guard State Partnership Program. The OARNG, together with the Ohio Air National Guard, has worked with Hungary since 1993, and the program's inception, and in September 2006 initiated a second program with Serbia. The purpose of the program is to provide assistance to the host countries in establishing reserve military forces like the National Guard, before transitioning to follow-on programs designed to assist the citizen-soldiers in their non-military lives.

== Organization ==
As of February 2026 the Ohio Army National Guard consists of the following units:

- Joint Force Headquarters-Ohio, Army Element, in Columbus
  - Headquarters and Headquarters Company, Joint Force Headquarters-Ohio, Army Element, in Columbus
  - Ohio Recruiting & Retention Battalion, in Columbus
  - Ohio Medical Detachment, in Columbus
  - Training Center Camp James A. Garfield, in Newton Falls
  - Training Center Camp Perry, in Port Clinton
  - Training Center Camp Sherman, in Chillicothe
  - Army Aviation Support Facility #1, at Akron-Canton Airport
  - Army Aviation Support Facility #2, at Rickenbacker International Airport
  - Combined Support Maintenance Shop #1, in Columbus
  - Unit Training Equipment Site #1, at Camp James A. Garfield
  - Field Maintenance Shop #1, in Mansfield
  - Field Maintenance Shop #3, in Cleveland
  - Field Maintenance Shop #4, in Stow
  - Field Maintenance Shop #6, in North Canton
  - Field Maintenance Shop #9, at Camp Sherman, Ohio|Camp Sherman
  - Field Maintenance Shop #11, in Hamilton
  - Field Maintenance Shop #12, in Kettering
  - Field Maintenance Shop #15, in Lima
  - 16th Engineer Brigade, in Columbus
    - Headquarters and Headquarters Company, 16th Engineer Brigade, in Columbus
    - 204th Engineer Detachment (Construction Management Team), in Columbus
    - 112th Engineer Battalion, in Brook Park
      - Headquarters and Headquarters Company, 112th Engineer Battalion, in Brook Park
      - Forward Support Company, 112th Engineer Battalion, in Brook Park
      - 291st Engineer Detachment (Concrete Section), at Camp James A. Garfield
      - 292nd Engineer Detachment (Asphalt), at Camp James A. Garfield
      - 812th Engineer Company (Sapper), in Lorain
      - 945th Engineer Company (Engineer Support Company), in Norwalk
      - 1192nd Engineer Company (Engineer Construction Company), at Camp James A. Garfield
      - 5694th Engineer Detachment (Fire Fighting Team — HQ), in Mansfield
      - 295th Engineer Detachment (Fire Fighting Team — Fire Truck), in Mansfield
      - 296th Engineer Detachment (Fire Fighting Team — Fire Truck), in Mansfield
    - 216th Engineer Battalion, in Cincinnati
      - Headquarters and Headquarters Company, 216th Engineer Battalion, in Cincinnati
      - Forward Support Company, 216th Engineer Battalion, in Cincinnati
      - 811th Engineer Company (Combat Engineer Company — Infantry), in Amanda
      - 1137th Signal Company (Tactical Installation/Networking), in Springfield
      - 1191st Engineer Company (Engineer Construction Company), in Portsmouth
      - 1194th Engineer Company (Vertical Construction Company), at Camp Sherman
    - 5th Battalion (Brigade Engineer), 54th Security Force Assistance Brigade, in Columbus
      - Headquarters and Headquarters Company, 5th Battalion (Brigade Engineer), 54th Security Force Assistance Brigade, in Columbus
      - Company A, 5th Battalion (Brigade Engineer), 54th Security Force Assistance Brigade, in Columbus
      - Company B, 5th Battalion (Brigade Engineer), 54th Security Force Assistance Brigade, in Columbus
      - Company C, 5th Battalion (Brigade Engineer), 54th Security Force Assistance Brigade, in Columbus
      - Company D, 5th Battalion (Brigade Engineer), 54th Security Force Assistance Brigade, in Columbus
  - 37th Infantry Brigade Combat Team, in Columbus (part of 38th Infantry Division)
    - Headquarters and Headquarters Company, 37th Infantry Brigade Combat Team, in Columbus
    - Detachment 1, Headquarters Support Company, Headquarters and Headquarters Battalion, 38th Infantry Division, in Columbus
    - 2nd Squadron, 107th Cavalry Regiment, in Hamilton
      - Headquarters and Headquarters Troop, 2nd Squadron, 107th Cavalry Regiment, in Hamilton
      - Troop A, 2nd Squadron, 107th Cavalry Regiment, in Greenville
      - Troop B, 2nd Squadron, 107th Cavalry Regiment, in Lebanon
      - Troop C (Dismounted), 2nd Squadron, 107th Cavalry Regiment, in Middletown
    - 1st Battalion, 118th Infantry Regiment, in Mount Pleasant (SC) — (South Carolina Army National Guard)
    - 1st Battalion, 125th Infantry Regiment, in Saginaw (MI) — (Michigan Army National Guard)
    - 1st Battalion, 148th Infantry Regiment, in Walbridge
      - Headquarters and Headquarters Company, 1st Battalion, 148th Infantry Regiment, in Walbridge
      - Company A, 1st Battalion, 148th Infantry Regiment, in Walbridge
      - Company B, 1st Battalion, 148th Infantry Regiment, in Bowling Green
      - Company C, 1st Battalion, 148th Infantry Regiment, in Tiffin
      - Company D (Weapons), 1st Battalion, 148th Infantry Regiment, in Sandusky
    - 1st Battalion, 134th Field Artillery Regiment, in Delaware
      - Headquarters and Headquarters Battery, 1st Battalion, 134th Field Artillery Regiment, in Delaware
        - Detachment 1, Headquarters and Headquarters Battery, 1st Battalion, 134th Field Artillery Regiment, at McCrady Training Center (SC) — (South Carolina Army National Guard)
        - Detachment 3, Headquarters and Headquarters Battery, 1st Battalion, 134th Field Artillery Regiment, in Saginaw (MI) — (Michigan Army National Guard)
      - Battery A, 1st Battalion, 134th Field Artillery Regiment, in Delaware
      - Battery B, 1st Battalion, 134th Field Artillery Regiment, in Piqua
      - Battery C, 1st Battalion, 134th Field Artillery Regiment, in Marysville
    - 837th Brigade Engineer Battalion, in Springfield
      - Headquarters and Headquarters Company, 837th Brigade Engineer Battalion, in Springfield
      - Company A (Combat Engineer), 837th Brigade Engineer Battalion, in Wooster
      - Company B (Combat Engineer), 837th Brigade Engineer Battalion, in Lima
      - Company C (Signal), 837th Brigade Engineer Battalion, in Columbus
      - Company D (Military Intelligence), 837th Brigade Engineer Battalion, in Lansing (MI) — (Michigan Army National Guard)
    - 237th Brigade Support Battalion, in Cleveland
      - Headquarters and Headquarters Company, 237th Brigade Support Battalion, in Cleveland
      - Company A (Distribution), 237th Brigade Support Battalion, in Cleveland
      - Company B (Maintenance), 237th Brigade Support Battalion, in Youngstown
      - Company C (Medical), 237th Brigade Support Battalion, in Akron
      - Company D (Forward Support), 237th Brigade Support Battalion, in Hamilton — attached to 2nd Squadron, 107th Cavalry Regiment
      - Company E (Forward Support), 237th Brigade Support Battalion, in Springfield — attached to 837th Brigade Engineer Battalion
      - Company F (Forward Support), 237th Brigade Support Battalion, in Mansfield — attached to 1st Battalion, 134th Field Artillery Regiment
      - Company G (Forward Support), 237th Brigade Support Battalion, in Lima — attached to 1st Battalion, 148th Infantry Regiment
      - Company H (Forward Support), 237th Brigade Support Battalion, in Bay City (MI) — attached to 1st Battalion, 125th Infantry Regiment (Michigan Army National Guard)
      - Company I (Forward Support), 237th Brigade Support Battalion, at Joint Base Charleston (SC) — attached to 1st Battalion, 118th Infantry Regiment (South Carolina Army National Guard)
    - 1st Battalion, 145th Armored Regiment, Stow (part of 1st Armored Brigade Combat Team, 34th Infantry Division)
      - Headquarters and Headquarters Company, 1st Battalion, 145th Armored Regiment, in Stow
        - Detachment 2, Headquarters and Headquarters Battery, 1st Battalion, 125th Field Artillery Regiment, in Stow
      - Company A (Tank), 1st Battalion, 145th Armored Regiment, at Camp James A. Garfield
      - Company B (Tank), 1st Battalion, 145th Armored Regiment, in North Canton
      - Company C (Mechanized Infantry), 1st Battalion, 145th Armored Regiment, in Alliance
      - Company H (Forward Support), 134th Support Battalion, in Stow
  - 28th Division Sustainment Brigade, in Springfield (part of 28th Infantry Division)
    - 28th Division Sustainment Troops Battalion, in Springfield
      - Headquarters and Headquarters Company, 28th Division Sustainment Brigade, in Springfield
        - Detachment 1, Headquarters and Headquarters Company, 28th Division Sustainment Brigade, in Newark
      - 137th Signal Company, in Springfield
      - 211th Ordnance Company (Support Maintenance), in Newark
      - 212th Ordnance Company (Support Maintenance), in Medina
      - 871st Quartermaster Platoon (Field Feeding), at Camp James A. Garfield
      - 874th Quartermaster Platoon (Field Feeding), at Camp James A. Garfield
      - 1937th Support Detachment (Contracting Team), in Columbus
    - 112th Medical Battalion (Multifunctional), in Columbus
      - Headquarters and Headquarters Detachment, 112th Medical Battalion (Multifunctional), in Columbus
      - 285th Medical Company (Area Support), in Columbus
      - 684th Medical Company (Area Support), in Columbus
    - 112th Transportation Battalion (Motor), in North Canton
      - Headquarters and Headquarters Detachment, 112th Transportation Battalion (Motor), in North Canton
      - 1482nd Transportation Company (Medium Truck) (Cargo), in Columbus
      - 1483rd Transportation Company (Medium Truck) (Cargo), in Walbridge
      - 1484th Transportation Company (Light-Medium Truck), in North Canton
      - 1485th Transportation Company (Medium Truck) (Cargo), in Coshocton
        - Detachment 1, 1485th Transportation Company (Medium Truck) (Cargo), in Dover
      - 1486th Transportation Company (Medium Truck) (Cargo), in Mansfield
      - 1487th Transportation Company (Medium Truck) (Cargo), in Piqua
    - 728th Division Sustainment Support Battalion, in Spring City (PA) — (Pennsylvania Army National Guard)
  - 73rd Troop Command, in Columbus
    - Headquarters and Headquarters Company, 73rd Troop Command, in Columbus
    - Company B, 2nd Battalion, 19th Special Forces Group (Airborne), in Columbus
    - 52nd Civil Support Team (WMD), in Columbus
    - 571st Judge Advocate General Trial Defense Team, in Columbus
    - 671st Judge Advocate General Trial Defense Team, in Columbus
    - 1st Battalion (Assault), 137th Aviation Regiment, at Rickenbacker International Airport (part of 38th Combat Aviation Brigade)
      - Headquarters and Headquarters Company, 1st Battalion (Assault), 137th Aviation Regiment, at Rickenbacker International Airport
      - Company A, 1st Battalion (Assault), 137th Aviation Regiment, at Rickenbacker International Airport (UH-60M Black Hawk)
      - Company B, 1st Battalion (Assault), 137th Aviation Regiment, at Rickenbacker International Airport (UH-60M Black Hawk)
      - Company D (Aviation Unit Maintenance), 1st Battalion (Assault), 137th Aviation Regiment, at Rickenbacker International Airport
      - Company E (Forward Support), 1st Battalion (Assault), 137th Aviation Regiment, at Rickenbacker International Airport
      - Detachment 2, Headquarters and Headquarters Company, 3rd Battalion (General Support Aviation), 238th Aviation Regiment, at Akron-Canton Airport
      - Company B (Heavy Lift), 3rd Battalion (General Support Aviation), 238th Aviation Regiment, at Akron-Canton Airport (CH-47F Chinook)
      - Detachment 2, Company C (MEDEVAC), 3rd Battalion (General Support Aviation), 238th Aviation Regiment, at Akron-Canton Airport (HH-60M Black Hawk)
      - Detachment 2, Company D (Aviation Unit Maintenance), 3rd Battalion (General Support Aviation), 238th Aviation Regiment, at Akron-Canton Airport
      - Detachment 2, Company E (Forward Support), 3rd Battalion (General Support Aviation), 238th Aviation Regiment, at Akron-Canton Airport
      - Detachment 1, Company D (MEDEVAC), 3rd Battalion (Security & Support), 376th Aviation Regiment, at Akron-Canton Airport (UH-72A Lakota)
      - Company B (Aviation Intermediate Maintenance), 638th Aviation Support Battalion, at Akron-Canton Airport
      - Detachment 2, Company A, 2nd Battalion (Fixed Wing), 641st Aviation Regiment (Detachment 21, Operational Support Airlift Activity), at Rickenbacker International Airport (C-26 Metroliner)
    - 155th Chemical Battalion, in Kettering
      - Headquarters and Headquarters Company, 155th Chemical Battalion, in Kettering
      - Cyber Protection Team 172, in Columbus
      - 122nd Army Band, in Columbus
      - 173rd Chemical Detachment, in Kettering
      - 196th Mobile Public Affairs Detachment, in Columbus
      - 637th Chemical Company, in Kettering
    - 437th Military Police Battalion, in Columbus
      - Headquarters and Headquarters Detachment, 437th Military Police Battalion, in Columbus
      - 135th Military Police Company (Combat Support), in Chagrin Falls
      - 323rd Military Police Company (Combat Support), in Toledo
      - 324th Military Police Company (Detention), in Middletown
      - 838th Military Police Company (Combat Support), in Youngstown
  - 174th Air Defense Artillery Brigade, in Columbus
    - Headquarters and Headquarters Battery, 174th Air Defense Artillery Brigade, in Columbus
    - 1st Battalion, 174th Air Defense Artillery Regiment, in Cincinnati (AN/TWQ-1 Avenger)
      - Headquarters and Headquarters Battery, 1st Battalion, 174th Air Defense Artillery Regiment, in Cincinnati
      - Battery A, 1st Battalion, 174th Air Defense Artillery Regiment, in Cincinnati
      - Battery B, 1st Battalion, 174th Air Defense Artillery Regiment, in Cincinnati
      - Battery C, 1st Battalion, 174th Air Defense Artillery Regiment, in Marysville
      - Service Battery, 1st Battalion, 174th Air Defense Artillery Regiment, in Cincinnati
    - 2nd Battalion, 174th Air Defense Artillery Regiment, in McConnelsville (AN/TWQ-1 Avenger)
      - Headquarters and Headquarters Battery, 2nd Battalion, 174th Air Defense Artillery Regiment, in McConnelsville
      - Battery A, 2nd Battalion, 174th Air Defense Artillery Regiment, in McConnelsville
      - Battery B, 2nd Battalion, 174th Air Defense Artillery Regiment, in McConnelsville
      - Battery C, 2nd Battalion, 174th Air Defense Artillery Regiment, in McConnelsville
      - Service Battery, 2nd Battalion, 174th Air Defense Artillery Regiment, in McConnelsville
  - 147th Regiment, Regional Training Institute, in Columbus
    - 1st Battalion (Engineer)
    - 2nd Battalion (General Studies)

== Historic units ==
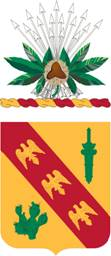
- 107th Cavalry Regiment
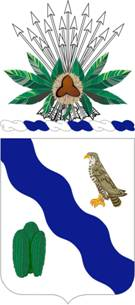
- 145th Infantry Regiment
- 146th Infantry Regiment
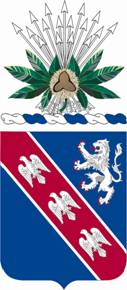
- 147th Infantry Regiment
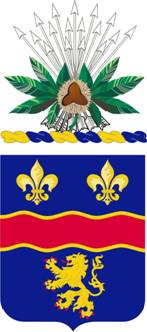
- 148th Infantry Regiment
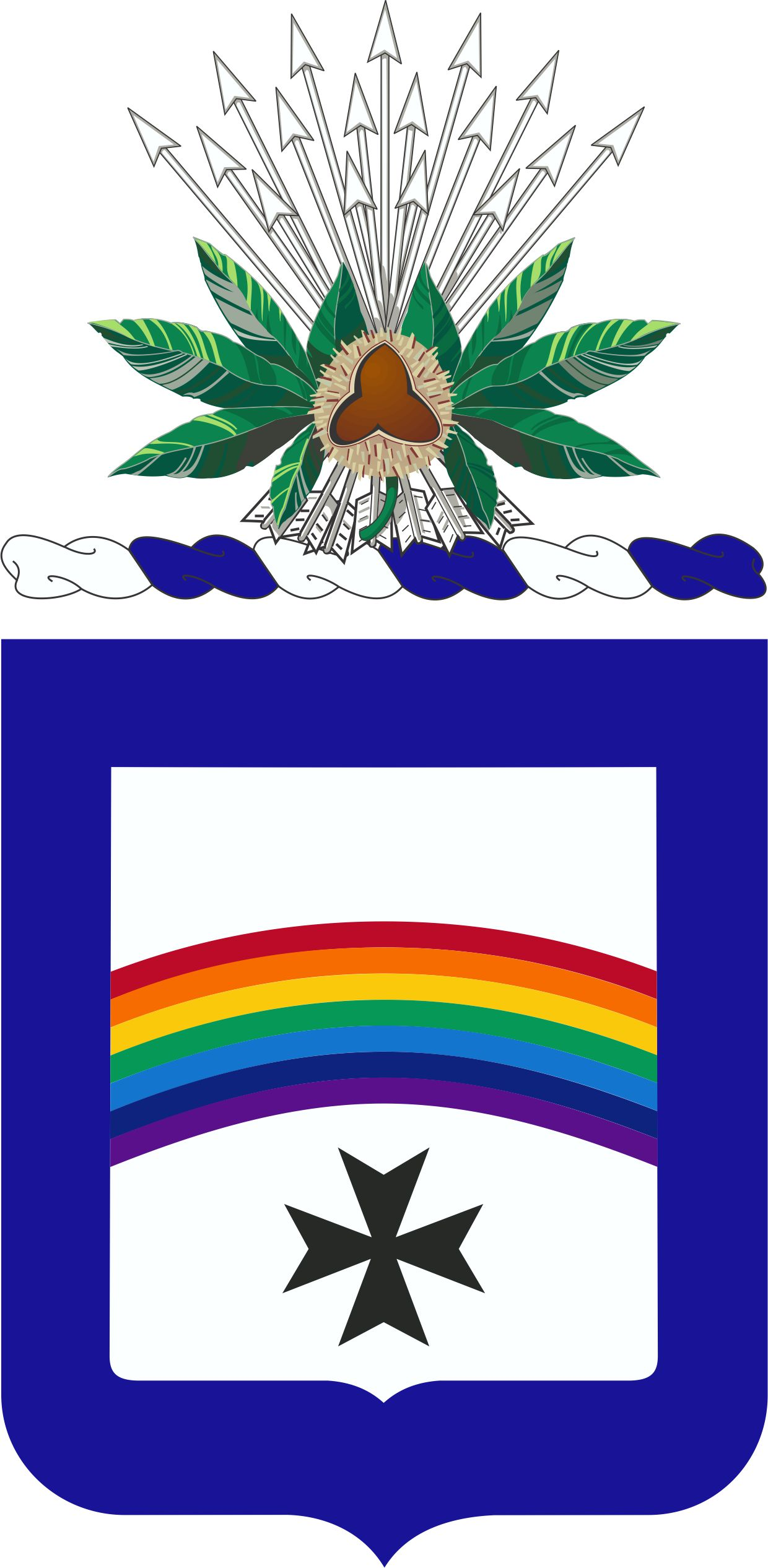
- 166th Infantry Regiment
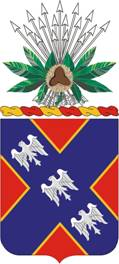
- 134th Field Artillery Regiment
