= Butler, Missouri =

- City
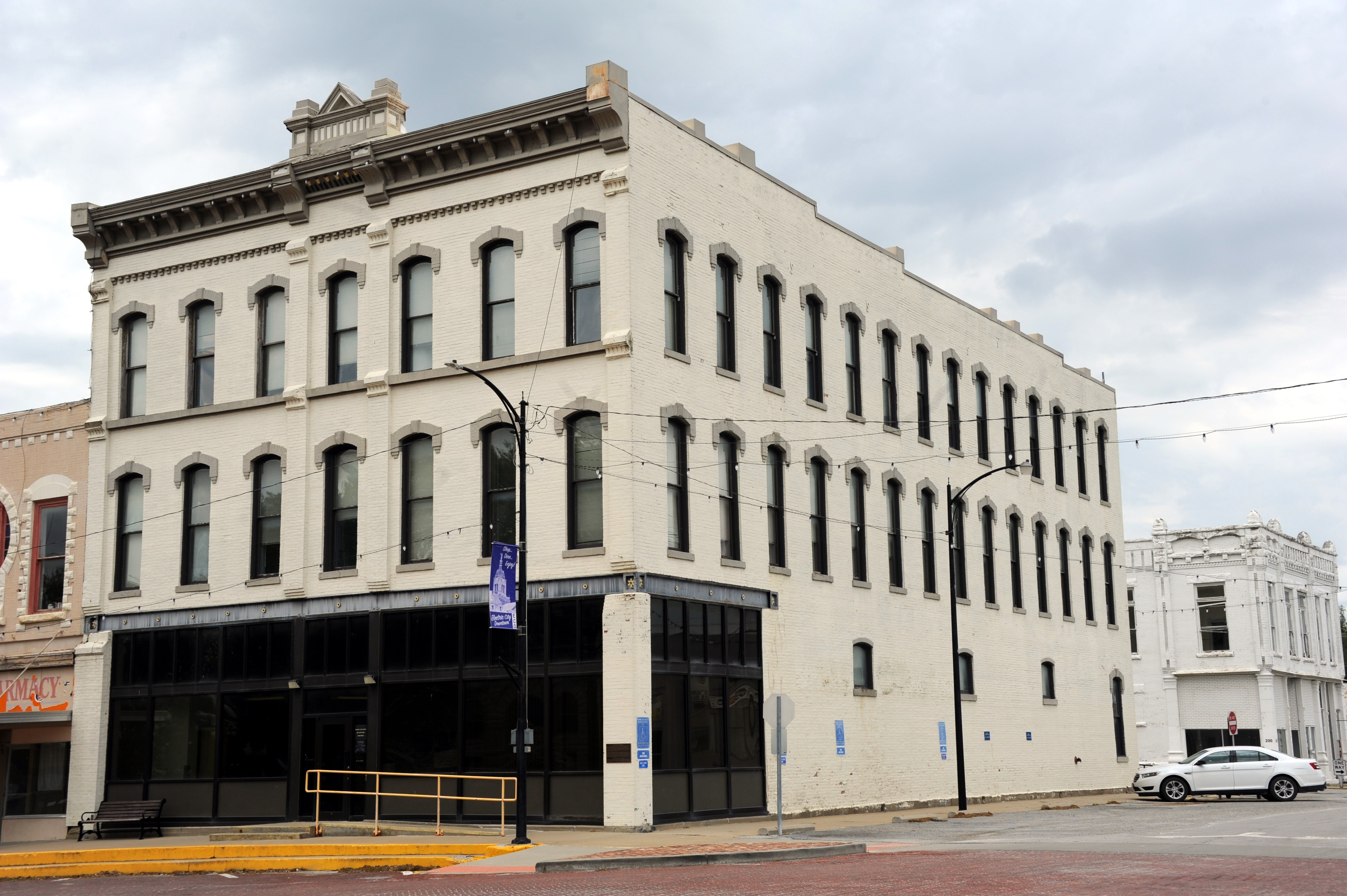
- Palace Hotel
- Nickname: The Electric City
- Location within Bates County and Missouri
- Coordinates: 38°15′35″N 94°20′22″W
- Country: United States
- State: Missouri
- County: Bates
- Incorporated: 1858

Area
  - Total: 4.08 sq mi (10.56 km^{2})
  - Land: 4.07 sq mi (10.53 km^{2})
  - Water: 0.0077 sq mi (0.02 km^{2})
- Elevation: 866 ft (264 m)

Population (2020)
  - Total: 4,220
  - Density: 1,037.7/sq mi (400.64/km^{2})
- Time zone: UTC−6 (Central (CST))
  - Summer (DST): UTC−5 (CDT)
- ZIP Code: 64730
- Area code: 660
- FIPS code: 29-10054
- GNIS feature ID: 2393483
- Website: www.cityofbutlermo.com

Butler is a city in and the county seat of Bates County, Missouri, United States and is part of the Kansas City metropolitan area. The population was 4,220 at the 2020 census.The city is named for William Orlando Butler, an American military and political figure of the early and mid-19th century. It is located approximately 50 mi (80 km) south of Kansas City, Missouri on Interstate 49.

== History ==
When laid out in April 1852, Butler was a short distance from its modern location, with John C. Kennett being recognized as the first settler to build a home. The plat for Butler was filed in August, 1853 and consisted of five lots on fifty-five acres of donated land. The first county seat for Bates County was Papinville.

After a large portion of the county was split off to form Vernon County in 1855, Papinville was no longer near the geographic center, and Butler was selected in 1856 as the county seat. County officials shortly thereafter selected the contracting firm of Fitzpatrick & Hurt to construct a fifty-by-fifty foot brick courthouse at a cost of $5,000. This building served the county until being gutted by fire in 1861. The year 1856 also saw the establishment of Butler's first general mercantile store was established in 1856, with several others following in the years prior to the Civil War's outbreak in 1861.

=== Civil War ===
During the Civil War western Missouri was engulfed in insurgent Confederate actions and raids by Union forces. Personal conflicts were also played out in the war's violence. Early in the conflict a major fire destroyed not only the Bates County courthouse but nearly all of the surrounding square of businesses and the town's first church. The arson fire was the handiwork of a squad of volunteer Kansas cavalry acting on orders of Jayhawker Colonel James Montgomery. A company of pro-Confederate Missouri State Guard cavalry under Sidney D. Jackman arrived too late to stop the arson, but they pursued the Kansans back across the border, killing and wounding several. During much of the spring and summer of 1862, the town was occupied by Union Colonel Fitz Henry Warren and elements of the 1st Regiment Iowa Volunteer Cavalry. Arriving in April, they stayed until mid-August when they left for Clinton, Missouri, followed closely by Confederate troops under Colonel Jackman and General Vard Cockrell. The opposing groups would finally meet a few days later at the Battle of Lone Jack in Jackson county.

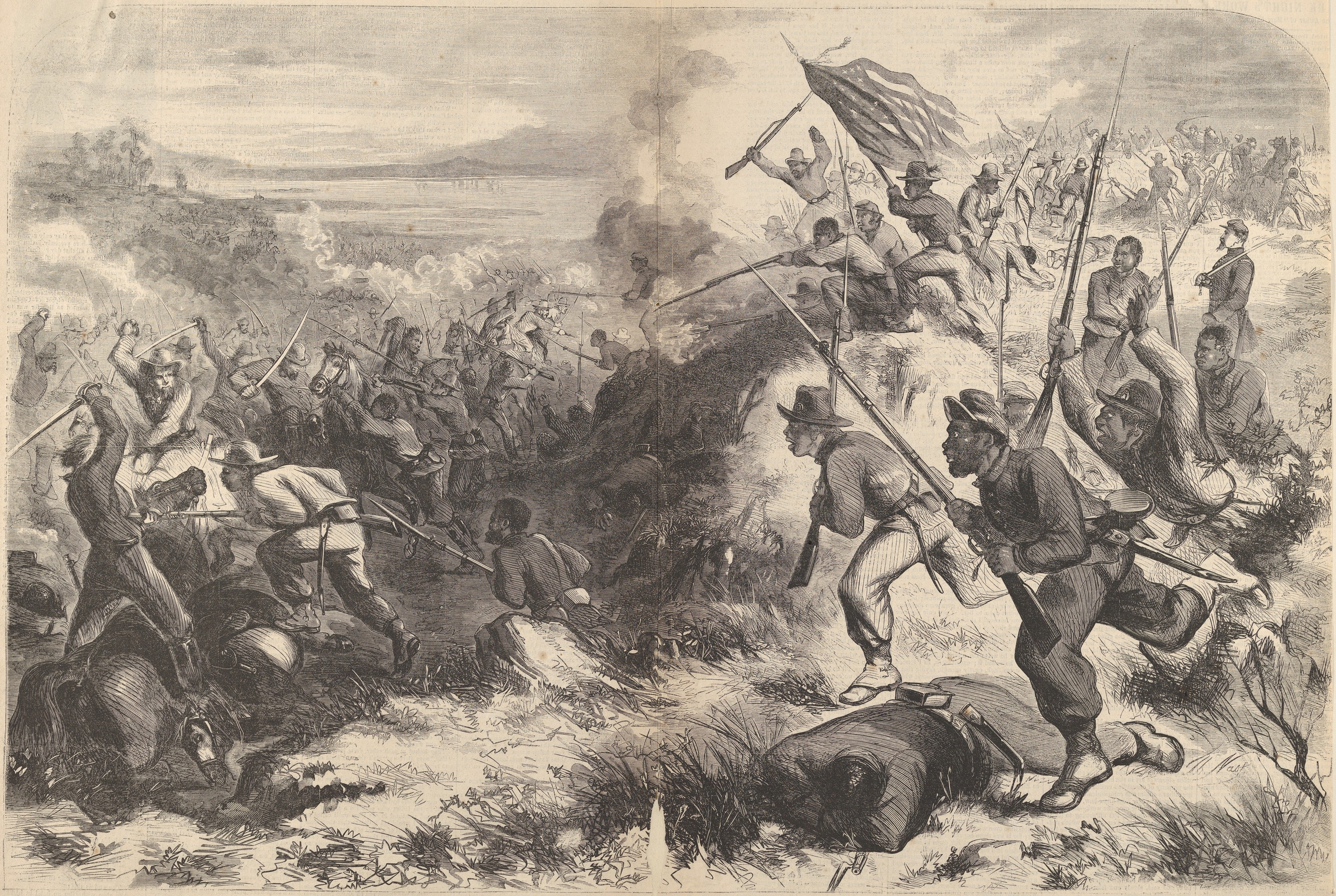
The Battle of Island Mound as depicted in an 1863 Harper's Weekly woodcut.

Two months later a Civil War milestone took place in Bates County at a site approximately eight miles southwest of Butler. This was the first combat against Confederates by African Americans fighting for the Union. During the Battle of Island Mound (aka "Battle of Fort Toothman") on October 28–29, 1862, the Union 1st Kansas Colored Volunteers—composed of former slaves who had escaped from Arkansas and Missouri—and a scouting element from the 5th Kansas Volunteer Cavalry engaged a numerically superior force of Confederate guerrillas and recent Missouri State Guard recruits led by Vard Cockrell and Bill Truman (a relative of future President Harry S. Truman). The Union forces crossed into Missouri on a mission to clear Confederate guerrillas from an area known as "Hog Island". The Union troops commandeered and fortified the homestead of Confederate guerrilla Enoch John Toothman. The next day a detachment engaged with mounted Confederate cavalry, but stood their ground. The Confederates withdrew from the area on October 29. Eight Union men and an estimated 30 to 40 Confederates were killed.

On August 25, 1863 Union Army General Thomas Ewing issued his controversial Order No. 11, requiring evacuation of all rural residents from the county. Ostensibly it was a response to the raid on Lawrence, Kansas by Confederate guerrillas under William Quantrill and a means to cut off materiel support for further bushwhacker activity. Opponents believed it was a personal vendetta by Ewing, an abolitionist from Kansas who lost several friends in the raid. Order No. 11 called for the forced evacuation of the rural residents of Bates and three other border counties (Cass, Jackson, and Vernon) within 15 days of issuance. All rural residents of the affected counties, regardless of their allegiance, were forced to leave their farms and homes.

Those who could prove their loyalty to the Union were allowed to remain in the counties but required to move to communities near Union military outposts. Those unwilling or unable to prove loyalty were ordered to move from the counties altogether or face imprisonment. Among the forced evacuees were Solomon and Hattie (Gregg) Young and their daughter Martha, the maternal grandparents and mother of future President Harry Truman. Butler was left a virtual ghost town. When residents returned later near war's end, the town and much of the county as a whole had been burned, looted, and otherwise destroyed by regular Union forces, pro-Union Jayhawkers, and Kansas "Red Legs".

=== Post-Bellum ===
A temporary structure for county business and court activities was constructed in late 1865 but proved inadequate. In 1869 a much larger two-story brick courthouse was constructed at a cost of $23,000. While slowly continuing its recovery, Butler was finally incorporated as a village on June 19, 1872. Seven years later, on April 7, 1879 Butler was reincorporated as a fourth-class city, with William Page serving as the first mayor. Numerous mills and grain elevators became part of the growing Butler business community through the 1870s, providing opportunities for surrounding farms to process wool and various grains.

Butler gained electric power in 1881, being one of the first communities west of the Mississippi River to offer that convenience. Four large lights were mounted atop the Bates County courthouse, providing illumination for the downtown area. Butler became known as "The Electric City." The 1869 courthouse survived until 1899 when it was found to be structurally unsound; it was closed and demolished.

After passage of a bond issue, construction of the new Bates County Courthouse began in 1901. The eighty-by-one hundred five foot Romanesque-style structure was built of "Carthage stone" from southern Missouri at a total project cost of $50,000 and was occupied in July, 1902. By the early 20th century Butler's business listings included three banks, an opera house, four hotels, and a large number of general and specialty stores.

In 2008 Bates county residents erected a statue and plaque honoring the 1st Kansas Colored Volunteers and the Battle of Island Mound on the grounds of the Bates County courthouse in Butler. The State of Missouri purchased a 40-acre property including part of the former Toothman homestead and established the "Battle of Island Mound State Historic Site" in October 2012.

The Bates County Courthouse and Palace Hotel are listed on the National Register of Historic Places.

A field near the Butler Memorial Airport was the site of a skydiving plane crash on June 14, 2026.

== Geography ==
The city is on US Route 71 and Missouri Route 52. Rich Hill is ten miles south and Adrian is 8.5 miles north.

According to the United States Census Bureau, the city has a total area of 4.08 square miles (10.57 km^{2}), of which 4.07 square miles (10.54 km^{2}) is land and 0.01 square miles (0.03 km^{2}) is water.

=== Climate ===
Climate data for Butler 4W, Missouri (1991–2020 normals, extremes 1946–present)
Month	Jan	Feb	Mar	Apr	May	Jun	Jul	Aug	Sep	Oct	Nov	Dec	Year
Record high °F (°C)	75 (24)	79 (26)	87 (31)	93 (34)	95 (35)	104 (40)	117 (47)	110 (43)	109 (43)	97 (36)	83 (28)	75 (24)	117 (47)
Mean daily maximum °F (°C)	40.1 (4.5)	45.7 (7.6)	56.4 (13.6)	66.2 (19.0)	75.7 (24.3)	84.7 (29.3)	89.5 (31.9)	88.4 (31.3)	80.8 (27.1)	70.0 (21.1)	55.8 (13.2)	44.6 (7.0)	66.5 (19.2)
Daily mean °F (°C)	30.0 (−1.1)	34.6 (1.4)	44.8 (7.1)	54.7 (12.6)	65.3 (18.5)	74.8 (23.8)	79.3 (26.3)	77.4 (25.2)	69.1 (20.6)	57.5 (14.2)	44.7 (7.1)	34.5 (1.4)	55.6 (13.1)
Mean daily minimum °F (°C)	19.8 (−6.8)	23.5 (−4.7)	33.2 (0.7)	43.2 (6.2)	55.0 (12.8)	64.9 (18.3)	69.1 (20.6)	66.4 (19.1)	57.4 (14.1)	45.0 (7.2)	33.5 (0.8)	24.5 (−4.2)	44.6 (7.0)
Record low °F (°C)	−19 (−28)	−24 (−31)	−8 (−22)	12 (−11)	27 (−3)	40 (4)	45 (7)	44 (7)	29 (−2)	18 (−8)	1 (−17)	−26 (−32)	−26 (−32)
Average precipitation inches (mm)	1.61 (41)	1.95 (50)	2.76 (70)	4.55 (116)	6.26 (159)	5.62 (143)	4.37 (111)	3.75 (95)	4.31 (109)	3.45 (88)	2.86 (73)	2.10 (53)	43.59 (1,107)
Average snowfall inches (cm)	2.6 (6.6)	3.0 (7.6)	1.2 (3.0)	0.0 (0.0)	0.0 (0.0)	0.0 (0.0)	0.0 (0.0)	0.0 (0.0)	0.0 (0.0)	0.0 (0.0)	0.3 (0.76)	2.4 (6.1)	9.5 (24)
Average precipitation days (≥ 0.01 in)	7.2	6.8	9.2	10.7	12.5	10.1	8.9	8.2	7.9	8.7	7.6	6.8	104.6
Average snowy days (≥ 0.1 in)	1.7	1.8	0.6	0.1	0.0	0.0	0.0	0.0	0.0	0.1	0.3	1.4	6.0
Source: NOAA

== Demographics ==
Historical population
Census	Pop.	Note	%±
1870	1,064		—
1880	2,162		103.2%
1890	2,812		30.1%
1900	3,158		12.3%
1910	2,894		−8.4%
1920	2,702		−6.6%
1930	2,706		0.1%
1940	2,958		9.3%
1950	3,333		12.7%
1960	3,791		13.7%
1970	3,984		5.1%
1980	4,107		3.1%
1990	4,099		−0.2%
2000	4,209		2.7%
2010	4,219		0.2%
2020	4,220		0.0%
U.S. Decennial Census

Butler is considered a part of the Kansas City metropolitan area.

=== 2020 census ===
As of the 2020 census, Butler had a population of 4,220. The median age was 38.4 years. 23.9% of residents were under the age of 18 and 20.7% of residents were 65 years of age or older. For every 100 females there were 97.5 males, and for every 100 females age 18 and over there were 92.6 males age 18 and over.

0.0% of residents lived in urban areas, while 100.0% lived in rural areas.

There were 1,685 households in Butler, of which 30.4% had children under the age of 18 living in them. Of all households, 38.9% were married-couple households, 18.3% were households with a male householder and no spouse or partner present, and 33.4% were households with a female householder and no spouse or partner present. About 36.6% of all households were made up of individuals and 19.1% had someone living alone who was 65 years of age or older.

There were 1,908 housing units, of which 11.7% were vacant. The homeowner vacancy rate was 6.1% and the rental vacancy rate was 9.8%.

Racial composition as of the 2020 census
Race	Number	Percent
White	3,789	89.8%
Black or African American	101	2.4%
American Indian and Alaska Native	32	0.8%
Asian	18	0.4%
Native Hawaiian and Other Pacific Islander	2	0.0%
Some other race	62	1.5%
Two or more races	216	5.1%
Hispanic or Latino (of any race)	158	3.7%

=== 2010 census ===
As of the census of 2010, there were 4,219 people, 1,739 households, and 1,031 families living in the city. The population density was 1,036.6 inhabitants per square mile (400.2/km^{2}). There were 2,047 housing units at an average density of 502.9 per square mile (194.2/km^{2}). The racial makeup of the city was 94.5% White, 2.7% African American, 0.5% Native American, 0.2% Asian, 0.5% from other races, and 1.7% from two or more races. Hispanic or Latino of any race were 2.3% of the population.

There were 1,739 households, of which 29.7% had children under the age of 18 living with them, 42.8% were married couples living together, 12.2% had a female householder with no husband present, 4.3% had a male householder with no wife present, and 40.7% were non-families. Of all households, 35.5% were made up of individuals, and 17.6% had someone living alone who was 65 years of age or older. The average household size was 2.30 and the average family size was 2.97.

The median age in the city was 39.3 years. 24.1% of residents were under the age of 18; 7.9% were between the ages of 18 and 24; 23.2% were from 25 to 44; 23.6% were from 45 to 64; and 20.9% were 65 years of age or older. The gender makeup of the city was 46.8% male and 53.2% female.

=== 2000 census ===
As of the census of 2000, there were 4,209 people, 1,723 households, and 1,047 families living in the city. The population density was 1,089.5 inhabitants per square mile (420.7/km^{2}). There were 1,914 housing units at an average density of 495.4 per square mile (191.3/km^{2}). The racial makeup of the city was 95.65% White, 1.92% African American, 0.43% Native American, 0.38% Asian, 0.02% Pacific Islander, 0.55% from other races, and 1.05% from two or more races. Hispanic or Latino of any race were 0.97% of the population.

There were 1,723 households, out of which 29.2% had children under the age of 18 living with them, 46.3% were married couples living together, 10.4% had a female householder with no husband present, and 39.2% were non-families. Of all households, 35.2% were made up of individuals, and 21.1% had someone living alone who was 65 years of age or older. The average household size was 2.32 and the average family size was 2.97.

In the city the population was spread out, with 25.0% under the age of 18, 8.8% from 18 to 24, 23.4% from 25 to 44, 19.1% from 45 to 64, and 23.7% who were 65 years of age or older. The median age was 39 years. For every 100 females, there were 82.8 males. For every 100 females age 18 and over, there were 77.3 males.

The median income for a household in the city was $25,531, and the median income for a family was $31,596. Males had a median income of $27,917 versus $18,523 for females. The per capita income for the city was $15,237. About 15.4% of families and 19.4% of the population were below the poverty line, including 24.3% of those under age 18 and 18.3% of those age 65 or over.

== Education ==
Butler R-V School District operates one elementary school and Butler High School. The elementary school serves children from kindergarten to 5th grade, and the high school oversees grades 6 to 12.

The town has a lending library, the Butler Public Library.

== Notable people ==
- Wesley Bolin, Arizona governor
- Harvey C. Clark, U.S. Army brigadier general
- Robert A. Heinlein, science fiction author; was born and lived in Butler.
- Charles O'Rear, photographer and author; was born in Butler.
- Randy Pike, Missouri state legislator; was born in Butler.
- Stan Wall, former Major League Baseball pitcher for the Los Angeles Dodgers.
- Warren Dee Welliver, lawyer and jurist. Served ten years on the Supreme Court of Missouri.
