= Battle of Cabin Creek =

Battle of Cabin Creek may refer to two battles during the American Civil War occurring in present-day Mayes County, Oklahoma:

- First Battle of Cabin Creek, July 1–2, 1863
- Second Battle of Cabin Creek, September 19, 1864

== See also ==
- Cabin Creek battlefield, an eastern Oklahoma park which encompasses much of the land upon which the two engagements occurred
- Cabin Creek (disambiguation)
