= Battle of Island Mound State Historic Site =

Historic battlefield in Missouri, United States

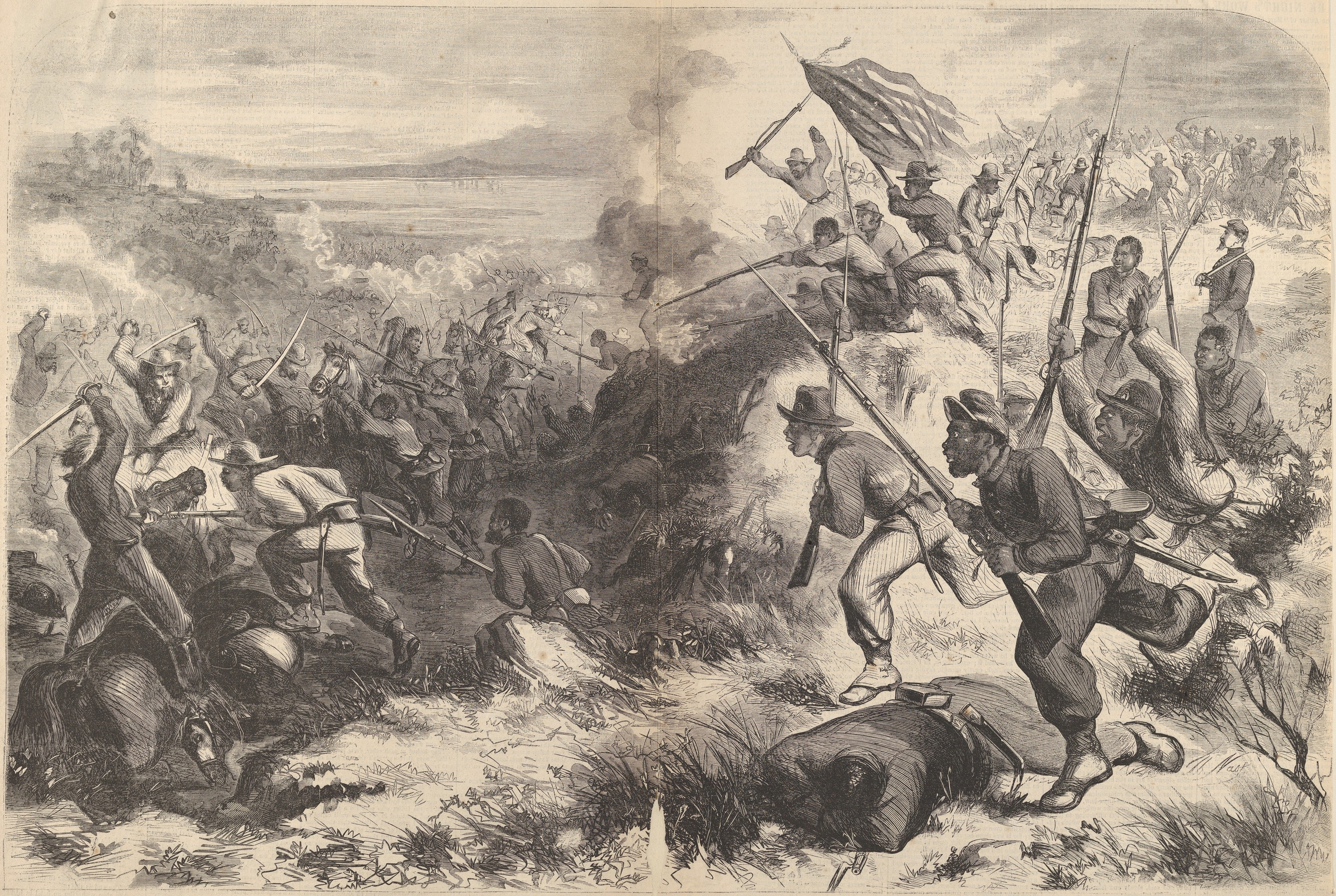

- Location within Missouri Location within the United States
- Location: Bates County, Missouri, United States
- Coordinates: 38°14′07.2708″N 94°26′23.6436″W
- Area: 40 acres (16 ha)
- Established: 2008
- Visitors: 19,781 (in 2022)
- Governing body: Missouri Department of Natural Resources
- Website: Battle of Island Mound; State Historic Site

The Battle of Island Mound State Historic Site is located in a rural area of Bates County, Missouri, in the western part of the state. The site was established to preserve the area of the American Civil War battle that took place in October 28–29, 1862 between Union forces and Confederate guerrillas. The battle was significant as the first time African-American troops on the Union side engaged enemy white troops in the Civil War. A correspondent of The New York Times reported on the battle; the headline noted the "desperate bravery" of the African Americans in achieving Union victory.

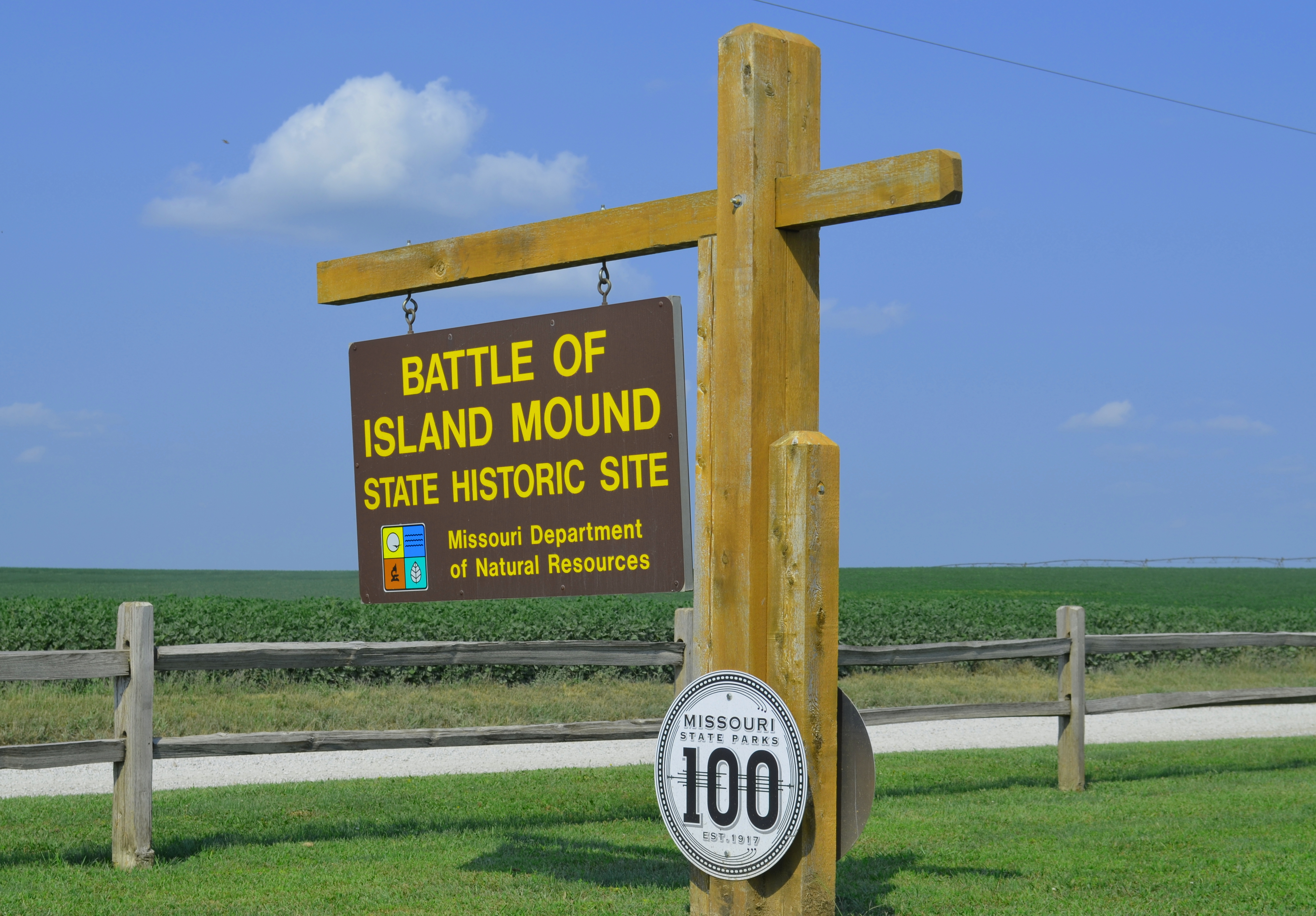
Signage at the entrance to Battle of Island Mound (Missouri) State Historic Site.

This area was active with guerrillas and raiding parties from either side. In this conflict, the Union forces were mainly the 1st Regiment Kansas Volunteer Infantry (Colored) with supporting elements of the 5th Regiment Kansas Volunteer Cavalry; they opposed a much larger, mounted force of Confederate guerrillas, who were supplemented with elements of the pro-Confederate Missouri State Guard.

== The site ==
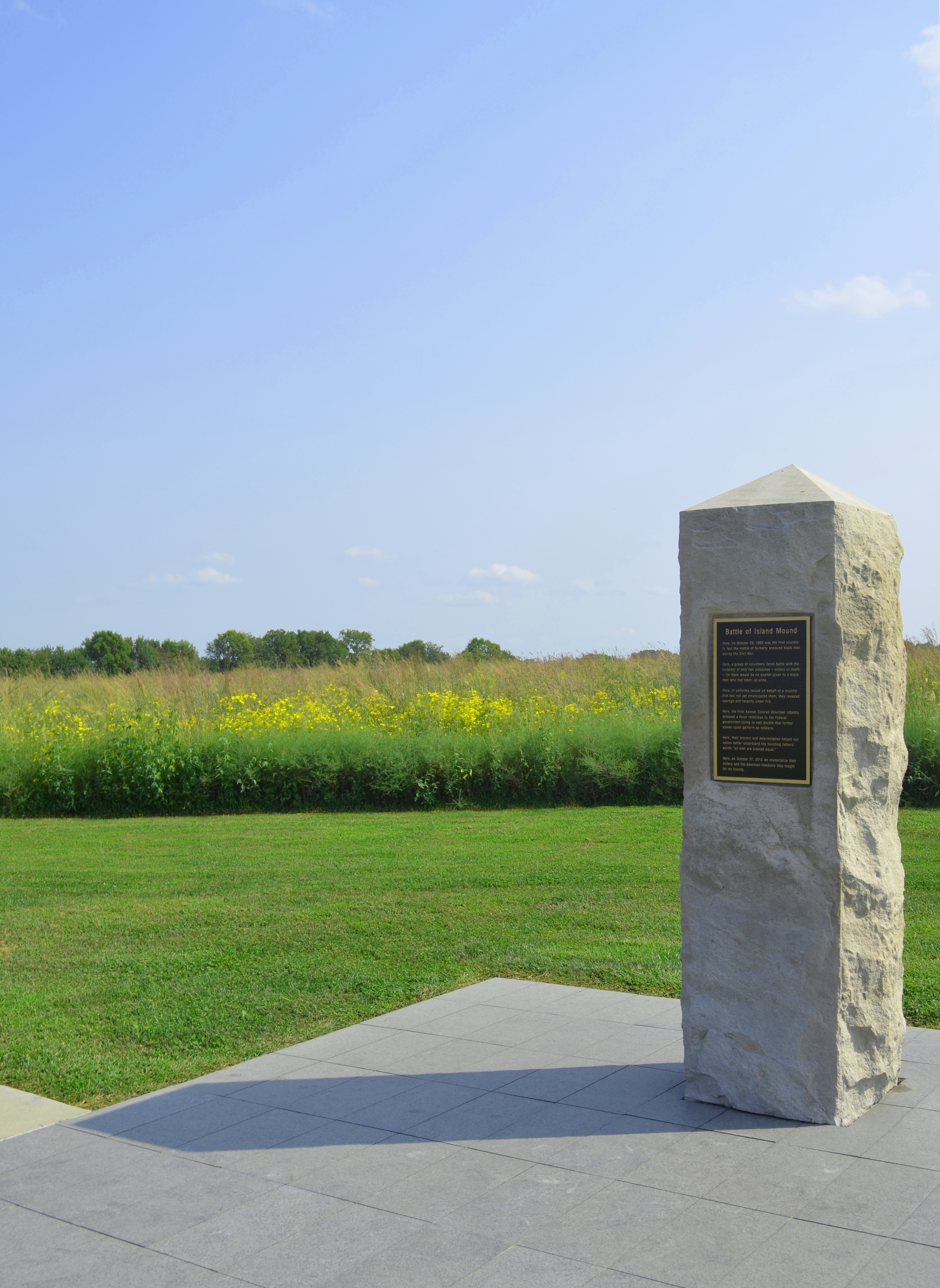
A marker at the Battle of Island Mound State Historic Site. Its plaque reads (quoting): Here, on October 29, 1862 was the first crucible to test the mettle of formerly enslaved black men during the Civil War.Here, a group of volunteers faced battle with the certainty of only two outcomes -- victory or death -- for there would be no quarter given to a black man who had taken up arms.Here, in uniforms issued on behalf of a country that had not yet emancipated them, they revealed courage and tenacity under fire. Here, the First Kansas Colored Volunteer Infantry defeated a force rebellious to the Federal government laying to rest doubts that former slaves could perform as soldiers. Here, their bravery and determination helped our nation better understand the founding fathers' words "all men are created equal."Here, on October 27, 2012 we memorialize their victory and the American freedoms they fought for so bravely.

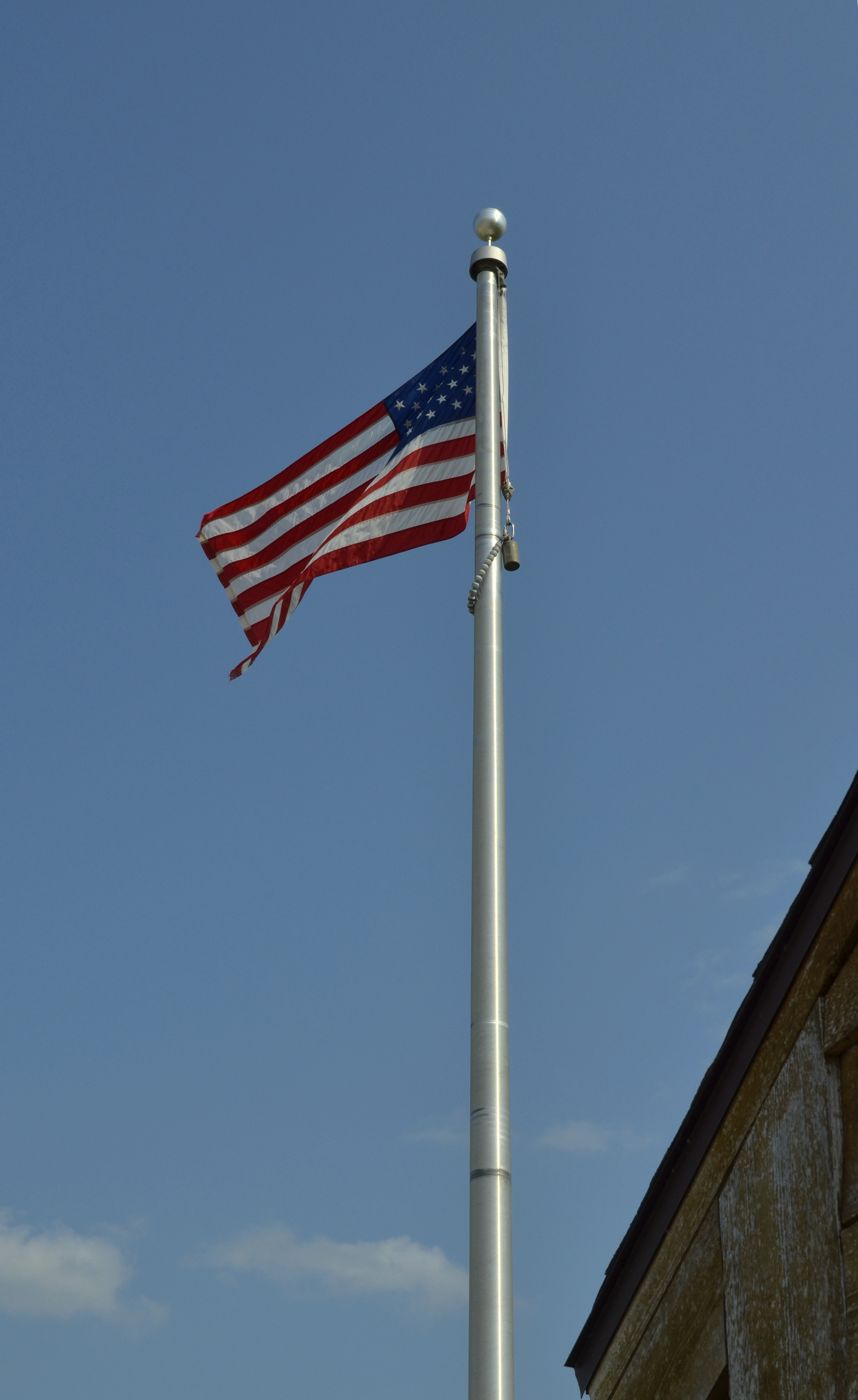
The American Flag flies over the viewing station

The historic site is located approximately eight miles southwest of Butler, Missouri, a short distance off State Highway K. The 40-acre site is near the battle location, which is located on private property one-half mile to the south. It encompasses much of the Toothman homestead, which was commandeered by the Union troops, fortified with temporary breastworks and christened "Fort Africa." It is believed to include the graves of the eight Union men who died in the battle, although their remains have not yet been located.

Although the battle was covered by a correspondent of The New York Times, who praised the "desperate bravery" of the black soldiers, the site and the battle were largely forgotten in the post-bellum period. Much historical research since the late 20th century has documented and interpreted African-American history. In addition, with the approach of the American Civil War sesquicentennial, interest was rekindled. The state of Missouri acquired the land in 2008 in order to preserve as much of this notable site as possible. Dedication ceremonies were held for the site on October 26–27, 2012, nearly 150 years to the day of the battle.

In May 2013, the site was accepted into the National Park Service's "National Underground Railroad Network to Freedom," a series of locations deemed to be significant to African-American history in their struggle for freedom, including the Underground Railroad.

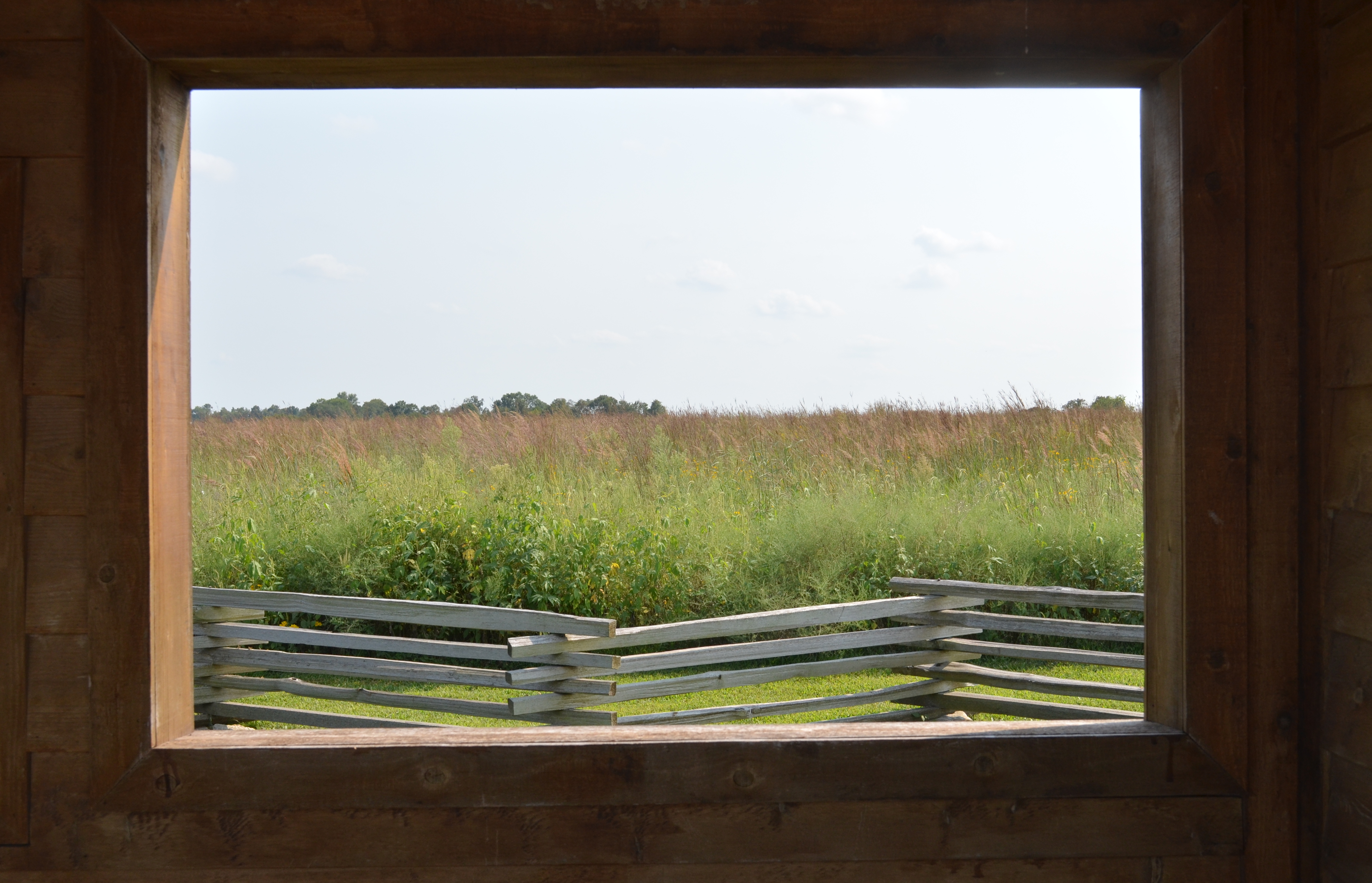
The central attraction of the Battle of Island Mound State Historic Site is its viewing station, which contains several informational signs and offers this framed view of the site and a split rail fence.

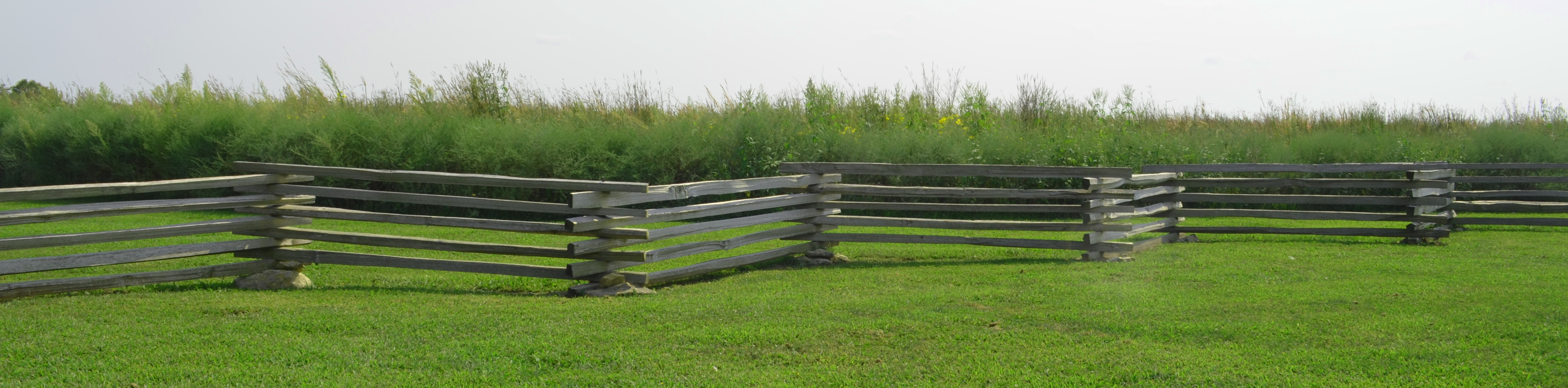
The site of much of the fighting at Island Mound is now covered in prairie foliage, as was about three-quarters of Bates County in the mid 19th Century. A split rail fence, also typical of the period, sets off the prairie from the viewing station.

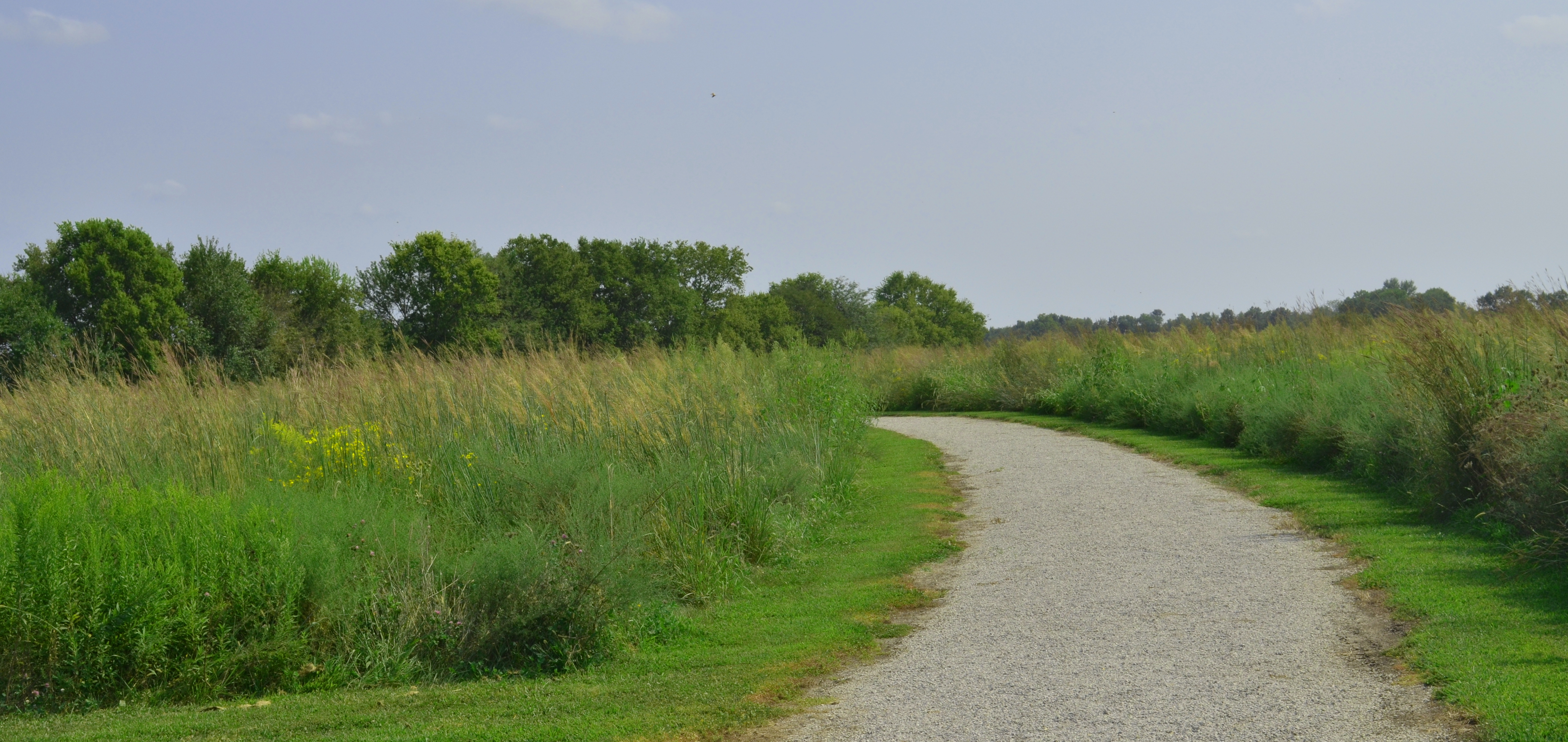
A .6-mile walking path, the "Courage Trail," winds through the prairie flowers and grass at the Battle of Island Mound State Historic Site. During the battle, the southern force set fire to the prairie in an attempt to burn their opponents out, and the union force lit a back fire to protect itself. In the confusion that followed, much of the fighting was at extremely close quarters.

== The battle ==
During the Battle of Island Mound (aka "Battle of Fort Toothman" or "Fort Africa") on October 28–29, 1862, the Union 1st Kansas Colored Volunteers—composed of former Arkansas and Missouri slaves—and a scouting team of Cherokee and blacks from the 5th Kansas Volunteer Cavalry engaged a numerically superior force of Confederate guerrillas and recent Missouri State Guard recruits led by Vard Cockrell and Bill Truman (who was related to future President Harry S. Truman). The Union forces had crossed into Missouri on a mission to clear Confederate guerrillas from their base known as "Hog Island" in the Osage River.

Finding themselves outnumbered in an early sortie, the Union troops commandeered and fortified the homestead of Confederate guerrilla Enoch John Toothman, and a one-day siege ensued. Part of the regiment was caught out on the tall-grass prairie by mounted Confederate guerrillas. They stood their ground through several volleys of gunfire and a cavalry charge, before the Confederates withdrew from the area on October 29. Union casualties were relatively light: Union losses were seven enlisted men (six African Americans: Corp. Joseph Talbot, Privates Samuel Davis, Thomas Lane, Marlon Barber, Allen Rhodes, Henry Gash, all of Co F; Cherokee John Six-Killer of Seaman's Battalion) and Captain A.G. Crew of Co. A. Confederate losses are estimated at more than thirty.

The clash was significant as the first time African-American troops engaged Confederate forces during the Civil War. It was covered by a correspondent of The New York Times who was with the regiment, and he praised the men's "desperate bravery." He also noted that Bill Truman had told men in Butler that the blacks had fought "like tigers." The battle was also covered by Harper's Weekly. Such positive reports provided encouragement to other African-American units that were forming across the northern states and petitioning the Union government to fight in combat. The United States Colored Troops were established, contributing critical fighting and support to the Union effort.

== Activities and amenities ==
The site offers hiking and picnic opportunities as a day-use facility, open from sunrise to sunset. A central kiosk provides information about the battle. It is adjacent to a .6 mile looping trail where the "Courage Monument" and interpretive panels are found. A picnic shelter that can accommodate up to fifty, toilet facilities, and drinking fountain are located near the kiosk.

== See also ==
- Military history of African Americans in the American Civil War
