= Cabin Creek =

Cabin Creek may refer to the following places in the United States:

== Streams ==
- Cabin Creek (Appomattox River), Virginia
- Cabin Creek (Montana)
- Cabin Creek (South Dakota)
- Cabin Creek (West Virginia)
- Cabin Creek, Indiana — both a creek and the location of an erstwhile farming settlement along the creek

== Other places ==
- Cabin Creek, Colorado, an unincorporated community
- Cabin Creek, West Virginia, an unincorporated community
- Cabin Creek Historic District, a historic settlement in Kittitas County, Washington
- Cabin Creek Ranger Residence and Dormitory, historic buildings in Sequoia National Park, California
- Cabin Creek USFS Airport, an airport in Valley County, Idaho

== Other uses ==
- Battle of Cabin Creek (disambiguation)
