= James Monroe Williams =

American lawyer, soldier and merchant (1833–1907)

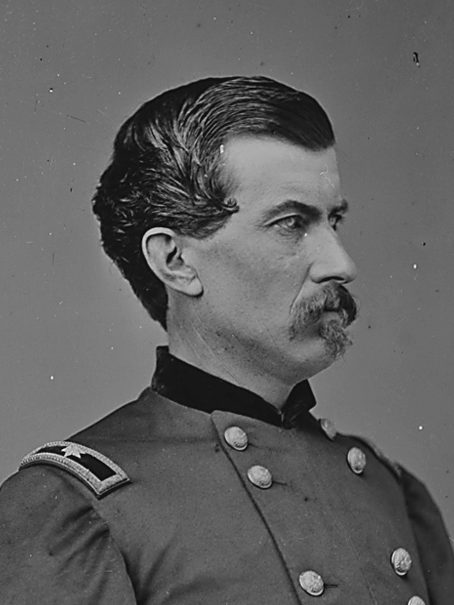
- Born: September 12, 1833; Lowville, New York, U.S.
- Died: February 15, 1907 (aged 73); Washington, D.C., U.S.
- Burial place: Arlington National Cemetery
- Military career
- Allegiance: United States
- Branch: United States Army
- Service years: 1861–1865; 1866–1873; 1891
- Rank: Colonel; Brevet Brigadier General
- Commands: 1st Kansas Colored Infantry Regiment; 79th United States Colored Infantry Regiment
- Conflicts: American Civil War; Skirmish at Island Mound; Battle of Honey Springs; Battle of Poison Springs
- Other work: Lawyer; rancher; merchant

James Monroe Williams (September 12, 1833 – February 15, 1907) was an American lawyer, soldier, and merchant. He served both as a cavalry and as an infantry officer in the Union Army within the Trans-Mississippi Theater during the American Civil War, and was breveted a brigadier general near the end of the conflict.

Williams also helped organize and was the initial commander of the 1st Kansas Colored Infantry Regiment, the first unit of USCT soldiers to see combat. Following the war, Williams remained a soldier until resigning in 1871 to become a rancher, then re-entered the service briefly about twenty years later, and afterwards became a merchant.

== Early life ==
James M. Williams was born in 1833 in Lowville, New York, and later became a lawyer in that state.

== Civil War service ==
On July 12, 1861, Williams entered the Union Army as a captain in the 5th Kansas Cavalry Regiment, and was appointed commander of Company F. The unit was organized at Leavenworth, Kansas, beginning that summer and into January of the following year. Williams and his regiment served in the Department of Kansas through June 1862, and then with the Department of Missouri that July.

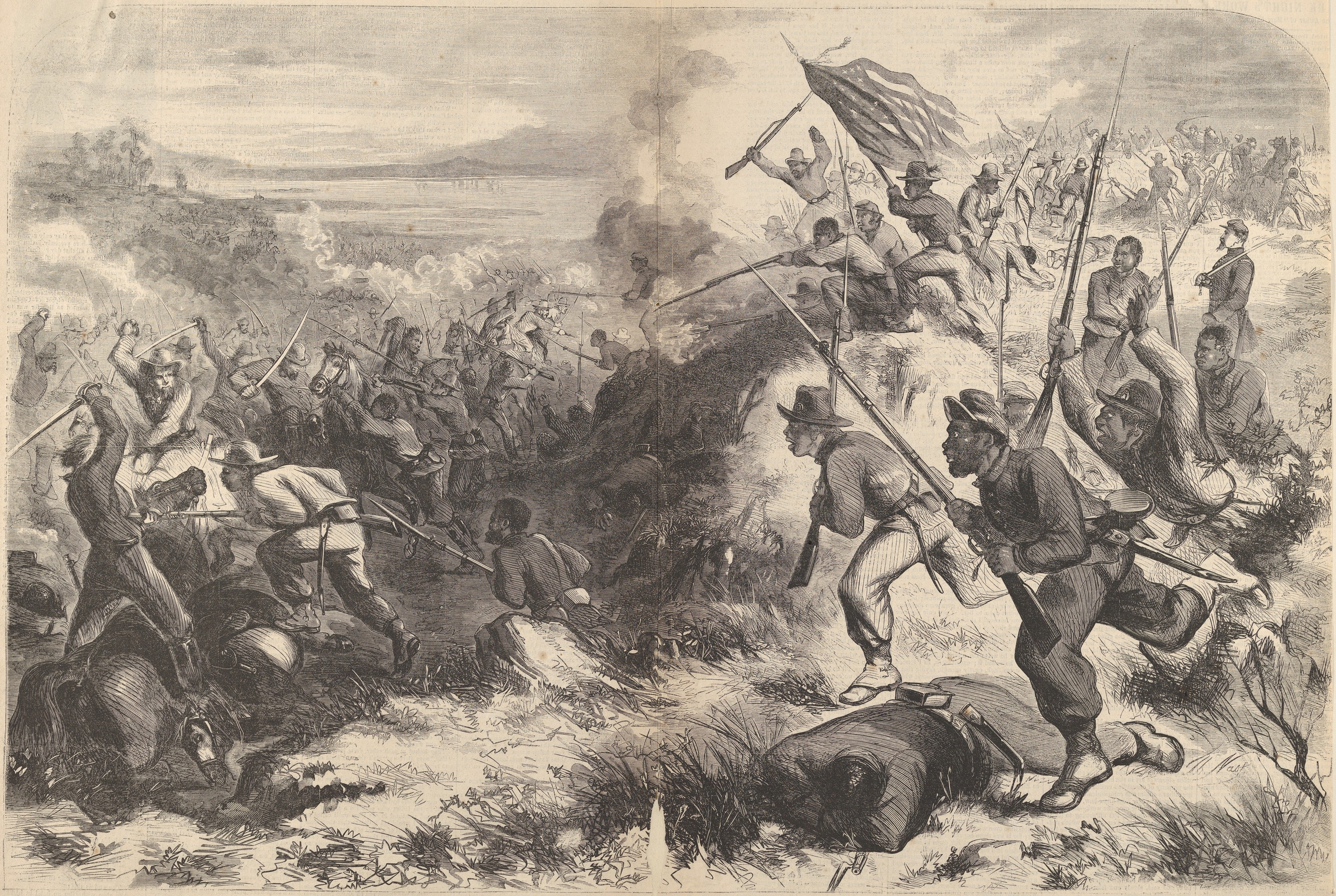
Battle of Island Mound originally published by Harper's magazine on March 14, 1863

Williams resigned from the 5th Kansas Cavalry in the fall of 1862 to help organize and train the 1st Kansas Colored Infantry Regiment. The unit was raised that August at Fort Scott, Kansas, and he appointed its commander as a state militia colonel. He led his regiment into battle on October 29 during the Skirmish at Island Mound in Bates County, Missouri, the first instance of Union Army colored soldiers in action. He was commissioned a Union Army lieutenant colonel on January 13, 1863, when his regiment was federalized as the 79th Regiment Infantry U.S. Colored Troops. On May 2 Williams was promoted to the rank of colonel, and on July 1–2 he fought at the Battle of Cabin Creek in the Indian Territory. About two weeks later he led his regiment during the Battle of Honey Springs, and Williams was wounded in this fight.

In December 1863 Williams was assigned command of Roseville, Arkansas, in the District of the Frontier, Department of the Missouri, and he participated in the Camden Expedition in southern and central Arkansas from March 23 to May 2, 1864. He then exercised brigade command at various times in the District of the Frontier and in the VII Corps for the remainder of 1864 through the fall of 1865. Williams also fought at the Battle of Fort Smith in western Arkansas on July 31, 1864.

== Postbellum ==
On October 1, 1865, Williams was mustered out of the volunteer service. He was commissioned a captain in the new 8th U.S. Cavalry Regiment of the regular army on July 28, 1866, commanding Company I. The 8th Cavalry was at first based out of Fort Whipple in the Arizona Territory, but later stationed at Fort Selden and Fort Bayard, both in the New Mexico Territory. Williams was brevetted a major on July 9, 1867, for his service during the Indian Wars. He resigned his commission on March 29, 1873, and took up work in the Colorado Territory as a rancher.

Williams re-entered the army nearly two decades later, joining the 7th U.S. Cavalry Regiment as a captain on January 7, 1891, and retired five days later to become a merchant.

== Death and burial ==
Williams died in Washington, D.C., on February 15, 1907, and was buried with full military honors in Arlington National Cemetery in Virginia.

== See also ==
- List of American Civil War brevet generals (Union)
