= Randy Pike =

American politician (1953–2014)

Member of the Missouri House of Representatives from the 126th district
- In office 2013–2014
- Succeeded by: Patricia Pike

Personal details
- Born: Randall W. Pike; September 30, 1953 Butler, Missouri, U.S.
- Died: September 20, 2014 (aged 60) Butler, Missouri, U.S.
- Party: Republican
- Spouse: Patricia
- Children: 2
- Profession: Taxidermist; woodcarver

Randall W. Pike (September 30, 1953 – September 20, 2014) was an American politician.

Born in Butler, Missouri, Pike graduated from Butler High School in 1972 and then went to Central Missouri State University. Pike was a taxidermist and woodcarver. He was elected Bates County Northern Commissioner and served from 2002 to 2012. Pike then served in the Missouri House of Representatives, as a Republican, from Adrian, Missouri, from 2013 until his death in 2014 in Butler, ten days before his 61st birthday.
