= Skirmish at Island Mound =

Battle of the American Civil War

Coordinates: 38.26°N 94.34°W

- Part of the trans-Mississippi Theater of the American Civil War
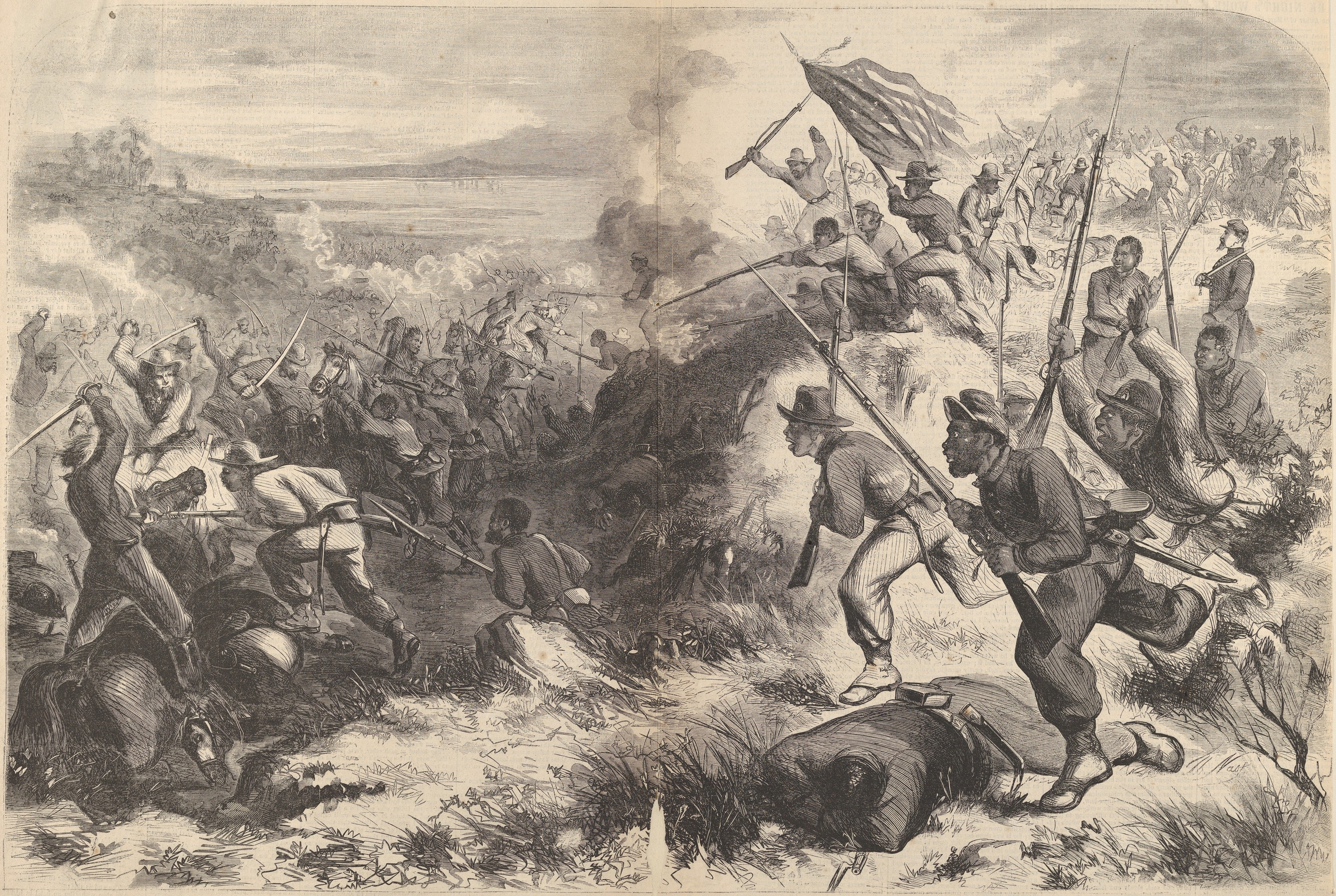
- A woodcut depicting the battle published in Harper's Weekly in 1863
Date	October 29, 1862
Location	Bates County, Missouri
Result	Union victory

Belligerents
United States	Confederate States

Commanders and leaders
Richard G. Ward; Henry C. Seaman	Jeremiah V. Cockrell; Dick Hancock; Bill Truman

Units involved
1st Regiment Kansas Volunteer Infantry (Colored)	Missouri State Guard

Strength
250	~350

Casualties and losses
8 killed 11 wounded	Estimated 30–40 killed, unknown wounded

The Skirmish at Island Mound was a skirmish of the American Civil War, occurring on October 29, 1862, in Bates County, Missouri. The Union victory is notable as the first known event in which an African-American regiment engaged in combat against Confederate forces during the war.

Made up mostly of former slaves who had escaped from Missouri and Arkansas, the regiment was recently trained in Kansas. They were outnumbered in the skirmish, but stood their ground and fought with "desperate bravery," as headlined by The New York Times. This Kansas regiment was later made part of the Union Army as United States Colored Troops. The state acquired property here in 2011 and the area has been preserved since 2012 as the Battle of Island Mound State Historic Site.

== Background ==
Captain (soon to be Colonel) James M. Williams had been forming an African-American regiment in Kansas, made up largely of escaped slaves from Missouri, Arkansas, and Indian Territory, and some free blacks. In August 1862, these men were mustered into Kansas militia service as the 1st Kansas Colored Volunteers. The United States was not yet ready to accept black troops in the Union Army. They weren't mustered into United States service until January 13, 1863, after the Emancipation Proclamation. Despite the uncertainty of the regiment's future as a federal military force, Kansas ensured the men were armed with a mix of good Austrian and Prussian muskets with bayonets.

Maj. B.S. Henning ordered Captain Richard G. Ward's 170-man battalion and Captain Henry C. Seaman's 70-man battalion to proceed across the Missouri River to Bates County, Missouri. They were accompanied by members of the 5th Kansas Cavalry serving as scouts, among them some Cherokee and blacks. The objective was to break up a guerrilla army based on Hog Island in the Osage River, near the Toothman homestead and about nine miles on the other side of the Kansas-Missouri border. The area away from the river was largely open tall-grass prairie and farms, without many trees. John Toothman had been identified as a guerrilla and imprisoned at Fort Lincoln, a Civil War prison camp near Fulton, Kansas.

As the Kansans approached on Monday, October 27, the scouts identified a large party ahead as local Confederate guerrillas under Bill Truman and Dick Hancock, as well as Missouri State Guard recruits under Colonel Jeremiah "Vard" Cockrell (all mounted.)

== Siege and Engagement ==
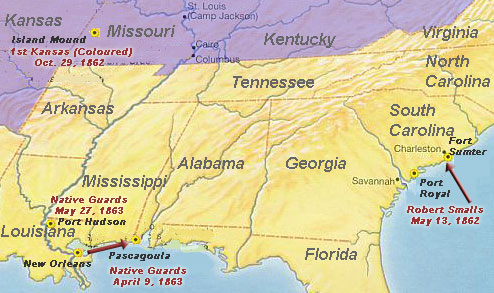
Map of early African-American involvement in the Civil War, including the Skirmish at Island Mound

Finding the enemy in greater force than anticipated, the Kansans fortified the Toothman homestead and used fence rails to create breastworks. The soldiers dubbed the works, "Fort Africa." Tuesday passed with occasional skirmishing. The superior range of the Austrian muskets kept the guerrilla cavalry, with lesser arms, at bay.

By Wednesday, October 29, the Kansans' rations were running low. Runners had been sent back to Kansas requesting assistance. A foraging party was dispatched while skirmishers pushed forward to create a diversion. When the foragers returned, the men ate.

While the Kansans ate, the guerrillas set a prairie fire south of the camp, driving in the skirmishers. Seaman responded by back burning to prevent the fire from reaching the camp. He sent out a scouting party, consisting of Cherokee John Six-Killer and his slaves, who had enlisted with him. The party was to move beyond the edge of the fire, but remain in sight of the camp. Instead, they were drawn into skirmishing and advanced out of sight. A party under Lieutenant Joseph Gardner (soon accompanied by several other officers) was dispatched to their aid and to recall them. This group also soon became engaged out of sight.

Captain Ward was dispatched to their aid and could soon see the others engaged far from camp in the river bottoms. He called for the rest of the command to be brought up. In response Seaman sent his force forward on the flanks in support.

The mounted guerrillas appeared in force, moving to a point between Gardner and Ward. Gardner's men attempted to make it back to camp. When they could not, they formed a line and fired a volley into the charging cavalry. The Kansas men were badly outnumbered. A general melee ensued, in which most of the Kansans losses occurred. Southern cavalry who swept past Gardner found themselves hemmed in by volleys from the rest of the approaching Kansans. Gardner's detachment moved toward the advancing line, and the guerrillas were finally forced to withdraw.

== Casualties and significance ==
Union casualties were 8 killed (1 white officer, 6 black, 1 Cherokee) and 11 men wounded. Among the dead were Captain A.G. Crew of Co. A.; Corp. Joseph Talbot, Privates Samuel Davis, Thomas Lane, Marlon Barber, Allen Rhodes, Henry Gash, all of Co F; and John Six-Killer of Seaman's Battalion. Guerrilla losses are unknown, although some Kansans at the time claimed up to 40 killed.

The action was reported in The New York Times by a correspondent who had accompanied the Kansas unit. The heroic action of the African Americans was headlined as "desperate bravery;" and Bill Truman told supporters in Butler that the blacks had fought "like tigers." The African Americans were fighting for their freedom, to ensure they never went back to slavery, and they knew the guerrillas would give them no quarter, having promised to kill blacks rather than take them prisoner.

The unit's bravery attracted national attention, as some observers had doubted whether former slaves would make good soldiers. In 1863 the United States Colored Troops were established. On December 13, 1864, the 1st Kansas Colored Volunteers were redesignated as the 79th United States Colored Troops.

== Legacy and honors ==
- The Battle of Island Mound State Historic Site was established in 2012 in Bates County to preserve this area. It memorializes the actions of all the soldiers, including the eight Kansas soldiers who died in action and were buried near the Toothman farm.

== Representation in other media ==
- The Battle of Island Mound (2014), a 30-minute documentary, was commissioned by the Missouri Department of Natural Resources and produced by Brant Hadfield, a filmmaker based in St. Louis. He wrote, directed, shot and edited the film. It won two Emmy Awards in 2015 for Best Historical Documentary and cinematography. It has won other awards.
