= Palace Hotel (Butler, Missouri) =

- U.S. National Register of Historic Places
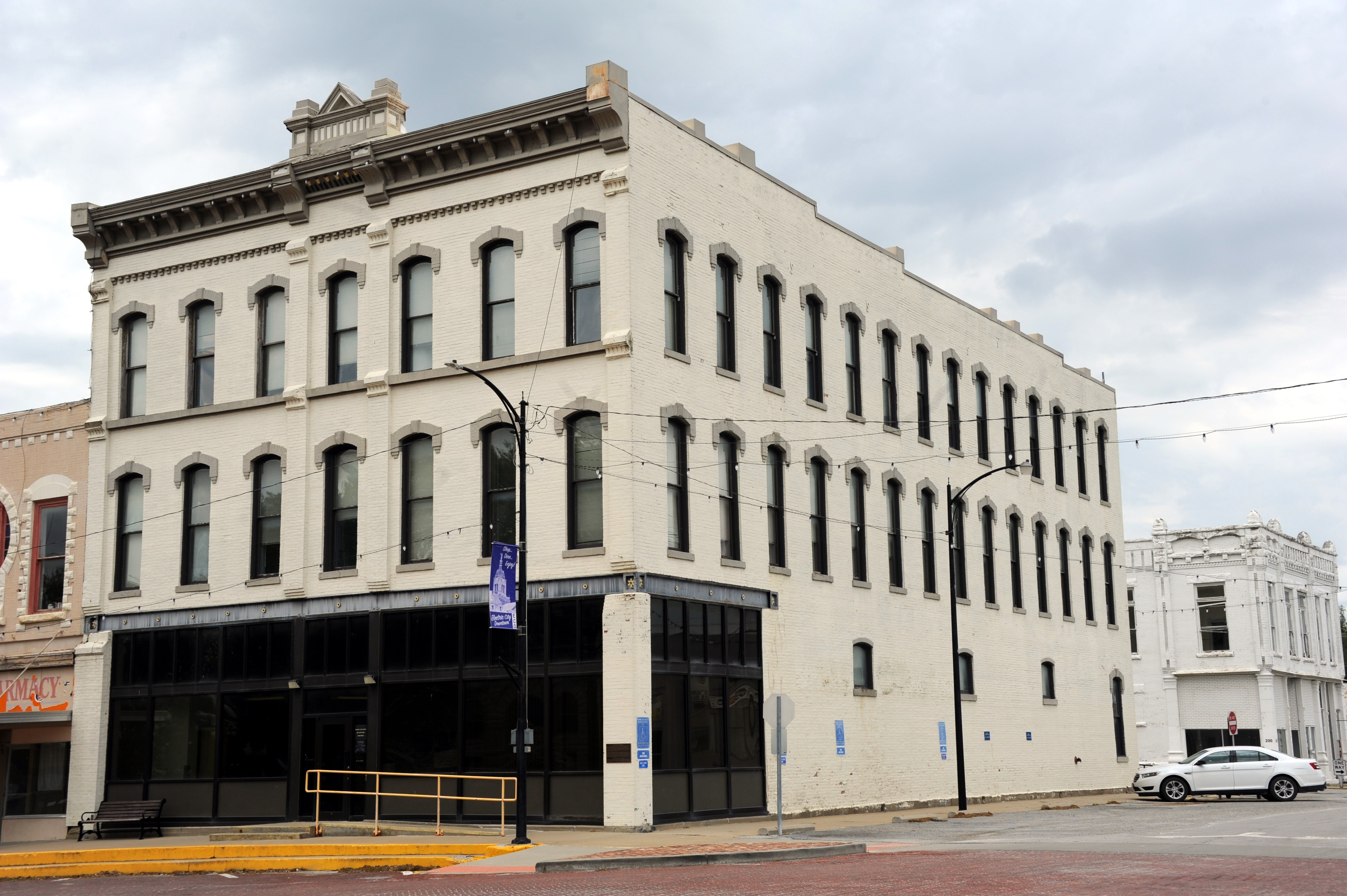

- Location within Missouri Location within the United States
- Location: 2-4 W. Ohio St. Butler, Missouri
- Coordinates: 38°15′31″N 94°19′54″W
- Area: Less than 1 acre (0.40 ha)
- Built: 1879
- Architect: Hannah, Capt. John Westley; Shaw, T.A.
- Architectural style: Italianate
- NRHP reference No.: 02000795
- Added to NRHP: July 19, 2002

Palace Hotel, also known as M.S. Cowles & Co., American Clothing House, Ross Hotel, and J.C. Penney Co., is a historic hotel and commercial building located at Butler, Bates County, Missouri. It was built in 1879, and is a three-story, rectangular, Italianate style wood-frame building faced in brick. It features a highly ornamented front facade, including elaborated window crowns in an inverted-U shape.

It was listed on the National Register of Historic Places in 2002.
