= Patricia Pike =

American politician

Member of the Missouri House of Representatives from the 126th district
- In office 2015–2023
- Preceded by: Randy Pike
- Succeeded by: Jim Kalberloh (redistricting)

Personal details
- Born: October 24, 1954 (age 71)
- Party: Republican
- Spouse: Randy (d. 2014)
- Children: 2
- Profession: farmer, businesswoman

Patricia Pike (born October 24, 1954) is an American politician. She is a former member of the Missouri House of Representatives, serving from 2015 to 2023. She is a member of the Republican party. Also, she owns a business and a farm.
