= First Battle of Cabin Creek =

Battle of the American Civil War

Coordinates: 36.488990°N 95.121603°W

- Part of the Trans-Mississippi Theater of the American Civil War
Date	July 1–2, 1863
Location	Mayes County, Oklahoma
Result	Union victory

Belligerents
United States of America (Union)	Confederate States of America

Commanders and leaders
James Monroe Williams	Stand Watie

Strength
Detachments from nine units	1,600–1,800

Casualties and losses
3–23 killed, 30 wounded	65 killed

The First Battle of Cabin Creek occurred from July 1 to July 2, 1863, Mayes County, Oklahoma during the American Civil War. Confederate forces, led by Colonel Stand Watie, sought to ambush a Union supply convoy commanded by Colonel James Monroe Williams. However, Williams received advance warning of the attack. Despite the swollen waters of the creek due to rain, Williams launched a successful assault on the entrenched Confederate position, forcing them to retreat. Although a Confederate Army detachment attempted to raid a Union Army supply train bound for Fort Gibson in July 1863, they were unable to impede the Union detachment, which contributed to the Union's victory in the Battle of Honey Springs later that month. Notably, this battle marked the first instance of African American troops fighting alongside their white comrades.

Two Civil War military engagements were fought at the Cabin Creek battlefield in the Cherokee Nation within Indian Territory. (Note: the site lies in present day Craig and Mayes Counties in northeastern Oklahoma.) The location was where the Texas Road (Note: The Texas Road was also known as the Osage Trace, Osage Trail, Immigrant Road and the Military Road.') crossed Cabin Creek, near the present-day town of Big Cabin, Oklahoma. Both the First and the Second Battle of Cabin Creek were launched by the Confederate Army to disrupt Union Army supply trains.

The second engagement, in September, 1864, again a Confederate raid on a Union supply train. During this raid, the Confederates managed to capture mules, wagons, and supplies valued at over a million dollars. However, by this time, such actions had little strategic impact on the outcome of the war. Confederate General Stand Watie led the attackers during both raids.

== Background ==
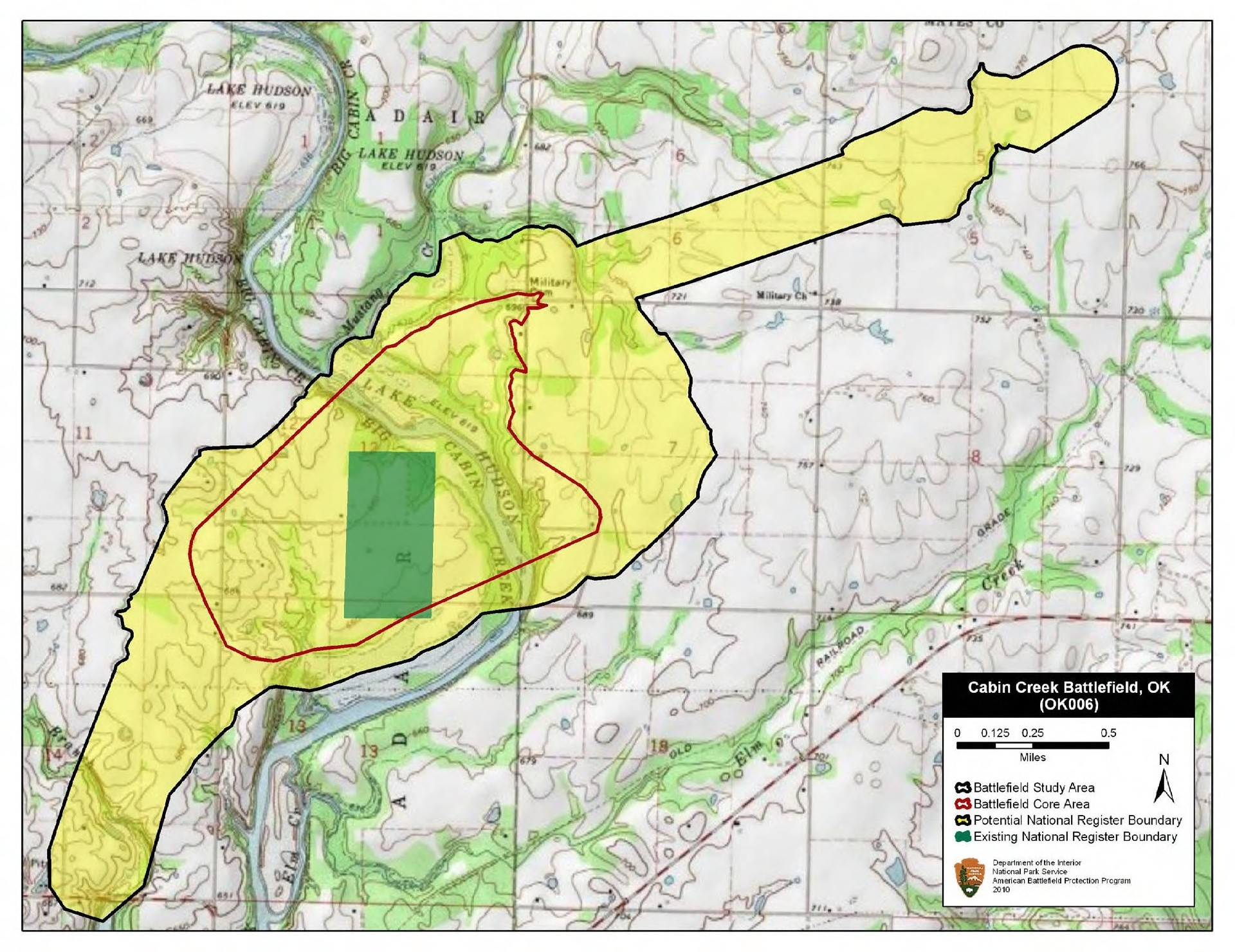
Map of Cabin Creek I Battlefield core and study areas by the American Battlefield Protection Program.

Colonel James M. Williams had charge of the escort of a Union supply train from Fort Scott, Kansas to Fort Gibson, Oklahoma (which was then in Indian Territory). His force marched along the Texas Road and consisted of detachments of the 2nd Colorado Infantry Regiment, 3rd Wisconsin Volunteer Cavalry Regiment, 6th Regiment Kansas Volunteer Cavalry, 9th Regiment Kansas Volunteer Cavalry, 3rd Regiment, Indian Home Guard, 1st Kansas Colored Infantry and the 2nd Kansas Artillery.

Confederate Colonel Stand Watie had intended to ambush Williams' convoy and had 1,600 to 1,800 men lying in wait at the Cabin Creek crossing. Watie had counted on 1,500 additional men, led by Brigadier General William L. Cabell to strengthen his force prior to the attack but Cabell's troops were delayed by high waters on the Grand River.

== Battle ==
Williams arrived at the crossing on 1 July and learned of the intentions of Watie's force from captured Confederate soldiers. Watie's battle line extended around one mile either side of the crossing in trenches dug into the brush lining the creek. Owing to the unusually high water level in the creek, which reached above shoulder height, Williams chose to delay his attack on the Confederates until the following day and corralled his wagons defensively on a nearby prairie.

Williams ordered a half-hour artillery bombardment before launching an assault with the Third Indian Home Guard. They failed to make it across the now waist-deep creek, pushed back by heavy Confederate fire, and so the Ninth Kansas Cavalry were ordered to charge under the covering fire of the 1st Kansas Colored Infantry. With the cavalry having gained a bridgehead across the creek, Williams led the men of his own regiment, the 1st Kansas Colored Infantry, in a headlong charge across the stream and into the brush. This forced the Confederates back and Williams pursued them for a quarter of a mile as they attempted to rally in a clearing. Williams then led his convoy to successfully resupply Fort Gibson. Confederate casualties amounted to 65 men killed with the Union Army suffering between 3 and 23 dead with 30 wounded.

== Impact ==
The action made possible the continuation of a Union force in the Indian territory, allowing the later victories at Honey Springs and Fort Smith. Soon after the battle the Union established defensive outposts along the Texas Road, including one at the Cabin Creek crossing. The battle has the distinction of being the first in which African American soldiers (the 1st Kansas Colored Infantry) fought alongside white troops. A monument to the 1st Kansas Colored Infantry was erected on the battlefield on 7 July 2007.

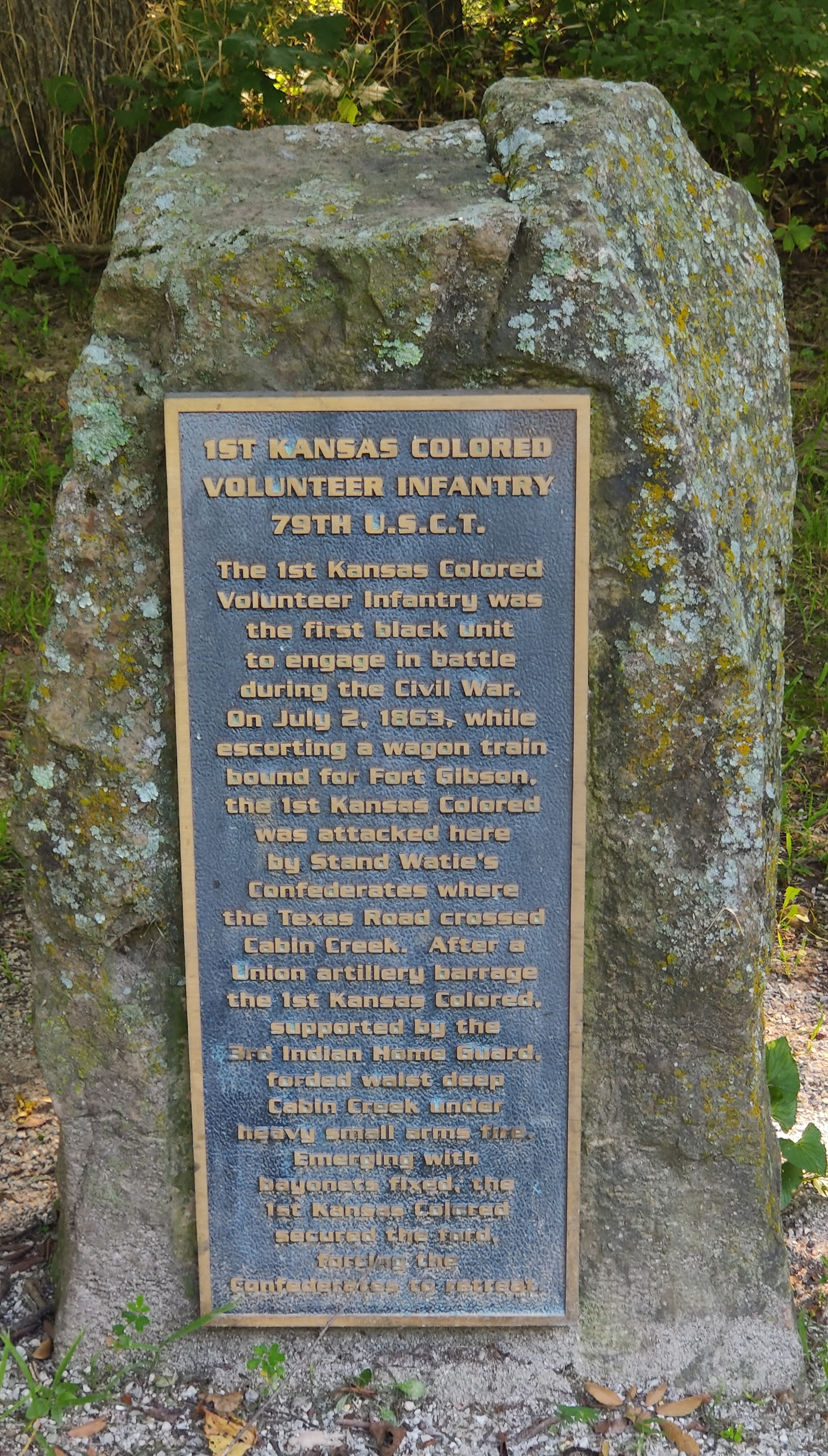
Monument of 1st Kansas Colored Infantry Regiment at Cabin Creek Battle Site, Oklahoma

== Preservation ==
The American Battlefield Trust and its partners have acquired and preserved more than 88 acres of the battlefield as of mid-2023.
