= 1st Kansas Colored Infantry Regiment =

Union army regiment during the American Civil War

1st Kansas Colored Infantry Regiment 79th United States Colored Infantry Regiment
- Active: August 4, 1862 – October 1, 1865
- Country: United States
- Allegiance: Union
- Branch: Infantry; United States Colored Troops
- Size: Regiment
- Equipment: Austrian and Prussian muskets
- Engagements: American Civil War: Skirmish at Island Mound; First Battle of Cabin Creek; Second Battle of Cabin Creek; Battle of Honey Springs; Camden Expedition; Battle of Poison Spring; Battle of Jenkins' Ferry

Commanders
- Notable commanders: James Monroe Williams

The 1st Kansas Colored Infantry Regiment, later renamed the 79th United States Colored Infantry Regiment was a military unit composed of African-American troops recruited from Kansas that served in the Union Army during the American Civil War. It was the first Black regiment organized in a northern state to see combat. At the Battle of Poison Spring, wounded and surrendering soldiers from the regiment were massacred. As a result, the regiment lost nearly half its number and suffered the highest losses of any Kansas regiment during the war.

== Service overview ==
The 1st Kansas Colored Infantry was organized by Senator James Henry Lane at Fort Scott, Kansas and mustered in as a battalion of six companies on January 13, 1863 for three years. Four additional companies were recruited and mustered in between January 13 and May 2, 1863. It mustered in under the command of Colonel James Monroe Williams.

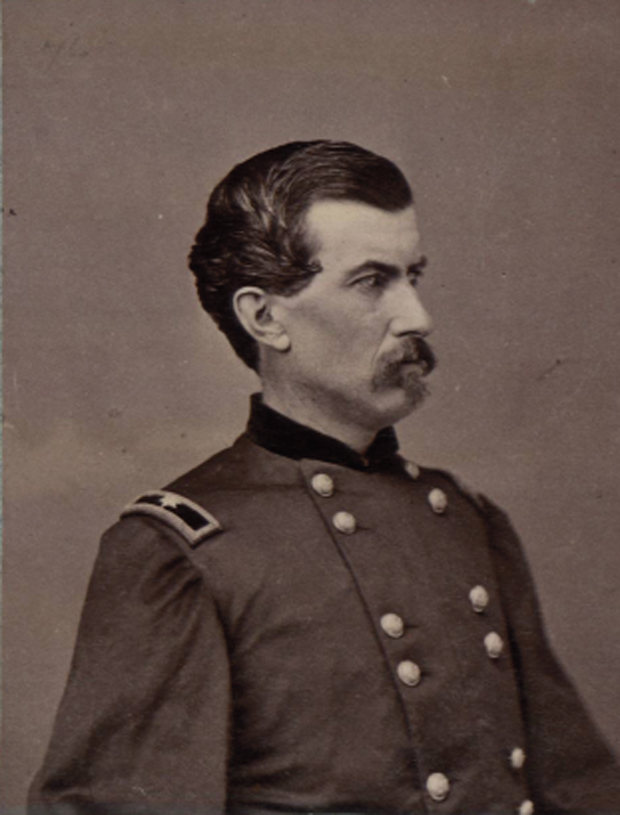
James Monroe Williams, Colonel of 1st Kansas Colored Infantry

The regiment was recruited without federal authorization and against the wishes of Secretary of War Edwin M. Stanton. James H. Lane, recruiting commissioner for Kansan territory north of the Kansas River, on August 4, 1862, authorized raising the regiment. Recruiting officials enlisted black men across eastern Kansas, most of whom were formerly enslaved in Missouri. Some were emancipated, and many had escaped to freedom. It was the first African-American regiment to see combat during the Civil War, in the skirmish at Island Mound, in Bates County, Missouri, in October 1862. The regiment's Company D had three black officers, William D. Matthews and his two lieutenants, Henry Copeland and Patrick Minor, who were not allowed commissions as officers when the regiment was formally mustered into the Union army.

The regiment was attached to Department of Kansas to June 1863.

Maj. Gen. James G. Blunt, commander of the Union forces at the Battle of Honey Springs, was particularly impressed by the performance of the 1st Kansas Colored Infantry at that engagement. They repulsed a Confederate charge, inflicting many casualties, and, after Colonel Williams was badly wounded, continued to fight and made an orderly withdrawal. Afterwards, he wrote: "I never saw such fighting as was done by the Negro regiment....The question that negroes will fight is settled; besides they make better soldiers in every respect than any troops I have ever had under my command."

In April 1864, Union troops including the 1st Kansas were defeated by a Confederate force at the Battle of Poison Spring, Arkansas. Following this battle, a large number of the wounded and captured Black soldiers of the regiment were executed by the Confederates, with some of the Kansas troops scalped by Confederate-allied Choctaws. 117 men of the regiment were killed at Poison Spring, with 65 wounded.

On December 13, 1864, the name of the regiment was changed to the 79th Regiment Infantry U.S. Colored Troops. Under the new name, the regiment continued to serve in Arkansas until October 1865, when it was mustered out of service. Also attached to the regiment at some point was Armstrong's Battery Light Artillery, a unit for which few details are known.

== Commanders ==
Commanding officers of the 1st Kansas/79th Colored Infantry:

- Colonel James Monroe Williams, awarded brevet brigadier general, February 1865.
- Lieutenant Colonel Richard G. Ward
- Lieutenant Colonel John Bowles, discharged from the service, December 1864.

== Commemoration ==
In 2011, quilt artist and educator Marla Jackson worked with junior high students in Lawrence, Kansas to produce a collaborative and commemorative quilt on the 1st Kansas Infantry. The quilt, along with several others by Jackson that evoked similar themes, was displayed at the Spencer Museum of Art.

== See also ==
- List of Kansas Civil War Units
- Skirmish at Island Mound
- Kansas in the Civil War
