= Cabin Creek (South Dakota) =

Stream in South Dakota, United States

Coordinates: 45°09′26″N 102°30′29″W

Cabin Creek is a stream in the U.S. state of South Dakota.

Cabin Creek was named for an abandoned cabin near its banks.

== See also ==
- List of rivers of South Dakota
