= Cabin Creek Historic District =

Historic district in Washington, United States

- U.S. National Register of Historic Places
- U.S. Historic district
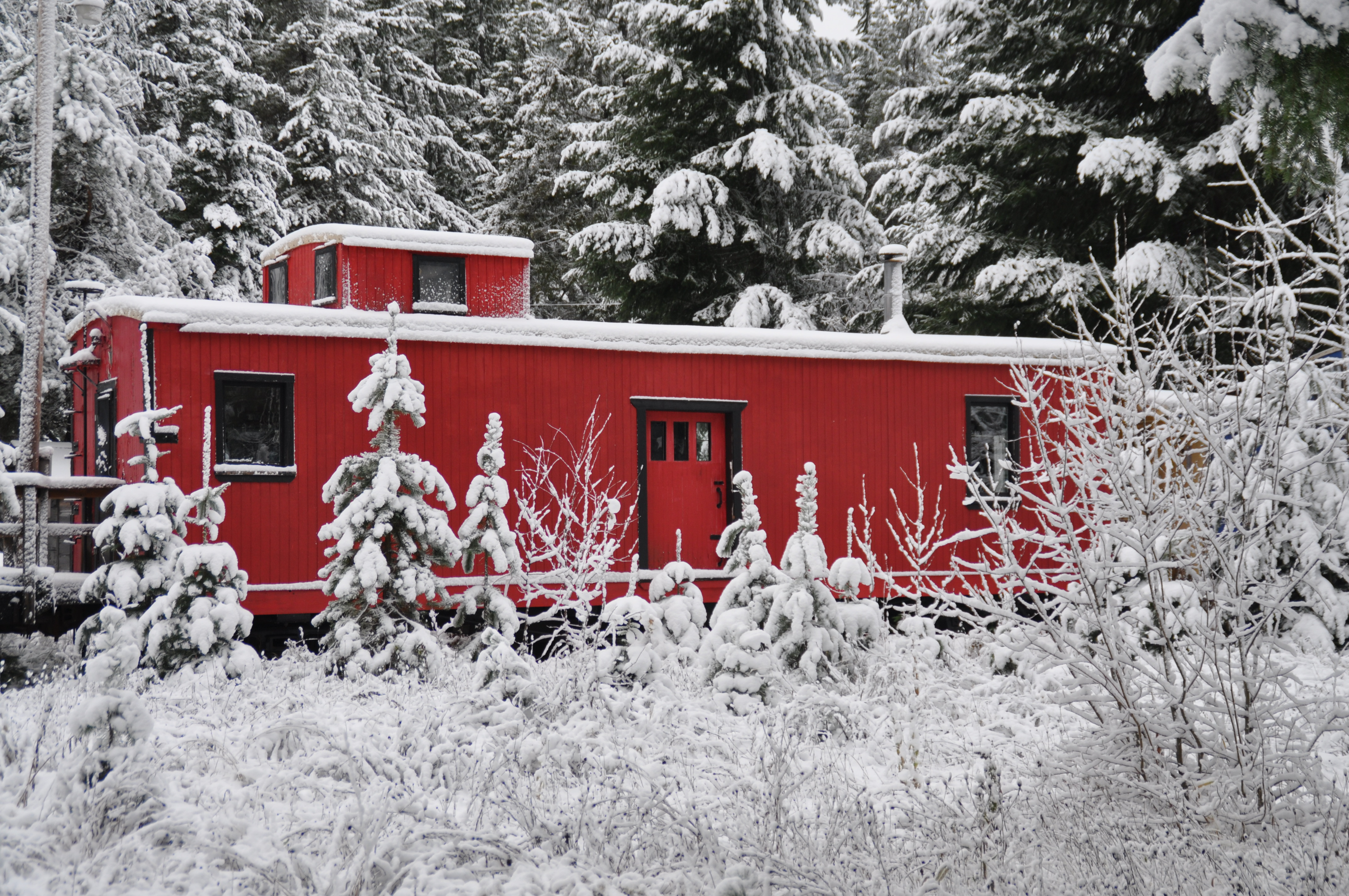
- The Cabin Creek Inn

- Location within Washington (state)
- Nearest city: Easton, Washington
- Area: 52.5 acres (21.2 ha)
- Built: 1916
- NRHP reference No.: 79002545
- Added to NRHP: August 17, 1979

The Cabin Creek Historic District is a privately owned small settlement about five miles west of Easton in Kittitas County, Washington and about 70 miles southeast of Seattle via Interstate 90. It was founded as a sawmill camp along the main line of the Northern Pacific Railway (now the Burlington Northern Railway) in 1916, to the east of the railway's tunnel in the Stampede Pass.

== History ==
The settlement has an elevation of 2,400 feet and is just east of the crest of the Cascade Range. It is wedged between the railway on the north, Cabin Creek, a tributary of the Yakima River, and Cabin Mountain, which has a peak of 4,500 feet.

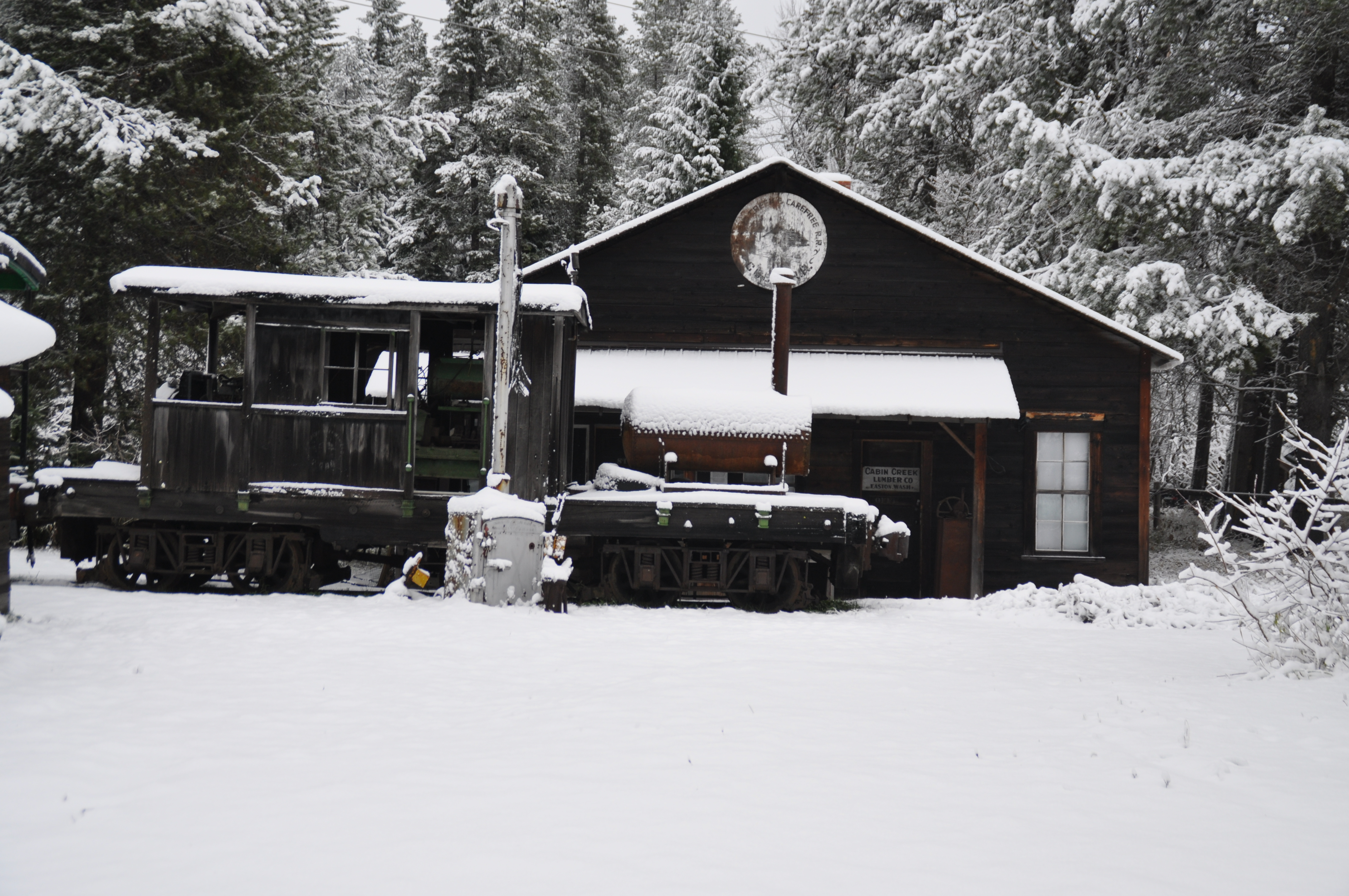
The company store

Buildings remaining from the original camp include the sawmill, the company store, about 24 one-story cabins with associated woodsheds and outhouses, and a schoolhouse, the only building in the original camp which was painted.

The workers' cabins were constructed from unpainted lumber provided free by the mill. Generally they were constructed as one room buildings with tar paper roofs, and were added to as the worker married and had children. Kitchens, extra bedrooms, and sometimes parlors were generally added. Furnishings would include wood-burning stoves, kerosene lamps, and hand cranked phonographs.
