= Battle of Honey Springs =

Battle of the American Civil War

- Part of the Trans-Mississippi Theater of the American Civil War
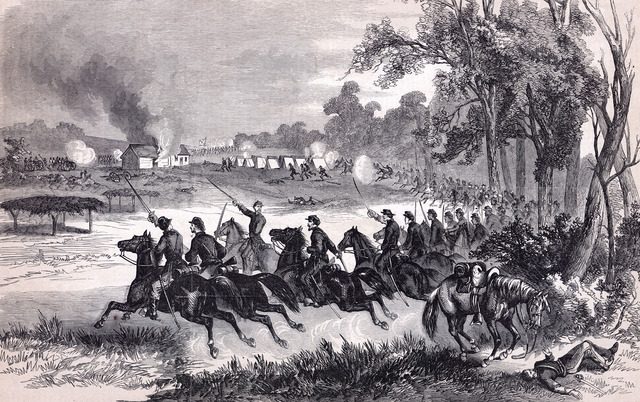
- Union cavalry charge at Honey Springs, 1863. Engraving based on sketch by James R. O'Neill
Date	July 17, 1863
Location	Muskogee County, Oklahoma and McIntosh County, Oklahoma 35.55618°N 95.46990°W
Result	Union victory

Belligerents
(United States) Union	(Confederate States of America) Confederacy; Creek Nation; Choctaw Nation; Cherokee Nation

Commanders and leaders
James G. Blunt	Douglas H. Cooper, William Lewis Cabell

Units involved
District of the Frontier	1st Brigade, Native American troops

Strength
3,000	6,000

Casualties and losses
Disputed: 79 – over 200	Disputed: 180 – over 500

The Battle of Honey Springs, (Note: This name first appeared in General Robert E. Lee's report to Major General John Schofield on July 26, 1863. Schofield was then Commander of the Department of Missouri.) also known as the Affair at Elk Creek, on July 17, 1863, was an American Civil War engagement and an important victory for Union forces in their efforts to gain control of the Indian Territory. It was the largest confrontation between Union and Confederate forces in the area that would eventually become Oklahoma. The engagement was also unique in the fact that white soldiers were the minority in both fighting forces. Native Americans made up a significant portion of each of the opposing armies and the Union force contained African-American units.

The battleground is about 4.5 miles (7.2 km) northeast of what is now Checotah, Oklahoma and 15 miles (24 km) south of Muskogee. It was also about 20 miles (32 km) southwest of Fort Gibson.

== Background ==
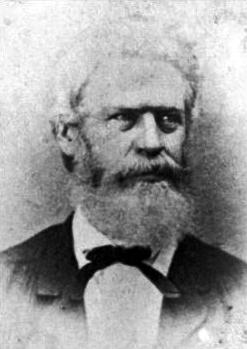
General Douglas H. Cooper, (1815–1879)

At the start of the American Civil War, the United States had abandoned the Five Civilized Tribes so for cultural and economic reasons, all of the Five Civilized Tribes in Indian Territory opted to side with the Confederate States of America who had offered them protection, economic resources and sovereignty, raising native troops under the leadership of General Douglas H. Cooper. They drove out pro-Union Creek Indian forces after a short campaign culminating in the Battle of Chustenahlah. However, by 1863, Confederate fortunes in the region had sunk. A Union campaign launched from Kansas led by Major General James G. Blunt drove Confederacy forces from the north of the region, and many of the Cherokee switched sides to support the Union. Union forces led by Colonel William A. Phillips reoccupied Fort Gibson in Indian Territory during April, threatening Confederate forces at Fort Smith. However, Phillips' supply line stretched from Fort Gibson to Fort Scott, Kansas, 175 miles (282 km) to the north along the old Texas Road cattle trail. Confederate cavalry, operating from Cooper's encampment at Honey Springs, frequently harassed Fort Gibson and attacked its supply trains.

The Battle of Honey Springs was important for many reasons, among them:

- The battle was the largest fought in the Indian Territory, based on numbers of troops engaged.
- White soldiers were the minority in both Union and Confederate fighting forces. Native Americans made up a significant portion of each of the opposing armies and African Americans fought with the Union force.
- The loss of the supplies at Honey Springs depot would likewise prove disastrous. Confederate forces, already operating on a shoe-string budget and with bad equipment, would come to increasingly rely on captured Union war material to keep up the fight.
- Honey Springs was an important site along the Texas Road, a north–south artery between north Texas and Baxter Springs, Kansas or Joplin, Missouri. The side that controlled this place could control traffic along the road.
- Honey Springs was a direct threat to Fort Gibson, which controlled shipping on the upper Arkansas River.

== Preparations for battle ==
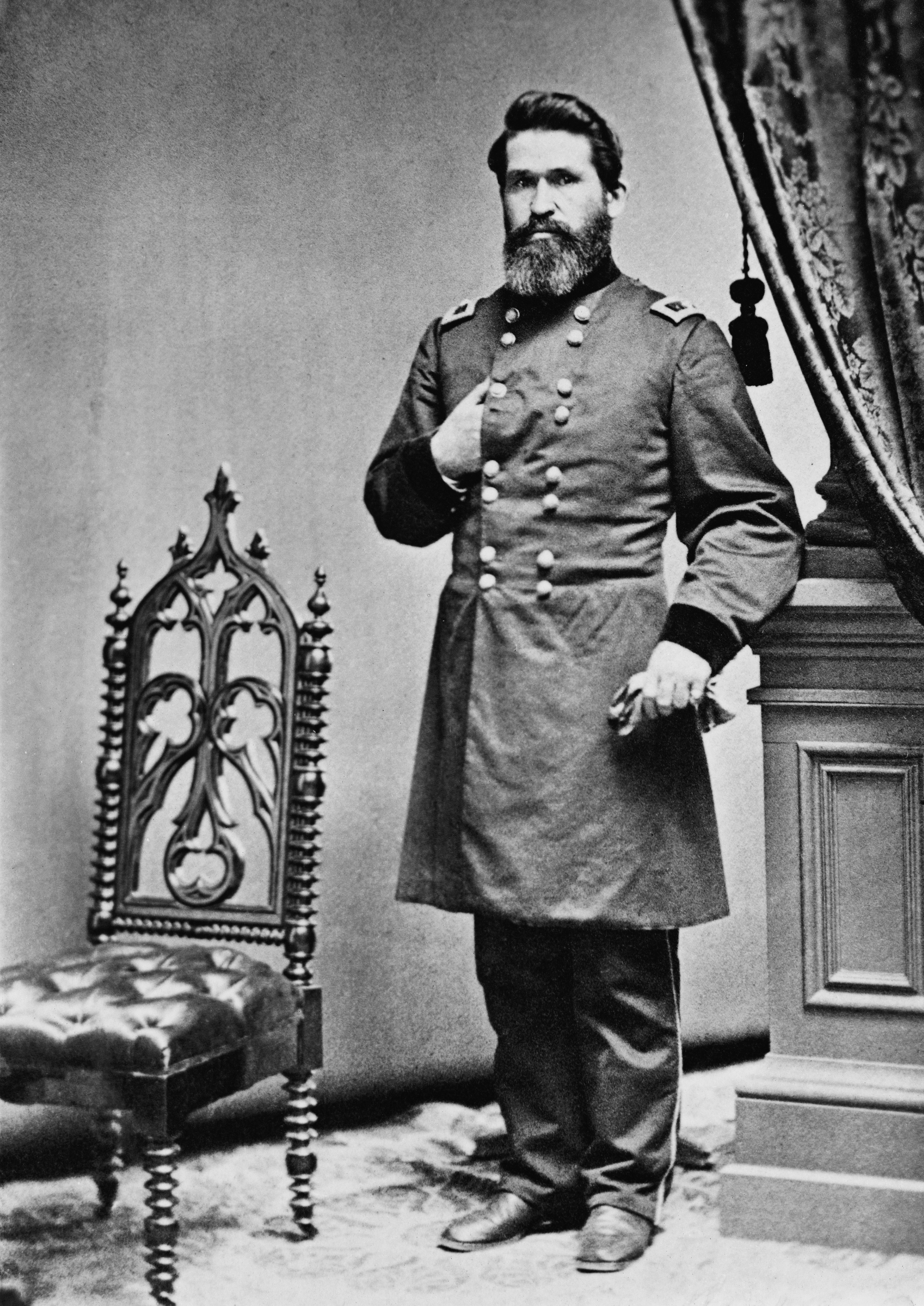
General James G. Blunt (1826–1881)

Honey Springs was a stage stop on the Texas Road before the Civil War. Its several springs provided water for men and horses. The U.S. Army equipped it with a commissary, log hospital, and numerous tents for troops. To prepare for an invasion, in 1863 the Confederate Army sent 6,000 soldiers to the spot. Provisions were supplied from Fort Smith, Boggy Depot, Fort Cobb, Fort Arbuckle, and Fort Washita. However, the Confederates failed to stop a 200-wagon Federal supply train in an engagement known as the Battle of Cabin Creek. The supply train reached Fort Gibson about the same time as General Blunt himself arrived, accompanied by more troops and artillery. Federal forces at the fort totalled only about 3,000 men.

According to his after-action report to General Schofield, Blunt arrived in the area on July 11. He found the Arkansas River was high and ordered his troops to begin building boats to ferry them across the river. During this time, he apparently contracted encephalitis, because he had to spend July 14 in bed fighting a high fever.

Believing they were numerically superior, the Confederates plotted a counteroffensive against Union forces at Fort Gibson, to be launched by Cooper's Indians and some attached Texan troops, and 3,000 soldiers of Brigadier General William Cabell's brigade, camped in Fort Smith, Arkansas, which were expected to reach Honey Springs by July 17. Cooper moved his army forward to Honey Springs, Indian Territory, an important Confederate supply depot, to rest and equip, while awaiting Cabell's brigade, marching to link up with Cooper. Union forces under General Blunt got wind of Cooper's plan however, and opted to attack him first, before Cabell arrived, which would have given the Confederates overwhelming numerical superiority. Blunt's command included three federal Indian Home Guard Regiments recruited from all the Five Nations and the 1st Kansas Colored Infantry, with two white cavalry battalions (6th Kansas and 3rd Wisconsin), one white infantry battalion consisting of six companies of the 2nd Colorado Infantry Regiment, and two Kansas artillery batteries making the remainder.

== The Union advance ==
Blunt's troops crossed the Arkansas River in the late afternoon of July 16. They began marching toward Honey Springs at 11 P. M., and continued through the night. They encountered a Confederate picket near Chimney Rock, a local landmark. (Note: Copper called this Chimney Mountain in his report, and said that it was defended by the Choctaws and Texans, who mounted a successful counterattack. Then a heavy rain began, making the Confederates' cartridges useless, so they returned to Cooper's main camp.) After routing the picket, they met a Confederate scouting party north of Elk Creek. They came upon the Confederate camp on Elk Creek early in the morning on July 17. Confederate pickets saw the enemy guns in the early light and rushed to inform Cooper. After eating breakfast and resting from the march, Blunt formed his men into two brigades. One brigade, led by William A. Phillips and composed of a battalion of the Sixth Kansas Cavalry, the First and Third Regiments of Indian Home Guards, a battalion of the Second Colorado Infantry, and Capt. Henry Hopkins's (four-gun) battery of Kansas Artillery, plus two guns of Captain Edward A. Smith's battery attached to the cavalry. The other brigade, commanded by Col. William R. Judson, consisted of the Third Wisconsin Cavalry, the Second Regiment of Indian Home Guards, and the First Kansas Colored Infantry with an estimated 700 soldiers, and the remainder of Smith's battery of Kansas Artillery.

== Battle ==
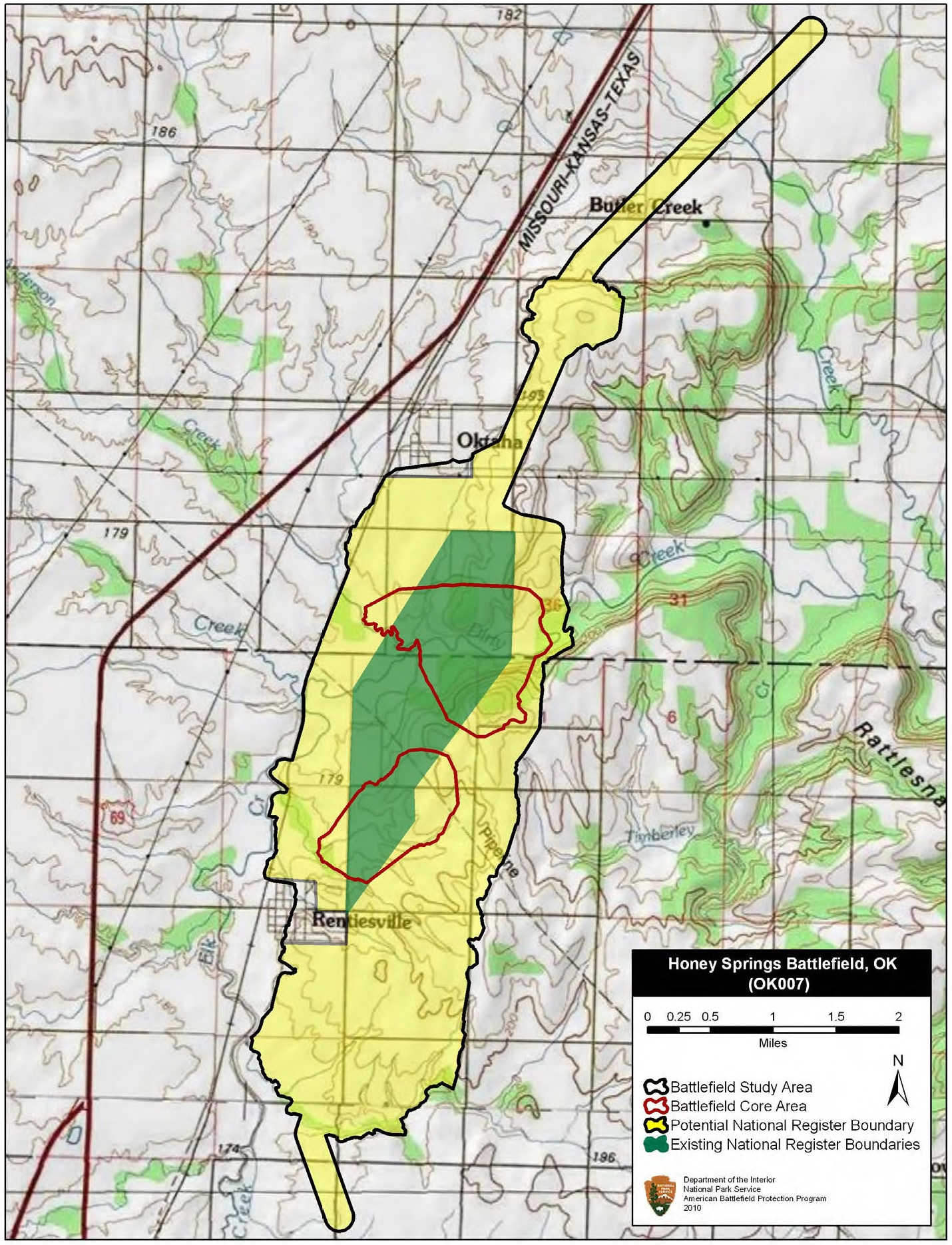
Map of Honey Springs Battlefield core and study areas by the American Battlefield Protection Program.

Blunt's attack began on July 17, with desultory morning skirmishing that revealed many of the Confederate soldiers had wet gunpowder, causing numerous misfires and accidents. The main Union attack began at mid-afternoon, and the beginning of a rain squall intensified the Confederate's ammunition problems. Opposing artillerymen each eliminated one gun on the opposing side during an early artillery duel. Then Blunt saw an opportunity, and ordered the 1st Kansas Colored Infantry to attack. Colonel James M. Williams led the Colored Volunteer infantry forward, but the Confederates held their ground. Williams was wounded, but his troops conducted a disciplined withdrawal and sporadic firing continued. Afterwards, Blunt wrote

I never saw such fighting as was done by the Negro regiment....The question that negroes will fight is settled; besides they make better soldiers in every respect than any troops I have ever had under my command.

During this period the 2nd Indian Home Guards, fighting for the Union, accidentally strayed into no man's land between the Confederate and Union lines. The Federal commanders gave the order for the Home Guards to fall back, the Confederates assumed it was an order to retreat and attacked. The Confederates charged into an established defensive line held by the 1st Kansas Colored Volunteer Infantry, which repulsed the charge.

Cooper pulled his men back towards the depot to obtain new ammunition, but the Federals continued to press his army closely. Heavy fighting occurred when Cooper's men made a stand at a bridge over Elk Creek, roughly 1/4 of a mile south of the original position. Union forces continued driving them back further and gradually beginning to turn Cooper's left, causing a general Confederate retreat. Cooper attempted to fight a rearguard action, making a last stand another 1/2 mile south near Honey Springs Depot. Despite a notable half-hour stand by the Choctaw and Chickasaw regiment, the Indians and Texans were badly organized, disheartened, and in many cases due to poor powder, unarmed. Most simply continued to flee. The fighting was over by 2 p.m., four hours after it had begun.

Victorious Union forces took possession of the Honey Springs depot, burning what couldn't be immediately used, and occupying the field. Blunt trumpeted the battle as a major victory, claiming Union losses of only 76 (17 dead and 60 wounded), with enemy casualties in excess of 500, although Cooper reported only 181 Confederate casualties (134 killed or wounded and 47 taken prisoner). Cooper claimed that his enemy's forces losses were over 200.

== Reasons for Union victory ==
The Union army, including its black and Native American forces, had a definite edge in both quantity and quality of weaponry. The Union artillery had ten 1857 12-pounder Napoleon howitzers, two 6-pound howitzers, and plenty of Springfield rifles. (Note: It is unclear whether these were rifles were the 1855 or the 1861 model, or some combination of the two.) The Union troops also had an abundance of shot, shells and canisters.

The Confederate troops were poorly armed, typically with obsolete smoothbore muskets and flintlock shotguns. Ammunition for these was primarily made with cheap Mexican gunpowder that was very susceptible to damage by rainy weather.

The terrible equipment of the Confederates, and the rain squall which ruined their powder, played a large part in the Confederate defeat, although some eyewitness sources, notably future Creek Indian chief George Washington Grayson, claimed Cooper's poor generalship was responsible for the defeat, arguing that about half the Confederate army was never even engaged.

== Aftermath ==
After the battle, the defeated Confederates withdrew, leaving their dead comrades behind, and met up with Cabell's 3,000 man relief force about 50 miles away. General Blunt did not pursue them because his own troops and horses were very tired. He ordered them to camp overnight at the battlefield, where they could treat the wounded and bury the dead of both sides. Blunt himself was still suffering a high fever from his bout of encephalitis. He finally had to spend the rest of the day in bed. Late the next day Blunt ordered the troops to return to Fort Gibson. Later, Cooper wrote a letter to Blunt, thanking him for burying the Confederate dead. After the war, the Union corpses were exhumed and reburied in Fort Gibson National Cemetery.

The battle was the largest ever fought in the Indian Territory, and would indeed prove to be decisive. The Oklahoma Historical Society even compared its importance to the Battle of Gettysburg. The victory opened the way for Blunt's forces to capture Fort Smith and the Arkansas River Valley all the way to the Mississippi River. The Confederates abandoned Fort Smith in August, 1863, leaving it for the Union forces to recover. Despite the efforts of notable Confederate officers like Stand Watie, Confederate forces in the region would never regain the initiative or engage the Union army in an open, head-on battle again, instead relying almost entirely on guerrilla warfare and small-scale cavalry actions to fight the Federal Army. The loss of the supplies at Honey Springs depot would likewise prove disastrous. Confederate forces, already operating on a shoe-string budget and with bad equipment, would come to increasingly rely on captured Union war material to keep up the fight.

== Opposing forces ==
=== Union ===
Division	Brigade	Regiments and Others
District of the Frontier Major General James G. Blunt	1st Brigade Colonel William R. Judson	2nd Indian Home Guard - Lieutenant Colonel Fred W. Schaurte; 1st Kansas Colored Infantry - Colonel James Monroe Williams (w), Lieutenant Colonel John Bowles; 3rd Wisconsin Cavalry (6 companies) - Captain Edward R. Stevens
District of the Frontier Major General James G. Blunt	2nd Brigade Colonel William A. Phillips	2nd Colorado Infantry (6 companies) - Colonel Theodore H. Dodd; 1st Indian Home Guard - Colonel Stephen H. Wattles; 6th Kansas Cavalry (detachment)* - Colonel William F. Campbell
District of the Frontier Major General James G. Blunt	Artillery	2nd Kansas Light Artillery Battery - Captain Edward A. Smith; 1st Section - Captain Edward A. Smith; 2nd Section - Lieutenant John P. Grassberger; 3rd Kansas Light Artillery Battery* - Captain Henry Hopkins

=== Confederate ===
Division	Brigade	Regiments and Others
District of Indian Territory Brigadier General Douglas H. Cooper	Texas Brigade Colonel Thomas C. Bass	20th Texas Cavalry (Dismounted) - Colonel Thomas Coker Bass; 29th Texas Cavalry – Colonel Charles DeMorse (w); 5th Texas Partisan Rangers- Colonel Leonidas M. Martin
District of Indian Territory Brigadier General Douglas H. Cooper	Indian Brigade Brigadier General Douglas Cooper	1st Cherokee Mounted Rifles - Major Joseph F. Thompson; 2nd Cherokee Mounted Rifles - Lieutenant Colonel James M. Bell; 1st Choctaw—Chickasaw Mounted Rifles - Colonel Tandy Walker; 1st Creek - Colonel Daniel N. McIntosh; 2nd Creek - Colonel Chilly McIntosh
District of Indian Territory Brigadier General Douglas H. Cooper	Artillery	Lee's Battery - Captain Roswell W. Lee; Scanland's Squadron Texas Cavalry - Captain John Scanland; Gillett's Squadron Texas Cavalry - Captain L. E. Gillett

Colonel Stand Watie was supposed to have participated in the battle, but just before it began, Cooper sent them toward Webbers Falls as a diversion.

== Battlefield today ==
The battlefield is located east of U.S. Highway 69 in McIntosh County, Oklahoma, between Rentiesville, and Oktaha. It is managed by the Oklahoma Historical Society. According to the 1997 Master Plan Report, the original battlefield covered 2,997 acres (1,213 ha), of which the Oklahoma Historical Society owned 957 acres (387 ha) in 1997. The northern third is in Muskogee County and the southern two-thirds is in McIntosh County. (Note: The 1997 Master Plan Report was prepared by:The Center for Advanced SpatialTechnologies, University of Arkansas at Fayetteville for the National Park Service American Battlefield Protection Program and the Oklahoma Historical Society.) The American Battlefield Trust and its partners have acquired and preserved more than 83 acres (0.34 km^{2}) of the battlefield as of mid-2023.

A November 2011 story in the Tulsa World newspaper cites the U.S. Department of the Interior report as giving consideration of designating the Honey Springs Battlefield as a U.S. National Battlefield Park. In 2013 the battlefield was named a National Historic Landmark by the National Park Service.

On August 21, 2011, the U.S. Department of Agriculture Rural Development announced a $1.9 million public-private partnership that includes the Oklahoma Historical Society, McIntosh County and an area nonprofit organization to build a 5,000-square-foot (460 m^{2}) visitor center to replace the prior facility consisting of a small trailer. The visitor center was constructed in 2017, but it took another 5 years to fund and complete the permanent exhibits, with the dedication occurring November 5, 2022.

== See also ==
- List of battles fought in Oklahoma
- List of National Historic Landmarks in Oklahoma
- National Register of Historic Places listings in McIntosh County, Oklahoma
- National Register of Historic Places listings in Muskogee County, Oklahoma

== Sources ==
- Epple, Jess C., "Honey Springs Depot, Elk Creek, Creek Nation, Indian Territory" 1964, reprint/revised 2002 and 2019 (ISBN 0-9766282-0-1)
- Mark A. Lause, Race and Radicalism in the Union Army
- National Park Battle Summary
- War in the Indian Nations 1861–1863 – extensive bibliography
- CWSAC Report Update and Resurvey: Individual Battlefield Profiles
- The Battle of Honey Springs: The Civil War Comes to the Indian Territory, a National Park Service Teaching with Historic Places (TwHP) lesson plan
- Honey Springs Battlefield Park – 1997 Master Plan Report. Hama, Karen and R. Brian Culpepper. Prepared by: The Center for Advanced Spatial Technologies, University of Arkansas, Fayetteville, Arkansas. 1997. Retrieved August 26, 2014.
- Honey Springs Battlefield Park 1997 Master Plan Report – Appendix.
