= Second Battle of Cabin Creek =

1864 battle of the American Civil War

- Part of American Civil War
Date	September 19, 1864 (161 years ago)
Location	Cabin Creek, Cherokee Nation (present-day Mayes County, Oklahoma) 36°29′20.5″N 95°07′22.3″W
Result	Confederate victory

Belligerents
Confederate States	United States (Union)

Commanders and leaders
(Confederate States of America) Richard M. Gano (Confederate States of America) Stand Watie	(United States) Henry Hopkins

Units involved
5th Texas Cavalry Brigade; 1st Indian Brigade	Detachments of the 2d Kansas Cavalry, 6th Kansas Cavalry, 14th Kansas Cavalry, 2d Indian and 3d Indian regiments

Strength
2,000 cavalry and 6 guns	150 mounted and 470 dismounted cavalry

Casualties and losses
9 dead and 38 wounded	35 dead, wounded or missing
- (Note: Union strength includes only Union military escorts) (Note: Gano reported number wounded in his command, Waite did not report the number wounded) (Note: The Photographic History of the Civil War Vol III "The Decesive Battles". p. 332 reports Union casualties Sept 16 and 18 1864 Fort Gibson Indian Terr. as 38 killed and 48 missing)
- Location within Oklahoma

The Second Battle of Cabin Creek was part of a plan conceived by Confederate Brigadier General Stand Watie, who had been promoted from colonel after the First Battle of Cabin Creek. The plan was to have a Confederate force attack central Kansas from Indian Territory, raiding Union Army facilities and encouraging Indian tribes in Western Kansas to join in an attack on the eastern part of the state. Watie presented the plan to his superior, General S. B. Maxey on February 5, 1864. Maxey approved the plan on the condition that the attack would start by October 1, to coincide with an attack on Missouri already planned by General Sterling Price.

== Background ==
Brigadier-General Richard M. Gano and Watie met at Camp Pike in the Choctaw Nation on 13 September 1864, to make plans for the coming expedition. Gano, commanding several Texas Confederate units, had agreed to join Watie as co-leader of the campaign. Watie, however, knew that most of the Texans hated all the Indians, including their allies, and resented his promotion in the Confederate Army. According to one account, "...Colonel Charles DeMorse of the 29th Texas Cavalry Regiment refused to serve under him." Watie, therefore, deferred to Gano as commander of the expedition. Both Gano and Maxey commended Waite for this act of solidarity. Moreover, Gano had more seniority as a Confederate general than did Watie. Watie would continue to command the Indian Brigade, composed of about 800 men. Gano's brigade comprised Texas cavalry and artillery units containing about 1,200 men.

The raid had targeted a wagon train that left Fort Scott on 12 September. It carried supplies and provisions intended for Native Americans who had fled their homes and camped near Fort Gibson. It was led by Major Henry Hopkins. The train was escorted by 80 soldiers of the 2d Kansas Cavalry, 50 men from the 6th Kansas Cavalry and 130 men of the 14th Kansas Cavalry regiments. A group of 100 pro-Union Cherokees joined the train at Baxter Springs, Kansas, but half were left at the Neosho River junction to guard the rear. The escort was to be increased by 170 Union Cherokees of the 2nd Indian Regiment, based at Cabin Creek, and 140 Cherokees of the 3d Indian Regiment en route from Fort Gibson

Major Hopkins received a message to move the train to Cabin Creek as fast as possible and await further orders. The message also said that Major John A. Foreman, six companies of men and two howitzers were en route as a relief force. The train arrived at Cabin Creek station during the afternoon of September 18.

== Prelude ==
On 16 September, as they were waiting for the supply train, the Confederates happened to encounter a detachment of black Union soldiers conducting hay-making operations at Flat Rock, near the confluence of Flat Rock Creek and the Grand River, about 5 miles (8.0 km) northeast of present-day Wagoner, Oklahoma and 15 miles (24 km) northwest of Fort Gibson. Captain E. A. Barker leading a small group of the 2d Kansas Cavalry and a detachment from the 1st Kansas Colored Infantry, who were guarding the operation, were soon surrounded and attacked from all sides. In desperation, Barker ordered his men with horses to attempt a breakout. Only 15 of the 65 men who attempted to break out reached the fort. The Union troops lost all their hay-making equipment, several hundred tons of hay and over 100 casualties (including prisoners). There were unconfirmed reports that many of the black troops were killed by the Texans. (Note: Hancock wrote that this encounter was sometimes known as "The Flat Rock Battle.") These killings led to one historian's calling the action one of Watie's three most infamous actions of the war.

== Battle ==
The assault at what became the Cabin Creek battlefield began at 1:00 A.M. on September 19. The Confederates advanced with the Texans covering the left flank and the Indian Brigade on the right flank. After the Union troops began to fire, the Confederate artillery answered. The barrage caused the mules to panic and run. Many dragged their wagons with them. Some were so terrified that they fell off the bluff and into Cabin Creek. The teamsters managed cut many of the mules from their traces. Men jumped on the mules and rode across the ford to safer ground.

Sunrise revealed the Union positions. Gano moved part of his artillery to his right flank, so that the wagon train would be caught in crossfire. The two Cherokee regiments moved across the creek to capture the wagons that had escaped in the darkness. The Texans, led by Gano himself, attacked the Union flank, driving it back until the defenders were scattered in the wooded bottoms along the creek. By 9:00 A.M., the Union forces had been routed. Major Hopkins escaped to Fort Gibson, hoping to meet the Major Foreman's relief force and recapture the train. Failing to find the relief force, he continued to Fort Gibson bearing the news of the disaster.

== Aftermath ==
The Confederate force, led by Watie and Gano captured a Federal wagon train about $1 million worth of wagons, mules, commissary supplies, and other needed items. Specifically, the booty included 740 mules and 130 wagons. Although Watie and his troops were commended for their success by Confederate President Jefferson Davis and the Confederate Congress, this battle had no significant impact on the outcome of the Civil War in Indian Territory.

== See also ==
- List of American Civil War battles
- List of battles fought in Oklahoma
- Troop engagements of the American Civil War, 1864
