= 5th Kansas Cavalry Regiment =

- Active: 1861–1865
- Disbanded: August 22, 1865
- Country: United States
- Allegiance: Kansas
- Branch: Volunteers
- Type: Cavalry
- Size: Regiment
- Engagements: American Civil War; Battle of Pine Bluff; Battle of Bayou Fourche; Second Battle of Lexington; Battle of Little Blue River; Second Battle of Independence; Battle of Byram's Ford; Battle of Westport; Battle of Marais des Cygnes; Battle of Mine Creek; Battle of Marmiton River; Second Battle of Newtonia

Commanders
- Notable commanders: Powell Clayton

The 5th Kansas Cavalry Regiment was a cavalry regiment that served in the Union Army during the American Civil War.

== Service ==
The 5th Kansas Cavalry was organized at Leavenworth, Kansas, from July 12, 1861 through January 22, 1862. Companies L and M were organized April through July 1862. It was mustered in under the command of Colonel Hamilton P. Johnson.

The regiment was attached to Department of Kansas to June 1862. Unattached, Army of Southwest Missouri, Department of Missouri, to July 1862. District of Eastern Arkansas, Department of Missouri, to December 1862. 2nd Brigade, 3rd Cavalry Division, District of Eastern Arkansas, Department of Missouri, to January 1863. 2nd Brigade, 2nd Cavalry Division, XIII Corps, Army of the Tennessee, to April 1863. 2nd Brigade, District of Eastern Arkansas, Department of Tennessee, to June 1863. Clayton's Independent Brigade, District of Eastern Arkansas, Department of Tennessee, to August 1863. Clayton's Cavalry Brigade, Arkansas Expedition, to January 1864. Pine Bluff, Arkansas, VII Corps, Department of Arkansas, to September 1864. 1st Brigade, Cavalry Division, VII Corps, to February 1865. Post St. Charles, VII Corps, to August 1865.

Companies A through H of the 5th Kansas Cavalry mustered out of service at Fort Leavenworth August 11 through December 8, 1864. Companies I and K mustered out on June 22, 1865, at Pine Bluff and Little Rock, Arkansas. Companies L and M were consolidated with the 15th Kansas Cavalry.

== Detailed service ==
Companies A and F moved to Kansas City, Missouri, July 17, 1861. Expedition to Harrisonville July 20–25. Skirmish at Harrisonville July 25 (Companies A and F). Regiment moved to Fort Scott, Kansas, as escort to a supply train and duty there until September 17, 1861. (Companies B, C, and E joined at Fort Scott.) Ball's and Morse's Mills August 28–29. Fort Scott September 1. Drywood Creek, Fort Scott, September 2. Fort Scott September 3. Papinsville September 5. Morristown September 17. Moved to West Point, Missouri, September 17; then with 3rd and 4th Kansas to Osceola. Actions with Price at Osceola September 20, 21 and 22. Butler October 1. West Point October 5. Moved to Kansas City, Missouri, then to Springfield, Missouri, and joined Fremont. Little Santa Fe November 6. Moved to Fort Scott, Ossawatomee, and Fort Lincoln, Kansas, and duty at Camp Denver, near Barnesville, until February 1862. Camp near Fort Scott until March 17. March to Carthage, Missouri, March 17–19. Duty there until April 10. Moved to Springfield, Missouri, April 10–12. Turnback Creek April 26. Moved to Houston May 25–27, then to Rolla, Missouri. March to Join Curtis June 17. Eminence June 17. March to Helena, Arkansas, June 17-July 12. (Companies A, D, and K escorted supply train June 25-July 14.) Salem July 6. Jacksonport, Black River, July 8. Duty at Helena, Arkansas, until August. Operations against Quantrill in Kansas August 20–28, 1862 (detachment). Washburne's Expedition from Helena against Mobile & Ohio Railroad July 24–26, 1862 (Company C). Expedition to Oldtown and Trenton July 28–31 (Company C). Clayton's Expedition toward Clarendon August 4–17. Expedition to Johnsonville and Marianna September 26 (detachment). Action at Trenton October 14. Expedition to Moro November 5–8 (detachment). Expedition against Arkansas Post November 16–26. Expedition to Grenada, Mississippi, November 27-December 5. Oakland, Mississippi, December 8. Expedition to Big and Little Creeks and skirmishes March 6–10, 1863 (detachment). Little Rock Road April 2 (Company G). Mount Vernon May 11. Polk's Plantation, near Helena, May 25. Repulse of Holmes' attack on Helena July 4. Steele's Expedition to Little Rock August 1-September 10. Bayou Metoe August 27. Bayou Fourche and capture of Little Rock September 10. Near Brownsville September 12. Moved to Pine Bluff September 14 and duty there until March 27, 1864. Tulip October 10, 1863. Pine Bluff October 25. Scout to Monticello January 13–14, 1864. Monticello January 16. Branchville, Ivy's Ford, January 19. Expedition to Mount Elba and Longview March 27–31. Branchville March 27 (detachment). Longview March 29–30. Action at Mount Elba and pursuit to Big Creek March 30. Swan Lake April 23. Mark's Mills April 25 (detachment). Duty at Pine Bluff and Little Rock until October 1864. Monticello Road, near Pine Bluff, June 17. Reconnaissance from Pine Bluff July 13. Scout on Arkansas River, near Pine Bluff, and skirmishes August 27–28. Expedition from Pine Bluff September 9–11 (detachment). Near Monticello September 10. Brewer's Lane September 11. Reconnaissance from Little Rock toward Monticello and Mount Elba October 4–11. Expedition from Kansas into Missouri June 16–20, 1864 (Company L). Pursuit of Price through Arkansas and Missouri September–October. Lexington, Missouri, October 19. Little Blue October 21. Independence October 22. Big Blue and State Line October 22. Westport October 23. Mine Creek, Little Osage River, and Marias Des Cygnes October 26. Battle of Charlot October 25. Mound City and Fort Lincoln October 25. Newtonia October 28. Scout to Rich land December 24 (detachment). Near Oxford January 13, 1865 (detachment).

== Casualties ==
The regiment lost a total of 268 men during service; 2 officers and 45 enlisted men killed or mortally wounded, 2 officers and 219 enlisted men died of disease.

== Commanders ==
- Colonel Hamilton P. Johnson - killed in action at Morristown, Missouri, September 17, 1861
- Colonel Powell Clayton
- Lieutenant Colonel John Ritchie
- Lieutenant Colonel T. W. Scudder

== In popular culture ==
In the 1999 Civil War film Ride with the Devil, the regiment non-historically chases and defeats Bushwhackers led by Quantrill after their raid on Lawrence.

== See also ==
- List of Kansas Civil War Units
