= Fort Gibson =

- U.S. National Register of Historic Places
- U.S. National Historic Landmark
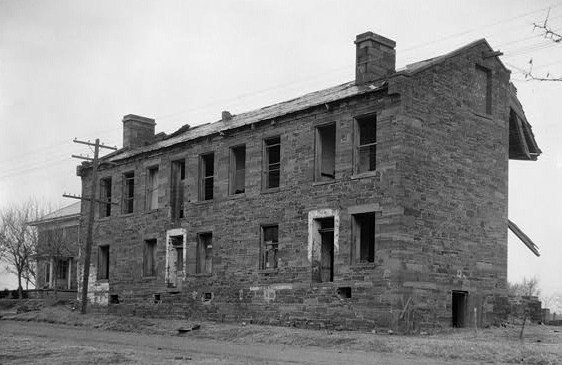
- Fort Gibson Barracks Building in 1934

- Location within Oklahoma Location within the United States
- Location: Fort Gibson, Oklahoma
- Coordinates: 35°48′14″N 95°15′26″W
- Area: 42 acres (17 ha)
- Built: 1824
- Architect: Matthew Arbuckle
- NRHP reference No.: 66000631

Significant dates
- Added to NRHP: October 15, 1966
- Designated NHL: December 19, 1960

Fort Gibson is a historic military site next to the modern city of Fort Gibson, in Muskogee County Oklahoma. It guarded the American frontier in Indian Territory from 1824 to 1888. When it was constructed, the fort was farther west than any other military post in the United States. It formed part of the north–south chain of forts that was intended to maintain peace on the frontier of the American West and to protect the southwestern border of the Louisiana Purchase. The fort succeeded in its peacekeeping mission for more than 50 years, as no massacres or battles occurred there.

The site is now managed by the Oklahoma Historical Society as the Fort Gibson Historical Site and is a National Historic Landmark.

== Building the fort ==
Colonel Matthew Arbuckle commanded the 7th Infantry Regiment (United States) from Fort Smith, Arkansas. He moved some of his troops to establish Cantonment Gibson on 21 April 1824 on the Grand River (Oklahoma) just above its confluence with the Arkansas River. This was part of a series of forts which the United States established to protect its western border and the extensive Louisiana Purchase. The US Army named the fort for Colonel (later General) George Gibson, Commissary General of Subsistence. The post surgeon began taking meteorological observations in 1824, and the fort provided the earliest known weather records in Oklahoma. Colonel Arbuckle also established Fort Towson in southern Indian Territory. In the early years, troops constructed a stockade, barracks, other facilities, and roads. They also settled strife between the indigenous Osage Nation, which had been in the area since the seventeenth century, and the earliest bands of western Cherokee settlers.

== Indian removal ==
Congress passed the Indian Removal Act in 1830, which led to a new mission for Cantonment Gibson. The Army designated the cantonment as Fort Gibson in 1832, reflecting its change from a temporary outpost to a semi-permanent garrison. Soldiers at Fort Gibson increasingly dealt with Indians forcibly removed from the eastern states to Indian Territory. These newcomers complained about hostility from the Osage Nation and other Plains Indian tribes indigenous to the region. Montfort Stokes, former governor of North Carolina, convened a commission at Fort Gibson to address these problems, and troops at the fort supported its work. The American author Washington Irving accompanied troops exploring the southern Plains west of Fort Gibson in 1832. This excursion and another journey in 1833 both failed to find any significant nomadic Indian tribes, but Washington Irving wrote A Tour of the Prairies in 1835 from his experiences.

General Henry Leavenworth in 1834 led the First Dragoon Expedition on a peace mission to the west, and finally established contact with the nomadic Indian tribes. The artist George Catlin traveled with the dragoons and made numerous studies. General Leavenworth died during the march, and Colonel Henry Dodge replaced him in command. The expedition finally established contact and negotiated the first treaty with the Indian tribes. Debilitating fevers struck and killed many men on this expedition, posing more of a danger than the Native Americans. A West Point officer assigned to the fort said the men felt that expeditions to the Plains in the 1830s were "a veritable death sentence." During these years, the soldiers at Fort Gibson built roads, provisioned incoming American Indians removed from the eastern states, and worked to maintain peace among antagonistic tribes and factions, including the Osage Nation, who settled the region in the 18th century, and the Cherokee Nation, a people forcibly removed from the American South to the Indian Territory.

During the Texas Revolution against the weak Mexican government, the Army sent most of the troops stationed at Fort Gibson to the Texas border region. Their absence weakened the military power and pacification capacity at Fort Gibson, but the reduced garrison maintained stability in the region.

At the height of Indian removal in the 1830s, the garrison at Fort Gibson ranked as the largest in the nation. Notable American soldiers stationed at (or at least visiting) Fort Gibson include Stephen W. Kearny, Robert E. Lee, and Zachary Taylor. The Army stationed Jefferson Davis, later president of the Confederate States of America, and more than 100 other West Point cadets at the fort. The Army also assigned Nathan Boone, son of the famous explorer Daniel Boone, to the post. After leaving Tennessee, Sam Houston owned a trading post in the area; he later moved to Texas.

At a bitterly contentious meeting at Fort Gibson in 1836, the majority faction of the Muscogee (Creek) reluctantly accepted the existing tribal government under the leadership of Chilly McIntosh, son of William McIntosh, and his faction. Colonel Arbuckle tried to prevent intratribal strife within the Cherokee, but Chief John Ross and his followers refused to acknowledge the government that earlier "Old Settlers" had established in Indian Territory. After suing for peace in the Florida Seminole Wars against the United States Army, many of the Seminole arrived in Indian Territory "bitter and dispirited." Officials at Fort Gibson prevented bloodshed and disunity among them.

== Pacification and first abandonment ==
When Colonel Arbuckle left Fort Gibson in 1841, he reported that despite the arrival of 40,000 eastern Native Americans of decidedly unfriendly disposition, "I have maintained peace on this frontier and at no period have the Whites on our border or the Red people of this frontier been in a more perfect state of quiet and Security than they enjoy now." The removed Native American nations gradually lost their desire for American military protection.

Among the traders who operated at Fort Gibson was John Allen Mathews, who was the husband of the half-Osage Sarah Williams, daughter of William S. Williams.

In the 1850s, the Cherokee complained about the liquor and brothels at Fort Gibson. They tried to prevent the sale of alcohol to their people. The Cherokee ultimately urged Congress to close Fort Gibson, and the War Department heeded their request. On May 7, 1857, Brevet Lt. General Winfield Scott issued General Orders No. 6. to abandon the Fort for the first time. The Cherokee nation received the deed to the property and improvements, and established the village of Kee-too-wah on the site. It became a center of traditionalists and eventually an independently federally recognized tribe of Cherokee.

== American Civil War ==
During the American Civil War, Union troops occasionally occupied the post. During the summer of 1862, Union soldiers repulsed a Confederate invasion of Indian Territory. They left the fort and withdrew to Kansas. In April 1863, Colonel William A. Phillips of the Indian Home Guard (Union Indian Brigade) reoccupied Fort Gibson and kept it in Union hands throughout the remainder of the war. The Army briefly renamed the post Fort Blunt in honor of Brigadier General James G. Blunt, commander of the Department of Kansas. The fort dominated the junction between the Arkansas River and Texas Road, but Confederates never attacked the fort, though an attack on the fort's nearby livestock grew to a heavy encounter in the battle of Fort Gibson. Its troops under General Blunt marched southward in July 1863 and won the Battle of Honey Springs, the most important in Indian Territory.

In the summer of 1864, the steamboat J.R. Williams came up the Arkansas River with a thousand barrels of flour and 15 tons of bacon to resupply Union troops at Fort Gibson. Cherokee Gen. Stand Watie, largely cut off from the rest of the Confederacy, didn't want to sink the boat. He wanted to capture it, along with the food and other supplies on board. The ensuing battle is the only naval battle to have been fought in Oklahoma/Indian Territory History.

After the American Civil War, the US Army retained Fort Gibson. American soldiers ultimately established enduring peace with the Indian tribes of the southern Plains only after 1870, but forts farther west increasingly took on the duties of securing that peace. For more than 50 years, Fort Gibson had kept peace in its area. The Army transferred most troops elsewhere in 1871, leaving only a detachment responsible for provisions in a quartermaster depot.

== Cavalry mission ==
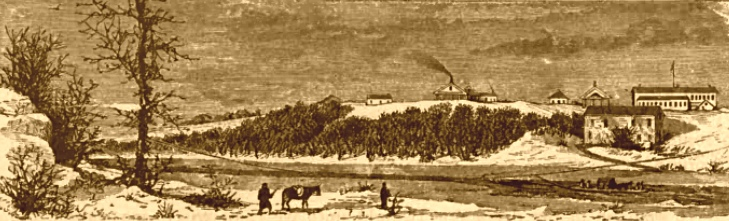
Ft. Gibson in the 1870s.

In 1872 the Tenth Cavalry reoccupied Fort Gibson. Soon after, workers were sent to the area to build the Missouri–Kansas–Texas Railroad from Baxter Springs, the first "cow town," in Kansas, to the Red River crossing at Colbert's Ferry, Indian Territory, along the Texas border. This would improve transportation of cattle and beef to the east as well as shipping of goods from that area to the West. The cavalry from Fort Gibson was used to police the camps of local workers. Soldiers tried to manage threats from outlaws, white encroachment on Indian lands, intra-tribal disputes, and other issues. The size of the garrison varied with the workload.

The Kansas and Arkansas Valley Railway built track through the area in 1888, and the town of Fort Gibson, Oklahoma began to develop. In the summer of 1890, the Army abandoned Fort Gibson for the last time. Troops occasionally camped at the site when unrest brought them to the town of Fort Gibson, which took the name of the fort. After the military permanently departed, the civilian town expanded into the former military grounds of the fort.

== Historic site ==
The Works Project Administration of the Franklin D. Roosevelt administration in the 1930s reconstructed some or all buildings at the fort, as part of historic preservation and construction work that the government sponsored during the Great Depression. In 1960 the National Park Service designated Fort Gibson as a National Historic Landmark.

The old fort was located in present Muskogee County, Oklahoma. It is located at Lee and Ash Streets in Fort Gibson, Oklahoma. The Oklahoma Historical Society operates the site, which includes a reconstruction of the early log fort, original buildings from the 1840s through 1870s, and the Commissary Visitor Center, which has museum exhibits about the history of the fort. The site hosts special living history events and programs.

Fort Gibson National Cemetery lies a few miles away.

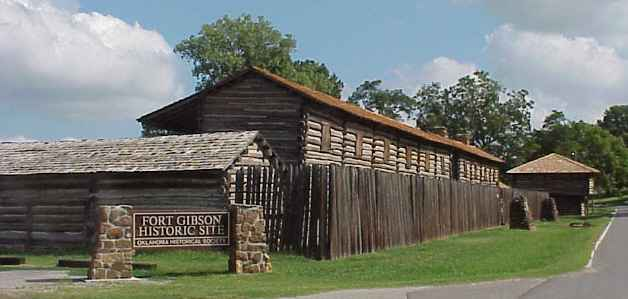
Fort Gibson Historical Area in 2001

== See also ==
- List of National Historic Landmarks in Oklahoma
- Oldest buildings in Oklahoma
- National Register of Historic Places listings in Muskogee County, Oklahoma
