= Vivia Thomas =

Vivia Thomas is an American folk figure.

The popular legend is summarized as follows: a sentry was patrolling the grounds of Fort Gibson in the Indian Territory when he discovered a trooper, young Private Thomas, lying dead across a grave in a nearby cemetery. Approximately two weeks later, on January 6, 1870, a young woman was found frozen to death by his grave. Two days prior to her death, she had revealed the tale to a Fort Gibson chaplain. The story is a small, well-known part of American military history.

== History ==
Thomas was the daughter of a wealthy family from Boston. She was well-educated and a participant in the rituals of Boston society. During a party following the Civil War, Vivia fell in love with an army officer. After months of courtship, their engagement and wedding plans were announced. Shortly before their wedding day the officer disappeared, leaving an apology and explaining that he was going west in search of adventure. Brokenhearted and seeking revenge, Vivia left home to search for him. She learned that he was stationed at Fort Gibson in the Indian Territory and began her long and difficult journey.

During the next several months, Thomas started to disguise herself as a man for protection. The disguise proved successful and when she arrived, she decided to use it to enlist in the Army at Fort Gibson. She spent months working as a soldier, closely watching her former fiancé and observing his behavior. She discovered that he had taken up with an Indian woman who lived a short distance from the fort and visited her often.

In late December 1869, Thomas followed him into the Indian Territory. She hid behind an outcropping of stone and shot him with her rifle as he rode by. The bullet hit him in the chest and knocked him off his horse. The next morning, his body was discovered and brought to the Fort. At first, it was thought that he had been killed by Indians as he was found in their territory.

In the days that followed, Thomas became deeply grieved by what she had done and began to visit his grave every night, praying for forgiveness. She confessed her crime to the Fort Gibson chaplain. Two days later, she was discovered by his grave, frozen to death. When her story became known, she was admired for her service and buried in an honorable place in the Fort Gibson National Cemetery in the officer's circle.

== Legend ==
Thomas' story is claimed by some to take a ghostly turn. Her spirit has not found peace and she still haunts the cemetery plot. Claims include a "delicate" apparition of a young soldier near her grave, weeping loudly.

== Legacy ==
In the Fort Gibson National Cemetery stands a large circle called the Circle of Honor, set aside for soldiers who distinguished themselves in service. Her grave simply reads "Vivia Thomas, January 7, 1870".
