= Commandant's Quarters (Fort Gibson, Oklahoma) =

Historic house in Oklahoma, United States

- U.S. National Register of Historic Places
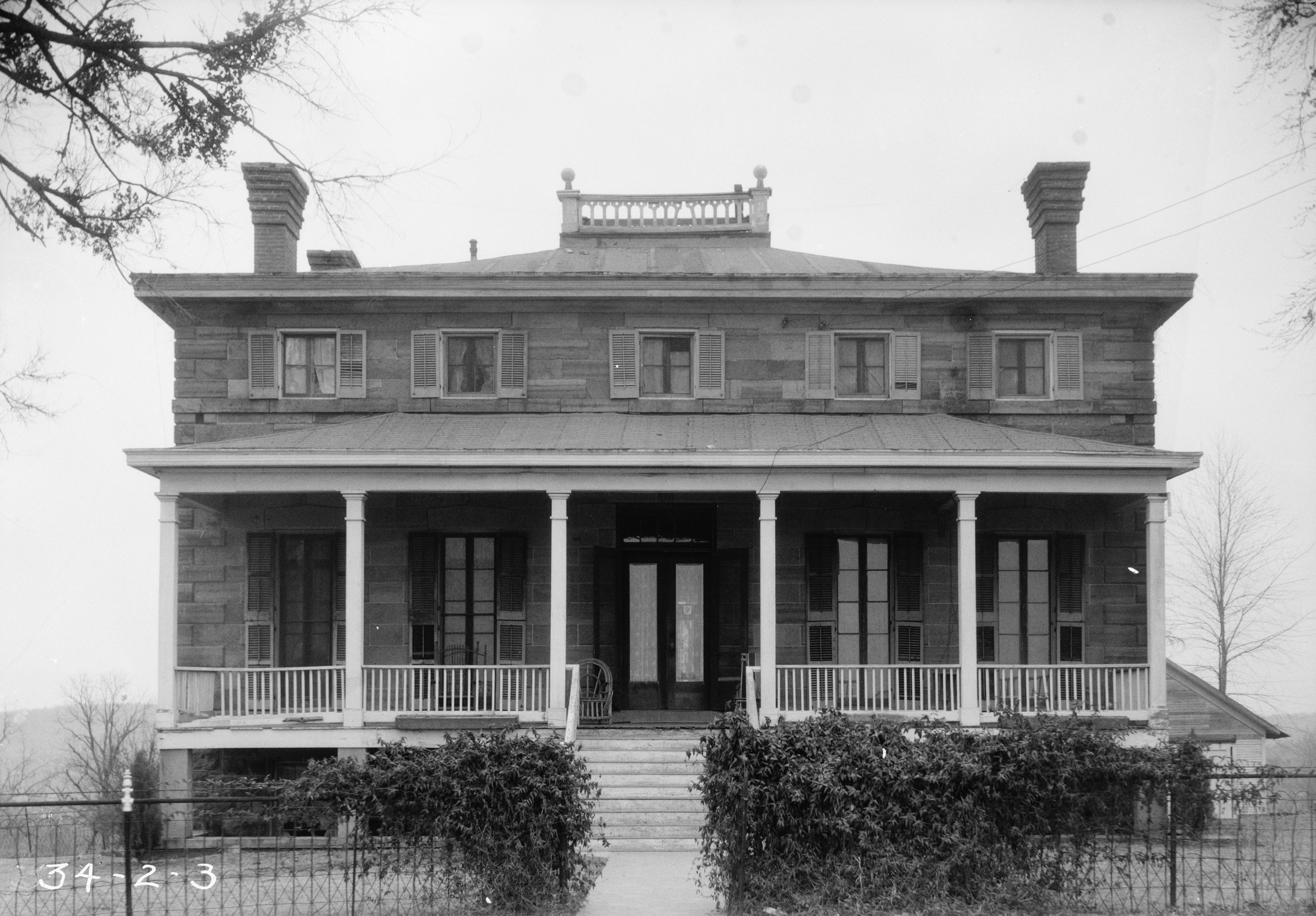
- Front of the house, in HABS photo from 1934

- Location within Oklahoma Location within the United States
- Location: 905 Coppinger Ave, Fort Gibson, Oklahoma
- Coordinates: 35°48′32.16″N 95°15′7.71″W
- Area: less than one acre
- Built: 1868-70
- Architect: A.S. Kimball
- MPS: Fort Gibson Post-Civil War Military Buildings TR
- NRHP reference No.: 85002830
- Added to NRHP: November 14, 1985

Commandant's Quarters of Fort Gibson was built in 1868–70. The building was listed on the National Register of Historic Places in 1985.

It was deemed significant as the residence of the commanding officer and his family, and as a "center of formal functions of celebration, greeting and lodging for significant visiting dignitaries." Located adjacent to the parade grounds, "it served a point of reference and reminder of the order of command present at the fort."

The larger Fort Gibson, which may include this building, was declared a U.S. National Historic Landmark in 1960.

It is located at 504 Coppinger Avenue in Fort Gibson. It was built during 1868–70; its builder/architect was Captain A.S. Kimball. It is a two-and-a-half-story, native stone building, 46 by 40 feet (14 m × 12 m) in plan.
