= John N. Reese Jr. =

United States Army soldier and recipient

John Noah Reese Jr.
- Born: June 13, 1923; Muskogee, Oklahoma, U.S.
- Died: February 9, 1945 (aged 21); Manila, Philippines
- Burial place: Fort Gibson National Cemetery, Fort Gibson, Oklahoma
- Military career
- Allegiance: United States of America
- Branch: United States Army
- Service years: 1942–1945
- Rank: Private First Class
- Units: 148th Infantry Regiment, 37th Infantry Division
- Conflicts: World War II: Battle of Manila †
- Awards: Medal of Honor

John Noah Reese Jr. (June 13, 1923 – February 9, 1945) was a United States Army soldier and a recipient of the United States military's highest decoration—the Medal of Honor—for his actions in World War II.

== Biography ==
Reese joined the Army from Pryor, Oklahoma in December 1942, and by February 9, 1945, was serving as a private first class in Company B, 148th Infantry Regiment, 37th Infantry Division. On that day, during an attack on the Paco Railroad Station in Manila, the Philippines, Reese and fellow soldier Private Cleto L. Rodriguez went ahead of their unit, took a position closer to the station, and began firing on the Japanese defenders. Together they killed over eighty Japanese soldiers before a shortage of ammunition forced them to turn back. Reese was killed while trying to return to the American lines; he was posthumously awarded the Medal of Honor eight months later, on October 19, 1945. Private Rodriguez survived the battle and was also awarded the Medal of Honor.

Reese, aged 21 at his death, was buried in Fort Gibson National Cemetery, Fort Gibson, Oklahoma.

== Medal of Honor citation ==
Private First Class Reese's official Medal of Honor citation reads:

He was engaged in the attack on the Paco Railroad Station, which was strongly defended by 300 determined enemy soldiers with machineguns and rifles, supported by several pillboxes, 3 20mm. guns, 1 37-mm. gun and heavy mortars. While making a frontal assault across an open field, his platoon was halted 100 yards from the station by intense enemy fire. On his own initiative he left the platoon, accompanied by a comrade, and continued forward to a house 60 yards from the objective. Although under constant enemy observation, the 2 men remained in this position for an hour, firing at targets of opportunity, killing more than 35 Japanese and wounding many more. Moving closer to the station and discovering a group of Japanese replacements attempting to reach pillboxes, they opened heavy fire, killed more than 40 and stopped all subsequent attempts to man the emplacements. Enemy fire became more intense as they advanced to within 20 yards of the station. From that point Pfc. Reese provided effective covering fire and courageously drew enemy fire to himself while his companion killed 7 Japanese and destroyed a 20-mm. gun and heavy machinegun with handgrenades. With their ammunition running low, the 2 men started to return to the American lines, alternately providing covering fire for each other as they withdrew. During this movement, Pfc. Reese was killed by enemy fire as he reloaded his rifle. The intrepid team, in 2½ hours of fierce fighting, killed more than 82 Japanese, completely disorganized their defense and paved the way for subsequent complete defeat of the enemy at this strong point. By his gallant determination in the face of tremendous odds, aggressive fighting spirit, and extreme heroism at the cost of his life, Pfc. Reese materially aided the advance of our troops in Manila and providing a lasting inspiration to all those with whom he served.

== Awards and decorations ==
PFC Reese received the following awards for his service

Badge	Combat Infantryman Badge		
1st row	Medal of Honor		Bronze Star Medal Retroactively Awarded, 1947
2nd row	Purple Heart	Army Good Conduct Medal	American Campaign Medal
3rd row	Asiatic-Pacific Campaign Medal with 1 Campaign star	World War II Victory Medal	Philippine Liberation Medal
Unit awards	Philippine Presidential Unit Citation		

== See also ==
- List of Medal of Honor recipients
- List of Medal of Honor recipients for World War II
