= 148th Infantry Regiment (United States) =

1st Battalion 148th Infantry Regiment
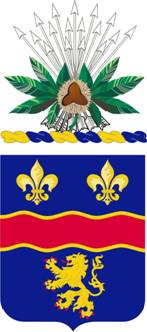
- Coat of Arms of the 1st Battalion 148th Infantry Regiment
- Active: 1846-Present (as 1st Battalion 148th Infantry Regiment)
- Country: United States
- Branch: Ohio Army National Guard
- Type: Light Infantry (Parent Regiment under USARS)
- Role: Light Infantry
- Part of: 37th Infantry Brigade Combat Team (United States)
- Garrison/HQ: Walbridge, Ohio
- Nickname: The One-Four-Eight
- Motto: "WE'LL DO IT"
- Engagements: Mexican-American War; Battle of Buena Vista; American Civil War; Battle of Antietam; Spanish-American War; Poncho Villa; World War I; Battle of Ypres; Recicourt; Avocourt; World War II; Luzon; Battle of Luzon with arrowhead; Lingayen Gulf Landing; Soloman Islands; Operation Cartwheel; Bougainville Campaign; Philippines; Battle of Manila; Operation Noble Eagle; Iraq War (2003-2010) Valorous Unit Award; Iraqi Governance; National Resolution; Operation Joint Guardian Kosovo Defense; War in Afghanistan (2001-2021); Operation Spartan Shield; Operation Inherent Resolve
- Decorations: Presidential Unit Citation, Meritorious Unit Citation with Oak Leak Cluster, Army Superior Service Award, Order of the Day of the Belgian Army, Joint Services Meritorious Unit Award

Commanders
- Battalion Commander: LTC Zachary Dozer
- Command Sergeant Major: CSM Matthew Strausbaugh

Insignia
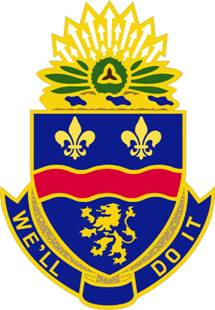
- Distinctive unit insignia

The 148th Infantry Regiment is an Ohio Army National Guard parent regiment under the U.S. Army Regimental System, with headquarters at Walbridge, Ohio. It currently consists of the 1st Battalion, 148th Infantry Regiment, an infantry battalion of the 37th Infantry Brigade Combat Team located throughout northwest Ohio.

With history that predates the American Civil War in 1846, the light infantry regiment was officially organized 14 September 1877 in the Ohio Army National Guard from previously established units in Northwestern Ohio as the 16th Infantry Regiment. It exists today under its current naming convention since 15 September 1917 with the redesignation of the 3rd Regiment, Ohio Volunteer Infantry, as part of the 74th Brigade, 37th Infantry Division.

== Mission ==
The 1-148th Infantry Battalion of the Ohio Army National Guard has the federal mission to close with the enemy by means of fire and maneuver in order to destroy or capture them or repel their assault by fire, close combat, and counterattack. The state mission of the battalion is to provide units trained and equipped for immediate deployment in support of natural disasters and civil disturbances within the state of Ohio and as an aid to civil authorities for domestic disaster preparedness and emergency response, and aid to civil authorities.

=== Organization ===
The 1st Battalion, 148th Infantry Regiment, Ohio Army National Guard, is part of the 37th Infantry Brigade Combat Team, Columbus, Ohio. The 1-148th Infantry Battalion is currently composed of five assigned and one attached unit:

| Company | Headquarters |
|---|---|
| Headquarters and Headquarters Company (HHC) | Walbridge, Ohio |
| Company A (Light Infantry) | Walbridge, Ohio |
| Company B (Light Infantry) | Bowling Green, Ohio |
| Company C (Light Infantry) | Tiffin, Ohio |
| Company D (Light Infantry) | Sandusky, Ohio |
| Company G (Attached from 237th Brigade Support Battalion) | Lima, Ohio |

Historical companies: Company E fought the Japanese in Paco District during the Battle of Manila in February 1945. Company F as the predecessor to Company B, in March 1944, earned the Presidential Unit Citation during the Battle of Hill 700 on Bougainville Island. Company H Tank Corps, organized in 1920 in Port Clinton, OH and subsequently dissolved into the remaining companies. Company I through M World War I organizations.

Most personnel are on traditional reserve status who serve in the military on a part-time basis while leaving civilian occupations to participate one weekend a month as well as two weeks of annual training each year, or more as directed by the state with several full-time staff per company. The 148th Infantry Regiment has been activated, redesignated, deactivated, and reactivated many times. Each of the units and men that made up the 148th Infantry have made sacrifices to their nation and left a record of distinguished achievements.

== History ==
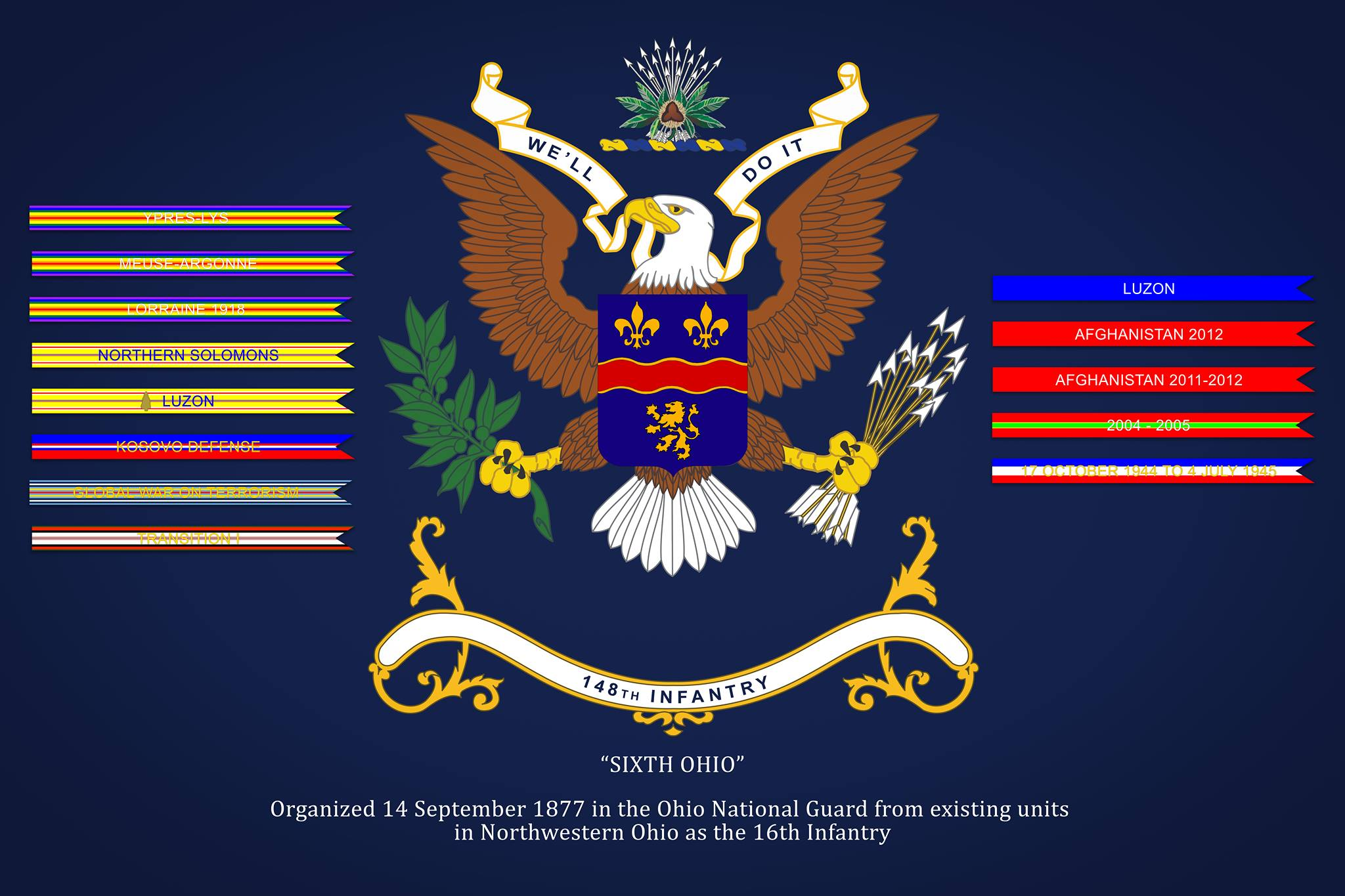
1-148th Infantry Regiment Crest and Banners

The 148th Infantry Regiment participated in military actions including: Mexican-American War, American Civil War, Spanish–American War. World War I and World War II. The 148th Infantry Regiment received the Presidential Unit Citation (Army), Meritorious Unit Citation with Oak Leak Cluster, Philippine Presidential Unit Citation for 1942 & 1945 campaigns, and Army Superior Service Award, and cited in the Order of the Day of the Belgian Army. The 148th Infantry received the Joint Services Meritorious Unit Award for its participation in the 1996 Atlanta Olympics Detail. Seven individuals in the 148th have distinguished themselves with the Medal of Honor to include Albert E. Baesel, Rodger Young, John N. Reese Jr., Cleto Rodriguez, Robert M. Viale, Joseph J. Cicchetti, and Frank J. Petrarca.

=== Mexican-American War 1846 ===
The 148th Infantry Regiment was designated in June 1846 at Camp Washington, OH, as the 2nd Ohio Infantry Regiment, Ohio Volunteer Infantry for the Mexican-American War.

=== Battle of Buena Vista - Mexican-American War 1847 ===
The 148th Infantry Regiment displays a campaign streamer for Buena Vista on its organizational colors as a descendant of the 2nd Ohio Infantry Regiment.

=== American Civil War 1861 ===
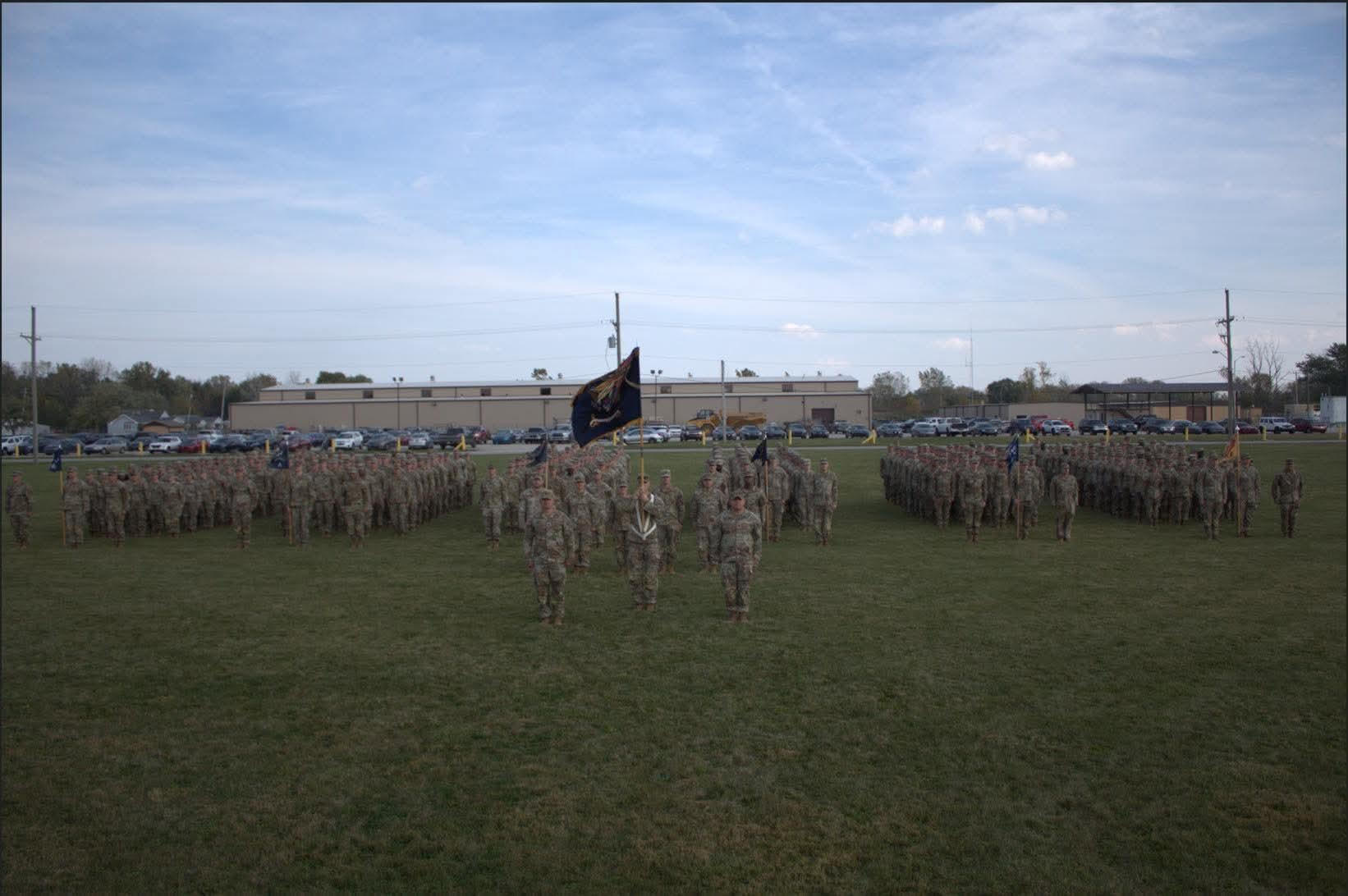
The 1-148th Infantry Regiment Battalion Photo at Camp Perry, OH October 2025

The years of the American Civil War brought several antecedents of the 148th Infantry Regiment, namely the 2nd Ohio Infantry Regiment and the 6th Ohio Infantry Regiment. The 16th Infantry Regiment was formed in the area of Ohio now being served by the 148th Infantry.

=== Battle of Antietam - American Civil War 1862 ===
At Antietam, near Sharpsburg, Md., Union troops under Maj. Gen. George McClellan fought Gen. Robert E. Lee's invading army to a standstill. Ohio contributed 11 infantry regiments, two batteries of artillery and an independent cavalry company to the battle. Today, the 148th Infantry Regiment (4th Ohio), 174th Air Defense Artillery Regiment (5th Ohio), 107th Cavalry Regiment (7th Ohio) and 145th Armored Regiment (7th Ohio) display the Antietam campaign streamer on their colors.

=== Spanish-American War 1898 ===
The 16th Ohio Regiment was ordered back on active duty as the 6th Ohio and moving once again to the deep South and within a year was moving by foot, rail and ship to Cienfuegos, Cuba and Trinidad. In the years following, men from the 2nd and 6th Ohio Regiments served in the Philippine insurrection and the Boxer uprising.

=== Great Dayton Flood 1913 ===
The 148th Infantry Regiment was activated for peacetime service to Dayton, OH during the catastrophic Great Dayton Flood of 1913.

=== Battle of Columbus, New Mexico 1916 ===
The year 1916 brought Pancho Villa's raid on Columbus, New Mexico. On 14 July 1916, the 3rd Infantry, Ohio National Guard, direct predecessor of the 148th Infantry, was mustered into federal service and rushed to duty on the Mexican border at El Paso, Texas. There, the Guardsmen received the training which was soon to be put to its most severe test to date. Several units were never mustered out of service from border duty but were sent directly to camps for additional training. It was on 15 September 1917 that the 3rd Ohio was redesignated the 148th Infantry, 74th Brigade, 37th Infantry Division.

=== 1917 and World War I ===
During World War I, the 148th Infantry fought for three months on the front lines at Baccarat and the Pannes in the Meuse-Argonne and Ypres-Lys offenses at Recicourt and Avocourt, resulting in a victory for the allied troops. On 2 November 1918, during the Ypres-Lys campaign, the 148th crossed the Scheldt River in Belgium despite heavy losses from machine gun and shell fire. This crossing inspired their regimental motto, "We'll do it."

Among the more distinguished members of the 148th was Private Wilk Gunckle, Company M, 148th Infantry, recipient of the Distinguished Service Cross for his extraordinary heroism near Heurne, Belgium on 3 November 1918. According to the postwar attestation by the Adjutant-General, "He volunteered and guided ammunition carriers to advanced positions, despite the fact that he was seriously wounded in the face, which made it necessary to hold a bandage in place during the journey to and from the front. After receiving treatment at the first-aid station he returned to his duties."

With the signing of the Armistice, the 148th stayed on in Europe for several months before it returned to the United States and was demobilized. 1 July 1921 the 148th Infantry was reorganized as such. It was on 27 September 1923 that the 148th Infantry regimental insignia was approved – the first in the United States to receive official War Department sanction.

The crest has seventeen (17) silver arrows, banded by a sprig of buckeye on a wreath of blue and gold, which are the regimental colors. The seventeen arrows signify Ohio, which was the seventeenth state to be admitted to the Union. The shield is azure, for infantry, divided by a red fess, bordered by two gold bands with two fleurs-de-lis representing the offensive and defensive actions in which the regiment participated in France. The lion represents Belgium, where the regiment engaged in the Ypres-Lys offensive. The red fess, wavy and bordered by the two gold bands, represents the Scheldt River which, of all the allied troops, was crossed first by the 148th Infantry on 2 November 1918. The regimental motto, "We'll Do It," inscribed below the shield was inspired during this crossing and became a battle cry that inspired the members of this regiment to rise above the normal call of duty and to go on to soundly defeat an enemy of superior numbers and to bring about a great victory for the allies.

The 148th Infantry arrived at the port of New York on 23 March 1919 on the troopship SS Noordam and was demobilized 19 April 1919 at Camp Sherman, Ohio. Per the National Defense Act of 1920

=== Reconstitution and Stateside Missions 1921-1939 ===
The 148th Infantry was reconstituted in the National Guard in 1921, assigned to the 37th Division, and allotted to the state of Ohio. It was reorganized 1 July 1921 by redesignation of the 2nd Infantry, Ohio National Guard (organized 1919–21; headquarters organized 23 March 1921 and federally recognized at Toledo, Ohio) as the 148th Infantry. During a F4 tornado in 1924, the 148th Infantry was dispatched to Lorain, OH and Sandusky, OH within nine hours to help with rescue work, caring for the injured, guarding property and protecting against vandalism. The regimental headquarters relocated successively as follows: to Canton, Ohio, in 1926; to Toledo, in January 1929, to Columbus, Ohio, 1 December 1937. The regiment, or elements thereof, called up to perform the following state duties: riot control during a coal miners’ strike at Cadiz, Ohio, 20 July–17 August 1932; riot control during a workers’ strike at the Auto-Lite plant at Toledo, 23 May–2 June 1934; flood relief along the Ohio River, January–March 1937; riot control during a workers’ strike at the Mahoning Valley steel plants, 22 June–15 July 1937. Conducted annual summer training most years at Camp Perry, Ohio, 1921–39.

=== World War II ===
15 October 1940 found the 148th Infantry, as part of the 37th Division, back in active federal service and training in the deep South at Camp Shelby. Shortly after its arrival at its training station, the 148th received a large number of selective service personnel and started a long training program designed to make it one of the finest fighting units in the U.S. Army. After 16 months of rigorous training, the unit moved to Indiantown Gap and finished off its pre-embarkation training designed for European service. With the Japanese sweeping to seemingly easy victories against undermanned Pacific defenses, the 37th was rushed to the Islands to set up a series of island defenses designed to stop the advances and island hopping of the Japanese. The 148th landed at Suva, Fiji Islands, in early June 1942 and immediately set up a long coastal defense on the western part of Viti Levu. This program, coupled with vigorous jungle training, fitted the 148th for its baptism of fire on New Georgia. July 1943 found the 148th under command of Col. Stuart A. Baxter fighting the best Japanese had to offer in the battle for Munda airstrip. It took only one campaign and the veterans of the 148th could be proud of this new fighting unit. Lt. Col. Delbert Schultz took the 3rd Battalion on a special mission with a Marine raider force and hit the Japanese at Bairoko Harbor and fought their way through some of the toughest terrain in the Solomon Islands to tie up with the remainder of the 148th in the final push for the airstrip.

After but a brief rest unloading ships at Guadalcanal, the 148th was again to lead the way for the 37th and follow the 3rd Marine Division into Bougainville. Once the perimeter defenses were set, it was a matter of marking time until the Japanese 6th Division hit. Early March 1944 found them doing just that, making a penetration of the 145th lines near Hill 700. The 2nd Battalion, under the command of Lt. Col. (now Col.) Herbert W. Radcliffe, was ordered to counter-attack and drive the Japanese from the Hill. After a brief but bloody battle, the 2nd Battalion restored the lines. Within a week the 2nd Battalion again was called upon to back up the 129th Infantry in its sector. For their heroic and courageous efforts, three units of the 148th Infantry received the Presidential Unit Citation.

The 148th push ashore at Lingayen Gulf, Luzon Island, on January 9, 1945 "Luzon Day" saw the and heading toward Manila. To the veterans of the 148th, there can be no doubt as to which unit reached Manila first. Along the way such strongholds as Clark Field, Fort Stotensburg and Santa Tomas had to be neutralized. Following the fall of Manila, the 148th pushed on toward Balete Pass and thence onward to Baguio and the fall of the summer capital. Before the 148th could catch their breath they were on the move again, this time up through the Cagayan Valley and moving toward Aparri before the Japanese finally surrendered.

=== End of World War II ===
From September to December 1945, the 148th performed occupational tasks in Luzon before they returned to the United States. Once more a job of reorganization followed the deactivation of the 37th Division back in Ohio. 15 January 1952 found the 148th back in the deep South, this time at Camp Polk, LA. The 148th Regiment was reorganized 1 April 1963 to consist only of the 1st Battalion, 148th Infantry (written 1-148th) an element of the 37th Infantry Division.

=== 11 September 2001 - 2002 Operation Noble Eagle ===
After 11 September 2001, A-D Companies of the 1-148 Infantry activated to federal active duty on 6 October 2001 and shipped to Ft. Knox, KY, for mobilization training and validation. HHC and E Companies soon followed, and activated to federal active duty on 15 October 2001. Prior to moving to Ft. Knox, KY, the battalion headquarters set up shop at Rickenbacker National Guard Base in Columbus, Ohio, from 24 September to 8 October 2001, in order to provide command and control over the mobilization. As of early 2002, the 148th Infantry was standing guard over American federal installations on its home soil, across the Mid-West region of the United States, in support of Operation Noble Eagle.

=== Operation Joint Guardian - Kosovo Defense 2004 ===
Under the command of Task Force Shield Commander Lieutenant Colonel Gordon L. Ellis. The 1-148th Infantry, Ohio Army National Guard was mobilized in June 2004 for four months of training prior to a six-month deployment to Kosovo as peacekeepers as part of Operation Joint Guardian rotation KFOR-6A. for the assignment on the NATO-led peacekeeping force in Kosovo. The soldiers trained for 3 months at Camp Atterbury, IN and then one month at Hohenfels, Bavaria, Germany. The soldiers arrived in Kosovo in August 2004 beginning their mission stationed at Camp Monteith, and Camp Bondsteel, in the MNB-East (Multi National Brigade) sector and returned in February 2005.

=== Hurricane Katrina and Hurricane Rita 2005 ===
As part of Task Force Buckeye, under the Command of Lieutenant Colonel Gordon L. Ellis. The 1-148th Infantry, Ohio Army National Guard was mobilized on 30 August 2005 and sent to New Orleans, LA. for Hurricane Katrina relief. The 1-148th IN was assigned to the Super Dome in order to install stability and facilitate the evacuation of all civilians. They returned in late September 2005.

=== Operation Iraqi Freedom 2007-2008 ===
The 1-148th was deployed in support of Operation Iraqi Freedom (OIF) 2007–2008. They were mobilized in January 2008 and trained for three months at Fort Hood TX, then they were sent to Camp Arifjan Kuwait and conducted convoy security and escort operations throughout Iraq and Kuwait. They returned in December 2008.

=== Operation Enduring Freedom 2011-2012 ===
In May 2010, the 1-148th Infantry Regiment was notified of a deployment to Afghanistan, scheduled to commence in the fall of 2011. To prepare for their impending deployment, they mobilized at Camp Shelby, Mississippi, where they conducted comprehensive premobilization training. The unit was assigned to RC-North Afghanistan to in suppoty of Operation Enduring Freedom.

=== War in Afghanistan 2011-2012 ===
Headquarters and Headquarters Company (Reaper Company), Company A (Apache Company), and Company C (Charlie Company) were entrusted with occupying the Forward Operating Base Griffin in Maimana, as well as the Combat Outposts Quasar and Ghormach. Their duties encompassed serving as the security force (SECFOR) assistance teams tasked with manning the base defense operations center, providing security detail during key leader engagements involving the Battalion Commander, and serving as the quick reaction force team. HHQ (Reaper Company), composed of two platoons and a small headquarters element, was assigned to FOB Griffin.

=== 4 April 2012 Suicide Bombing ===
On April 4, 2012, while operating in the city of Maimana, Faryab province, Afghanistan, First Platoon of Headquarters and Headquarters Company (Reaper Company) suffered an attack involving a Suicide Vehicle Borne Improvised Explosive Device (SVBIED). Three Soldiers died from the attack to include Capt. Nicholas J. Rozanski, 36, of Dublin, Ohio, Sgt. 1st Class Jeffrey J. Rieck, 45, of Columbus, Ohio, and Sgt. 1st Class Shawn T. Hannon, 44, of Grove City, Ohio. VFW Post 4931 in Columbus, OH was named in honor of CPT Nicholas J. Rozanski. Wounded were 1st Lt. Christopher Rosebrock of Hicksville, Ohio; Spc. Austin Weigle of Bryan, Ohio; Cpl. Everett Haworth of Olmsted Township, Ohio; and Pfc. Jacob Williams of Somerville, Ohio. The platoon's medic was among the five soldiers wounded in action. The incident caused more than 30 casualties in total. For their commendable service during Operation Enduring Freedom, each of Headquarters and Headquarters Company (Reaper Company), Company A (Apache Company), and Company C (Comanche Company) from the 1-148th Infantry Regiment received a Meritorious Unit Commendation.

During that time, Company C (Charlie Company), was stationed at the remote Operating Base Ghormach reported two soldiers wounded in action due to small arms fire during an attack on their outpost.

Company B (Bravo Company) and Company D (Delta Company) were incorporated into Task Force ROC under the NTM-A mission, tasked with executing missions across Afghanistan.

Following their service, the 1-148th Infantry Regiment demobilized at Camp Shelby, Mississippi, in the fall of 2012.

=== Operation Enduring Freedom - Jordan 2017 ===
In January 2017, about 360 Soldiers from the 148th were mobilized and conducted pre-deployment training at Fort Bliss, TX. The battalion deployed for nine months to Jordan in support of Operation Enduring Freedom and Operation Spartan Shield. The unit's primary mission was conducting training operations with the Jordanian Armed Forces.

=== COVID-19 Response 2020-2021 ===
An element of the 148th was assigned to assist with mission critical functions at the Marion Correctional Institution in Marion, OH covering shifts for COVID-positive guards due to the major outbreak at the time. Many of the Soldiers selected possessed a law enforcement background from their civilian professions. The unit was also assigned to support other COVID-19 relief efforts. Various elements and personnel were utilized for these taskings.

=== Civil Disturbance Response June 2020 ===
The 148th was activated for domestic civil disturbance operations to serve in the nation's capital while more than 32,400 National Guard members across the country were also tasked with assisting state and local law enforcements in support of civil unrest operations. National Guard Soldiers and Airmen from 10 states supported the DC National Guard in a combined effort to assist the Capitol Police and federal law enforcement. The 148th also served in the state of Ohio by assisting local authorities after three days of civil unrest in major Ohio cities.

=== 59th Presidential Inauguration Support January 2021 ===
In January 2021, the 148th was assigned to return to Washington, DC to conduct security, communication and logistical missions in support of federal and district authorities leading up and through the 59th Presidential Inauguration along with 25,000 National Guard members from across the U.S. The 148th assumed responsibility of securing around the nation's capital building footprint along with other critical infrastructure within the District of Columbia.

=== Operation Inherent Resolve ===
In September 2022, the 148th was mobilized under 37th Infantry Brigade Combat Team and Combined Joint Task Force – Operation Inherent Resolve with the mission ensure a lasting defeat of Daesh in Iraq and Syria. As part of this mission the 148th was tasked with advising, assisting, and enabling partner forces to maintain the enduring defeat of Daesh in the region. The 148th provided regional partner forces the access to training and assistance, advised partner forces, served as operational support to combat malign actors, promoted stability, and improved partner nations’ ability to respond to any crisis. Companies from the 148th were split across Iraq, Syria, and Kuwait. The 148th was assigned Security Forces (SECFOR) missions and Quick Reaction Forces (QRF) to respond to threats in the Area of Operations.

=== Unit Decorations ===
| Ribbon | Award |
|---|---|
| | Meritorious Unit Citation (with oak leak cluster) (Army) |
| Army PUC | Presidential Unit Citation (Army) |
| | Army Superior Unit Award (Army) |

== Heraldry ==
=== Coat of arms ===
==== Heraldic description ====
- Shield: Azure, a fess wavy Gules fimbriated Or, between two fleurs-de-lis in chief and a rampant lion in base of the last.
- Crest: From a wreath Or and Azure, a sheaf of seventeen arrows Argent, bound by a sprig of buckeye (aesculus glabra) fructed Proper (two leaves bursting burr).
- Motto: WE'LL DO IT

==== Symbolism ====
The shield is blue for Infantry divided by a wavy fess of red, bordered by two gold bands, representing the Escaut River in Belgium, which the regiment, under heavy fire, was the first of the Allied Troops to cross during World War I, costing the lives of many men, but held in the face of concentrated artillery fire and in the face of counterattacks. Two gold fleurs-de-lis, taken from the ancient French Arms denote service in France, the holding of two sectors in that country, the gold lion rampant is taken from the arms of Belgium and denotes service in that country in the Ypres-Lys offensive. At the time of the crossing of the Escaut River, the units attempting the act were just a little doubtful as to how a swift river could be crossed without pontoons. Lieutenant Colonel Marlin, then Major Marlin, reminded them of a certain ceremony that was to be performed on reaching the Rhine, and with the catch phrase "We'll Do It," the soldiers fell to work, cut down a tree across the Escaut and crossed, single file, over the tree.

==== Background ====
The coat of arms was approved on 21 April 1923.

=== In popular culture ===
Starship Troopers book and movie by the same name references the 1-148 Infantry Regiment in the naming of the fictional corvette transport "Rodger Young" after real life Medal of Honor recipient Rodger Wilton Young.

Dodgeball: A True Underdog Story makes subtle reference to the parent unit of the 1-148 Infantry Regiment with Rip Torn as Patches O'Houlihan, a retired seven-time ADAA dodgeball All-Star, who not uses a wheelchair, wearing a leather jacket adorned with the 37th Infantry Division unit shoulder patch insignia.

== See also ==
- 2nd Ohio Infantry
- 3rd Ohio Infantry
- 4th Ohio Infantry
- 6th Ohio Infantry
- 16th Ohio Infantry
- 37th Infantry Division
- 37th Infantry Brigade Combat Team
