= Ted Risenhoover =

American politician

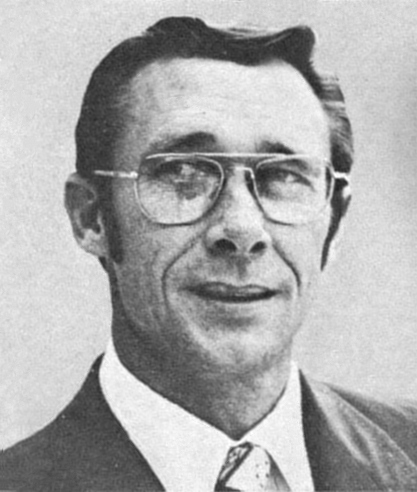

Member of the U.S. House of Representatives from Oklahoma's 2nd district
- In office January 3, 1975 – January 3, 1979
- Preceded by: Clem McSpadden
- Succeeded by: Mike Synar

Personal details
- Born: Theodore Marshall Risenhoover; November 3, 1934 Haskell County, Oklahoma, U.S.
- Died: September 10, 2006 (aged 71) Claremore, Oklahoma, U.S.
- Party: Democratic
- Education: University of Alabama; Northeastern State College

Military service
- Allegiance: United States
- Branch/service: United States Air Force
- Years of service: 1955–1963

Theodore Marshall Risenhoover (November 3, 1934 – September 10, 2006) was a community newspaper publisher and American politician representing northeastern Oklahoma in the United States House of Representatives for two terms during 1975–1979.

== Biography ==
Risenhoover was born in Haskell County, Oklahoma, in a town called East Liberty. He graduated from Stigler High School in Stigler, Oklahoma in 1952.

After his high school graduation, Risenhoover worked for Western Electric for three years before enlisting in the United States Air Force for an eight-year stint from 1955 to 1963. While in the military, he studied government and economics at the University of Alabama. With his discharge from the service in 1963, he returned to Oklahoma. Two years later he received a bachelor's degree in business administration from Northeastern State College in Tahlequah, Oklahoma. Married and divorced three times, he was the father of a son and a daughter. Risenhoover died on September 10, 2006, in Claremore, Oklahoma. He was buried at the Fort Gibson National Cemetery, Fort Gibson, Oklahoma.

== Career ==
Before his graduation from Northeastern State College, he became involved with the Pictorial Press, a small weekly newspaper in Tahlequah. As part owner and president, he reorganized this paper and also purchased the Tahlequah Star-Citizen. Known for his crime-fighting efforts, he charged that organized crime had infiltrated northeastern Oklahoma, and the Pictorial Press was bombed. For his efforts against crime, he was named to the Oklahoma Crime Commission and served from 1970 to 1974. He was a delegate to the Democratic National Mid-term Convention in 1974.

As a Democrat, Risenhoover was elected to the U.S. House of Representatives from Oklahoma's 2nd congressional district, assuming office on January 3, 1975. He served two terms in the House, then lost the 1978 Democratic nomination for his seat to Mike Synar after The Washington Post ran a lifestyle article about Risenhoover that mentioned he slept on a "heart shaped waterbed" and the Synar campaign seized the opportunity to question the incumbent's judgement by printing and widely distributing copies of the controversial news article. He left office on January 3, 1979.

Following his defeat, Risenhoover remained in Washington and worked at the Pentagon and later for the doorkeeper of the House of Representatives. Returning to Oklahoma in the early 1980s, he sold his newspaper business, and remained in northeastern Oklahoma holding a variety of jobs.

U.S. House of Representatives
Preceded by Clem McSpadden	Member of the U.S. House of Representatives from Oklahoma's 2nd congressional district 1975–1979	Succeeded by Mike Synar
