= Albert E. Baesel =

Albert Edward Baesel
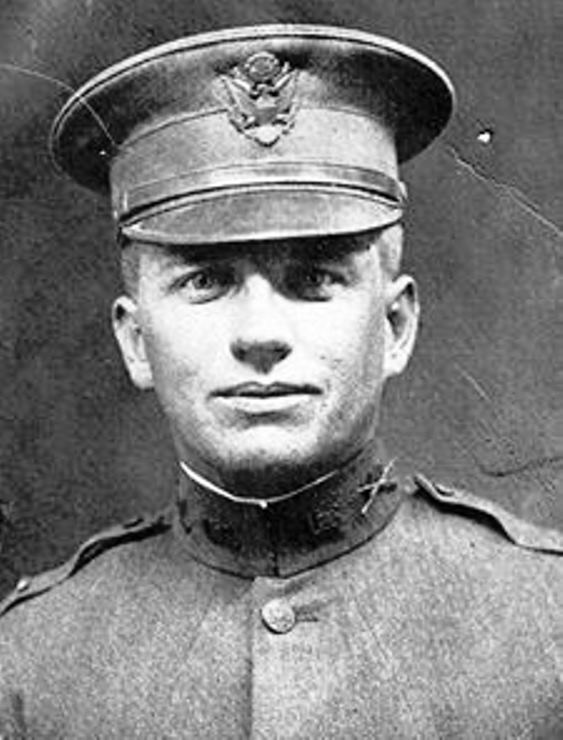
- Medal of Honor recipient
- Born: March 21, 1890; Berea, Ohio, U.S.
- Died: September 27, 1918 (aged 28) near Ivoiry, France
- Military career
- Allegiance: United States of America
- Branch: Ohio Army National Guard; United States Army
- Service years: 1912 - 1918
- Rank: Corporal (National Guard); Second Lieutenant (Army)
- Units: 148th Infantry Regiment, 37th Division
- Conflicts: World War I: Meuse-Argonne offensive †
- Awards: Medal of Honor

Albert Edward Baesel (March 21, 1890 – September 27, 1918) was an American Army officer who posthumously received the Medal of Honor for actions near Ivoiry, France which led to his death during World War I.

== Birth and early service ==
Baesel was born in Berea, Ohio. He joined the 5th Infantry Regiment of the Ohio National Guard in 1912 as a private and later promoted to Corporal in the Ohio National Guard. In 1918, he resigned from the 5th Infantry and was commissioned as a Second Lieutenant in the 148th Infantry Regiment of the Ohio National Guard. That same year, the 148th was federalized to serve in France.

== Medal of Honor citation ==
Upon hearing that a squad leader of his platoon had been severely wounded while attempting to capture an enemy machine-gun nest about 200 yards in advance of the assault line and somewhat to the right, 2d Lt. Baesel requested permission to go to the rescue of the wounded corporal. After thrice repeating his request and permision [sic] having been reluctantly given, due to the heavy artillery, rifle, and machine-gun fire, and heavy deluge of gas in which the company was at the time, accompanied by a volunteer, he worked his way forward, and reaching the wounded man, placed him upon his shoulders and was instantly killed by enemy fire.

== American Legion ==
A chartered American Legion post was named in his honor at a welcome-home celebration held in Berea on July 4, 1919.

== See also ==
- List of Medal of Honor recipients
- List of Medal of Honor recipients for World War I
