= Jack C. Montgomery =

Native American U.S. Army officer, Medal of Honor recipient (1917–2002)

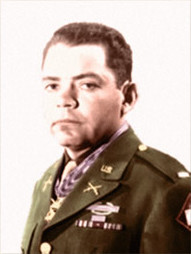
- 1Lt Montgomery in 1945 after receiving his Medal of Honor
- Born: July 23, 1917; Long, Oklahoma, US
- Died: June 11, 2002 (aged 84); Muskogee, Oklahoma, US
- Burial place: Fort Gibson National Cemetery, Oklahoma, US
- Military career
- Allegiance: United States
- Branch: United States Army
- Service years: 1937–1945
- Rank: First Lieutenant
- Units: 3rd Battalion, 180th Infantry Regiment, 45th Infantry Division
- Conflicts: World War II
- Awards: Medal of Honor; Silver Star; Purple Heart (2)

Jack Cleveland Montgomery (July 23, 1917 – June 11, 2002) was a United States Army officer, a citizen of the Cherokee Nation, and a recipient of the United States military's highest decoration—the Medal of Honor—for his actions in World War II.

Montgomery attended Chilocco Indian Agricultural School in Northern Oklahoma before transferring to Carnegie Highschool. He is one of three graduates from Chilocco to have earned the Medal of Honor, making the Chilocco School one of the smallest schools in the United States to have graduated so many Medal of Honor recipients. After graduating in 1936, he enrolled at Bacone College and enlisted in the Oklahoma National Guard. In 1938, Montgomery transferred to Redlands University in California. He returned to Oklahoma in 1940. After the attack on Pearl Harbor, he reenlisted in the Army and served with his old unit, the 180th Infantry Regiment, 45th Infantry Division, through the duration of World War II.

In February 1944, Jack Montgomery was a First Lieutenant in I Company of the 180th Regiment. While defending the beachhead at Anzio, Lt. Montgomery's platoon came under fire from three fortified German positions. Lt. Montgomery single-handedly assaulted those positions with covering fire from artillery and his men. His actions that day earned him the Medal of Honor. Later in the day, Montgomery was wounded by mortar fire and taken to the field hospital on the Anzio beach. He was evacuated back to the United States, where he recovered and returned to service with a training Army in Texas. He was serving there when he received his medal from President Franklin Delano Roosevelt.

Jack Montgomery left the service in 1945 and spent the rest of his life in Oklahoma. For his service during World War II, Jack Montgomery was awarded the Medal of Honor, two Silver Stars, and two Purple Hearts. He died at the age of eighty-four and is buried in the Fort Gibson National Cemetery. The Veterans Health Administration medical center in Muskogee, Oklahoma, is named his honor.

== Medal of Honor citation ==
First Lieutenant Montgomery's official Medal of Honor citation reads:

For conspicuous gallantry and intrepidity at risk of life above and beyond the call of duty on February 22, 1944, near Padiglione, Italy. Two hours before daybreak a strong force of enemy infantry established themselves in 3 echelons at 50 yards, 100 yards, and 300 yards, respectively, in front of the rifle platoons commanded by 1st Lt. Montgomery. The closest position, consisting of 4 machineguns and 1 mortar, threatened the immediate security of the platoon position. Seizing an M1 rifle and several hand grenades, 1st Lt. Montgomery crawled up a ditch to within hand grenade range of the enemy. Then climbing boldly onto a little mound, he fired his rifle and threw his grenades so accurately that he killed 8 of the enemy and captured the remaining 4. Returning to his platoon, he called for artillery fire on a house, in and around which he suspected that the majority of the enemy had entrenched themselves. Arming himself with a carbine, he proceeded along the shallow ditch, as withering fire from the riflemen and machinegunners in the second position was concentrated on him. He attacked this position with such fury that 7 of the enemy surrendered to him, and both machineguns were silenced. Three German dead were found in the vicinity later that morning. 1st Lt. Montgomery continued boldly toward the house, 300 yards from his platoon position. It was now daylight, and the enemy observation was excellent across the flat open terrain which led to 1st Lt. Montgomery's objective. When the artillery barrage had lifted, 1st Lt. Montgomery ran fearlessly toward the strongly defended position. As the enemy started streaming out of the house, 1st Lt. Montgomery, unafraid of treacherous snipers, exposed himself daringly to assemble the surrendering enemy and send them to the rear. His fearless, aggressive, and intrepid actions that morning, accounted for a total of 11 enemy dead, 32 prisoners, and an unknown number of wounded. That night, while aiding an adjacent unit to repulse a counterattack, he was struck by mortar fragments and seriously wounded. The selflessness and courage exhibited by 1st Lt. Montgomery in alone attacking 3 strong enemy positions inspired his men to a degree beyond estimation.

== Awards and decorations ==

Badge	Combat Infantryman Badge		
1st row	Medal of Honor	Silver Star with 1 Oak leaf cluster	Bronze Star Medal
2nd row	Purple Heart with 1 Oak leaf cluster	Army Good Conduct Medal	American Defense Service Medal
3rd row	American Campaign Medal	European–African–Middle Eastern Campaign Medal with 2 Campaign stars	World War II Victory Medal

== See also ==
- List of Medal of Honor recipients
- List of Medal of Honor recipients for World War II
