= Robert M. Viale =

United States Army Medal of Honor recipient (1916–1945)

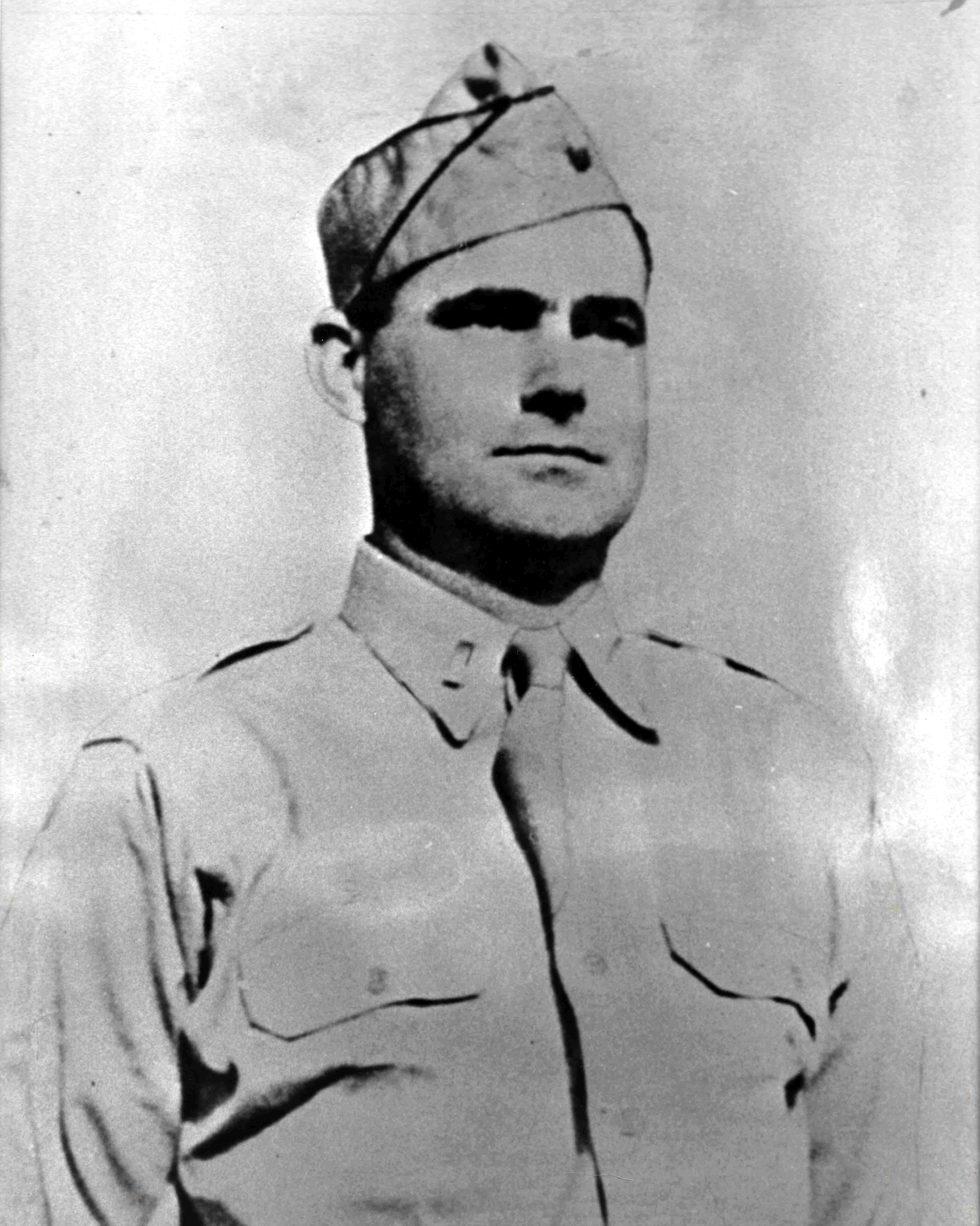
- Army commissioning picture circa 1941
- Born: April 21, 1916; Bayside, California, US
- Died: February 5, 1945 (aged 28); Manila, Philippines
- Burial place: Ocean View Cemetery, Eureka, California
- Military career
- Allegiance: United States of America
- Branch: United States Army
- Service years: 1941 – 1945
- Rank: Second Lieutenant
- Units: 148th Infantry Regiment, 37th Infantry Division
- Conflicts: World War II: Battle of Manila †
- Awards: Medal of Honor

Robert M. Viale (April 21, 1916 – February 5, 1945) was a United States Army officer and a recipient of the United States military's highest decoration—the Medal of Honor—for his actions in World War II.

Viale joined the Army from Ukiah, California in March 1941, and by February 5, 1945 was serving as a second lieutenant in Company K, 148th Infantry Regiment, 37th Infantry Division. On that day, during combat in Manila, capital of the Philippines, Viale smothered the blast of an accidentally dropped hand grenade with his body, sacrificing himself to protect the soldiers and civilians around him. For his actions, he was posthumously awarded the Medal of Honor eight months later, on October 25, 1945.

Viale, aged 28 at his death, was buried in Ocean View Cemetery, Eureka, California.

== Medal of Honor citation ==
Viale's official Medal of Honor citation reads:

He displayed conspicuous gallantry and intrepidity above and beyond the call of duty. Forced by the enemy's detonation of prepared demolitions to shift the course of his advance through the city, he led the 1st platoon toward a small bridge, where heavy fire from 3 enemy pillboxes halted the unit. With 2 men he crossed the bridge behind screening grenade smoke to attack the pillboxes. The first he knocked out himself while covered by his men's protecting fire; the other 2 were silenced by 1 of his companions and a bazooka team which he had called up. He suffered a painful wound in the right arm during the action. After his entire platoon had joined him, he pushed ahead through mortar fire and encircling flames. Blocked from the only escape route by an enemy machinegun placed at a street corner, he entered a nearby building with his men to explore possible means of reducing the emplacement. In 1 room he found civilians huddled together, in another, a small window placed high in the wall and reached by a ladder. Because of the relative positions of the window, ladder, and enemy emplacement, he decided that he, being left-handed, could better hurl a grenade than 1 of his men who had made an unsuccessful attempt. Grasping an armed grenade, he started up the ladder. His wounded right arm weakened, and, as he tried to steady himself, the grenade fell to the floor. In the 5 seconds before the grenade would explode, he dropped down, recovered the grenade and looked for a place to dispose of it safely. Finding no way to get rid of the grenade without exposing his own men or the civilians to injury or death, he turned to the wall, held it close to his body and bent over it as it exploded. 2d Lt. Viale died in a few minutes, but his heroic act saved the lives of others.

== Additional Honors ==
A small arms firing range at Ohio National Guard Training Site, Camp Perry, Ohio, is named in honor of Viale. Camp Perry is the home of the National Rifle and Pistol Championships.

At Camp Roberts in California, a grenade range is named after Viale. His citation is written on the grenade range sign.

== See also ==
- List of Medal of Honor recipients
- List of Medal of Honor recipients for World War II
