= Battle of Fort Gibson =

Battle of the American Civil War

- Part of the American Civil War
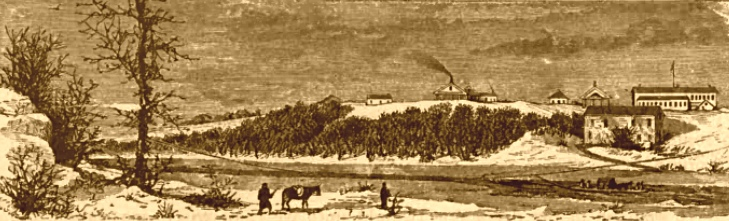
- Fort Gibson (c.1875)
| Date | May 20, 1863 |
| Location | Fort Gibson, Indian Territory |
| Result | Union victory |

Belligerents
| United States (Union) | (Confederate States of America) CSA (Confederacy) |

Commanders and leaders
| William A. Phillips | John T. Coffee; Daniel McIntosh |

Units involved
| Indian Home Guard | 3 regiments |

Casualties and losses
| 26 | unknown |

== Background ==
In April 1863 Union forces of the Indian Home Guard under Colonel William A. Phillips occupied Fort Gibson. Upon hearing reports of no Confederate activity in all directions Philips sent the fort's livestock to graze. A Union sentry failed to scout a mountain road and Confederate forces therefore descended on the livestock.

== Battle ==
Unwilling to move against the fort directly the Confederates maintained a strong position 5 miles away along the Arkansas River. Colonel Phillips dispatched his available mounted forces against the Confederates which succeeded in retaking most of the livestock. The Confederates made a strong attack against the Union sortie and were able to drive them back nearly surrounding two companies. Colonel Phillips then personally led a force of infantry with an artillery battery from the fort. Reinforced by the mounted infantry already in the field, Phillips was able to stop the Rebel attack. The Confederates held briefly in a forest until they were routed and withdrew beyond the Arkansas River. Phillips dispatched his cavalry to give chase to this Confederate force. Meanwhile, word was received of a second Confederate force attempting a river crossing. Phillips returned to the fort with the infantry and artillery to counter this feint. The Rebels fired one volley and withdrew having failed to draw away enough Union forces from the original Confederate attack on the livestock.

== Aftermath ==
Eight days later Colonel Phillips' supply train was attacked at Fort Gibson. Phillips successfully defeated the attack and saved the supply train. In July 1863 troops from Fort Gibson marched south to win the battle of Honey Springs. Fort Gibson would remain in Union control for the rest of the war.
