= William A. Phillips =

American politician

William Addison Phillips
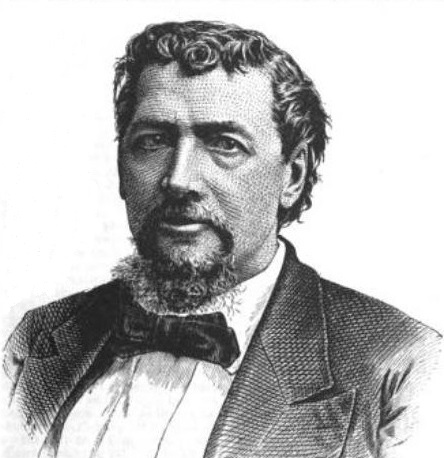

Member of the U.S. House of Representatives from Kansas
- In office March 4, 1873 – March 3, 1879
- Preceded by: David P. Lowe (AL); District established (1st)
- Succeeded by: District eliminated (AL); John A. Anderson (1st)
- Constituency: At-large district (1873-75); 1st district (1875-79)

Member of the Kansas House of Representatives
- In office 1865

Personal details
- Born: January 14, 1824 Paisley, Scotland
- Died: November 30, 1893 (aged 69) Fort Gibson, Oklahoma
- Resting place: Salina, Kansas
- Party: Republican

Military service
- Allegiance: United States
- Branch/service: Union Army
- Years of service: 1862–1865
- Rank: Colonel
- Unit: 3rd Indian Home Guard
- Battles/wars: American Civil War: Battle of Old Fort Wayne; Battle of Cane Hill; Battle of Prairie Grove; Battle of Fort Gibson; Battle of Honey Springs

William Addison Phillips (1824–1893) was a Free-State Abolitionist journalist during the "Bleeding Kansas" period. He also served in the Civil War, ending the war as a colonel.

== Biography ==
Born in Paisley, Scotland, Phillips attended the common schools of Paisley. He immigrated to the United States in 1838 with his parents, who settled in Randolph County, Illinois. He engaged in agricultural pursuits. He was employed as a newspaper correspondent 1845–1862. He studied law. He was admitted to the bar in 1855 and commenced practice in Lawrence, Kansas, working also as a correspondent for the New York Tribune. He was first justice of the Kansas Supreme Court under the Leavenworth Constitution. In 1858, he settled and founded the city of Salina, Kansas with a wagon circle against constant threat by hostile tribes. During the American Civil War, though offered a large sum to be a correspondent at the front, he entered the Union Army as a volunteer, and raised some of the first troops in Kansas in 1861. He was a major in the 1st Indian Home Guard. He was promoted to colonel and served as commander of the Cherokee Indian Regiment in the 3rd Indian Home Guard. He served as prosecuting attorney of Cherokee County in 1865. He served in the state House of Representatives in 1865.

He was elected as a Republican to the Forty-third, Forty-fourth, and Forty-fifth Congresses (March 4, 1873 – March 3, 1879). He was an unsuccessful candidate for renomination in 1878. After leaving Congress, he was attorney for the Cherokee Indians at Washington, D.C. He was an unsuccessful candidate for election to Congress in 1890. He died at Fort Gibson, Muskogee County, Indian Territory (now Oklahoma), November 30, 1893. He was interred in Gypsum Hill Cemetery, Salina, Kansas.

The city of Phillipsburg, Kansas was named in honor William A. Phillips.

U.S. House of Representatives		Member of the U.S. House of Representatives from Kansas's at-large congressional district 1873–1875	Incumbent
Member of the U.S. House of Representatives from Kansas's 1st congressional district 1875–1879	Succeeded by John A. Anderson		
