= Mike Synar =

American politician

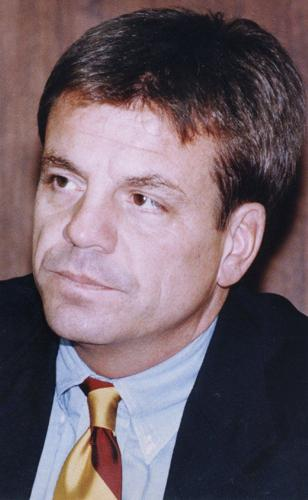

Member of the U.S. House of Representatives from Oklahoma's 2nd district
- In office January 3, 1979 – January 3, 1995
- Preceded by: Ted Risenhoover
- Succeeded by: Tom Coburn

Personal details
- Born: Michael Lynn Synar; October 17, 1950 Vinita, Oklahoma, U.S.
- Died: January 9, 1996 (aged 45) Washington, D.C., U.S.
- Party: Democratic
- Education: University of Oklahoma (BS, LLB); University of Edinburgh; Northwestern University (MA)

Michael Lynn Synar (October 17, 1950 – January 9, 1996) was an American Democratic politician who represented Oklahoma's 2nd congressional district in Congress for eight terms.

== Early life and career ==
Synar was born in Vinita, Oklahoma, His father, Ed Synar, was a World War II B-24 tailgunner in Europe. His father's family line was Polish Catholics. Mike Synar was graduated from Muskogee High School in 1968. He attended the University of Oklahoma (OU) and graduated in 1972 with a B.S.; later Synar also earned his J.D. degree from the University of Oklahoma College of Law in 1977. While Synar was studying at the University of Oklahoma, he was a member of Oklahoma Intercollegiate Legislature. Synar was also a Rotary International Scholar and attended the Graduate School of Economics at the University of Edinburgh (in Scotland) in 1973, and earned an M.A. from Northwestern University in 1974.

While Synar's primary profession was the practice of law, he also worked as a rancher and a real estate broker/agent in the Muskogee area.

== Election and service in Congress ==
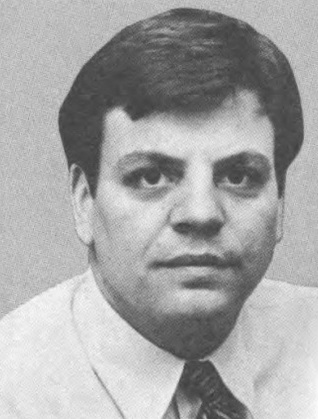
Synar's congressional portrait

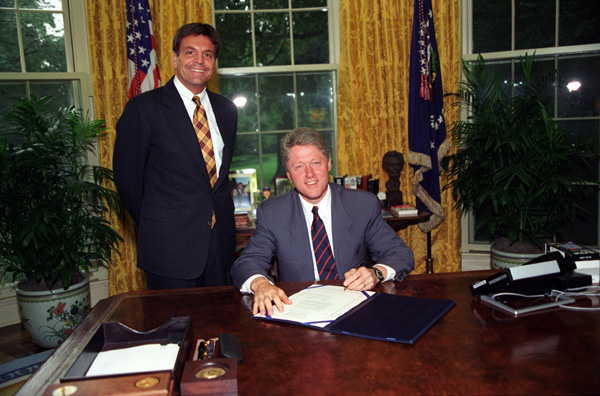
Synar with President Bill Clinton in 1993

He was first elected to Congress in 1978 at the age of 28, by defeating incumbent Ted Risenhoover. Synar's campaign pulled off an upset victory as they circulated copies of a Washington D.C. media report that said Risenhoover slept on a "heart-shaped waterbed," which did not play well with the voters back home in Oklahoma.

Unlike most Oklahoma Democrats, Synar held liberal views politically. In the Congress, he may be best known for his successful constitutional challenge to the Gramm–Rudman Act. In the 1986 Supreme Court decision Bowsher v. Synar, the Court struck down the law stating, in part, that the provision granting executive power to Comptroller General Charles Arthur Bowsher, a legislative branch officer, did "violate the Constitution's command that Congress play no direct role in the execution of the laws." Synar was also an ardent and persistent foe of the tobacco industry.

A major issue for Synar involved low fees charged ranchers who grazed cattle on public lands. The "animal unit month" (AUM) fee was only $1.35 and was far below the 1983 market value. The argument was that the federal government in effect was subsidizing ranchers, with a few major corporations controlling millions of acres of grazing land. Working with Interior Secretary Bruce Babbitt, Synar tried to rally environmentalists and raise fees, but senators from Western states successfully blocked their proposals.

Despite having no criminal prosecution experience, in 1989 Synar served as the lead House manager as Congress conducted an impeachment trial of then-U.S. federal judge Alcee Hastings, who had been acquitted by a jury in a criminal trial but later impeached on bribery charges but was removed from the bench in his impeachment trial. Ironically, Hastings was later elected to the U.S. Congress from Florida, and re-elected 14 times becoming the dean of the Florida congressional delegation in 30 years in office. Hastings later was in line to chair the House Select Committee on Intelligence, but was passed over by Speaker Nancy Pelosi.

In 1992, the House Committee on Government Operations issued its 17th report, known colloquially as "the Synar Report", but formally as "Misplaced Trust: The Bureau of Indian Affairs Mismanagement of the Indian Trust Fund." Synar was Chairman of the Environment, Energy, and Natural Resources Subcommittee, which produced the report for the Committee on Government Operations (Chairman, John Conyers Jr.) at the direction of the 102nd Congress. The Synar Report led to the passage of the Indian Trust Fund Management Reform Act of 1994, and helped to pave the way for the class action lawsuit, Cobell v. Babbitt, initiated in 1996.

In 1994, Synar was narrowly defeated in a Democratic primary runoff election by Virgil Cooper, a retired high school principal. Though Cooper's campaign spent less than $20,000 itself, some money was spent by outside interests that were opposed to Synar, including the National Rifle Association of America, tobacco companies, and cattlemen. Cooper seized on Synar's connections with Japanese businesses with a bumper sticker slogan of "Sayonara Synar."

Cooper won by just 2,609 votes out of 92,987 cast, a 51–49 margin. Cooper was subsequently defeated in the general election by Republican Tom Coburn by a 52–48 margin.

== After Congress ==
After Congress, Synar served as the Chairman of the Campaign for America Project and of the National Bankruptcy Review Commission.

He was also awarded the 1995 John F. Kennedy Profile in Courage Award.

Synar died of a brain tumor on January 9, 1996, at the age of 45. The American College of Physicians offers a national public service award in honor of Rep. Synar's public efforts against tobacco smoking. His name is also attached to the 40,000-square-foot (3,700 m^{2}) Mike Synar Center at Northeastern State University in Muskogee, Oklahoma. The Institute of Governmental Studies at UC Berkeley annually awards up to five graduate research fellowships in honor of Rep. Synar to distinguished graduate students who are writing their dissertations on an aspect of American politics.

== See also ==
- List of notable brain tumor patients
- Oklahoma Democratic Party
- Oklahoma's congressional delegations
- Oklahoma's congressional districts
- Politics of Oklahoma

U.S. House of Representatives
Preceded by Ted Risenhoover	Member of the U.S. House of Representatives from Oklahoma's 2nd congressional district 1979–1995	Succeeded by Tom Coburn
