= Arbuckle Island =

Island in Arkansas

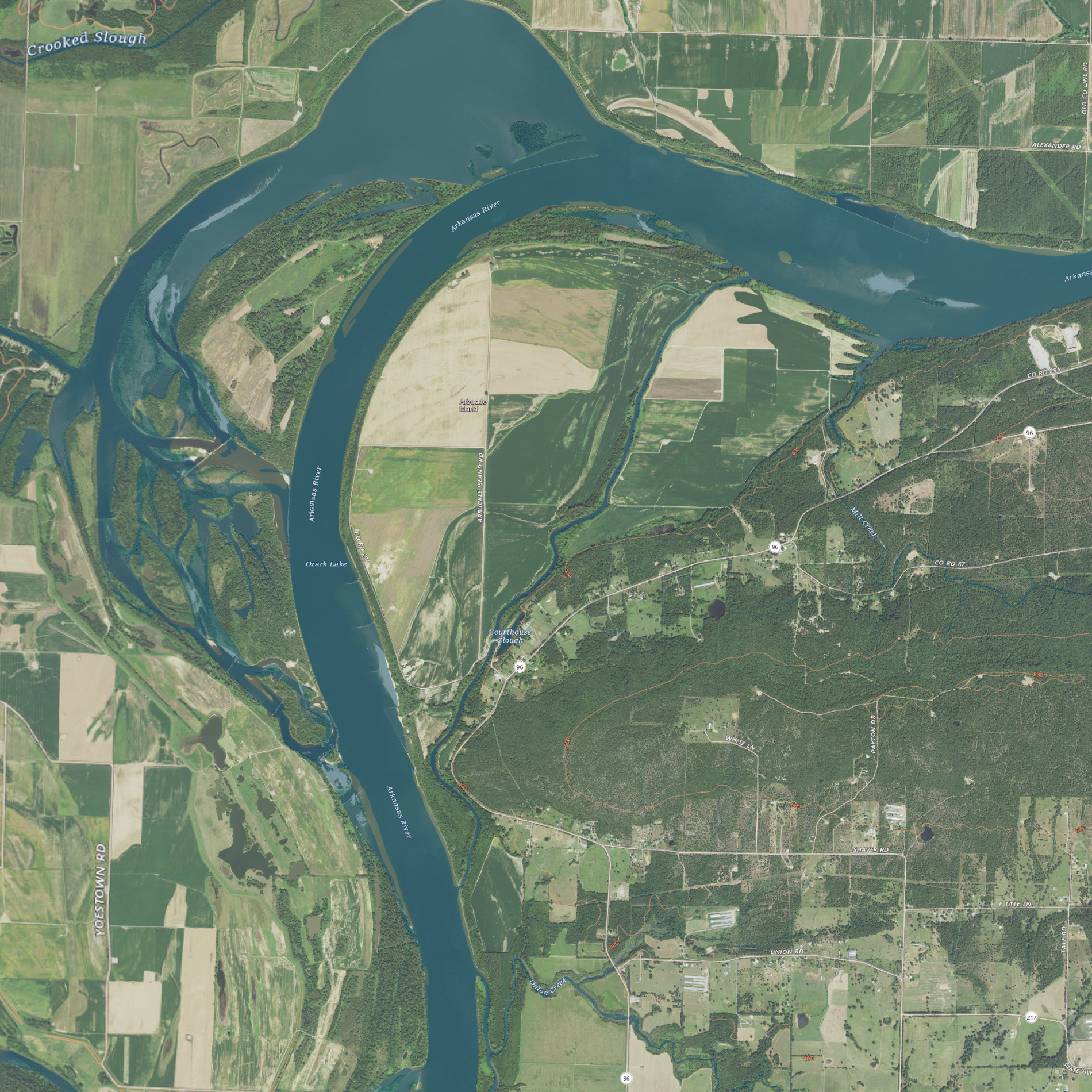
- USGS aerial imagery of Arbuckle Island

- Location within Arkansas Location within the United States

Geography
- Location: Arkansas
- Coordinates: 35.4345325°N 94.1321504°W

Administration
- United States
- State: Arkansas
- County: Sebastian County

Arbuckle Island is a small island on the Arkansas River in Sebastian County, Arkansas, United States. It was named for Matthew Arbuckle Jr., a career soldier who once owned the island. The island was granted to him as part of more than 20,000 acres (8,100 ha) that he obtained at the end of his military career.
