= Fort Gibson National Cemetery =

Veterans cemetery in Muskogee County, Oklahoma

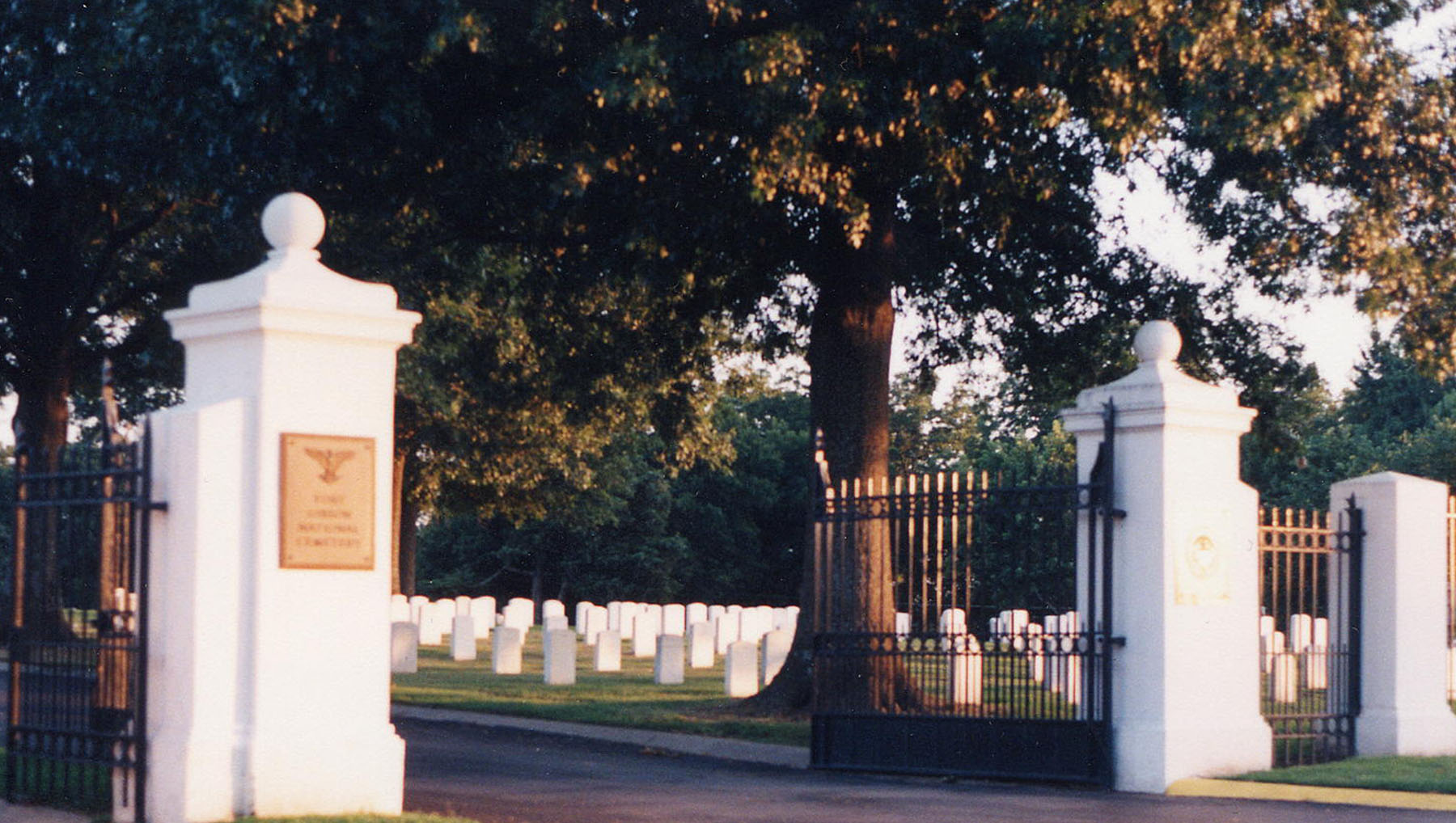
- The Podge Cast
- Interactive map of Fort Gibson National Cemetery

Details
- Location: 1423 Cemetery Road; Fort Gibson, Oklahoma
- Coordinates: 35°48′17″N 95°13′45″W
- Size: 48.3 acres (19.5 ha)
- No. of interments: >25,000 (2021)
- Find a Grave: Fort Gibson National Cemetery

Fort Gibson National Cemetery is a United States National Cemetery located inside of the town of Fort Gibson, in Muskogee County, Oklahoma. It encompasses 48.3 acres (19.5 ha), and as of 2021 had more than 25,000 interments.

== History ==
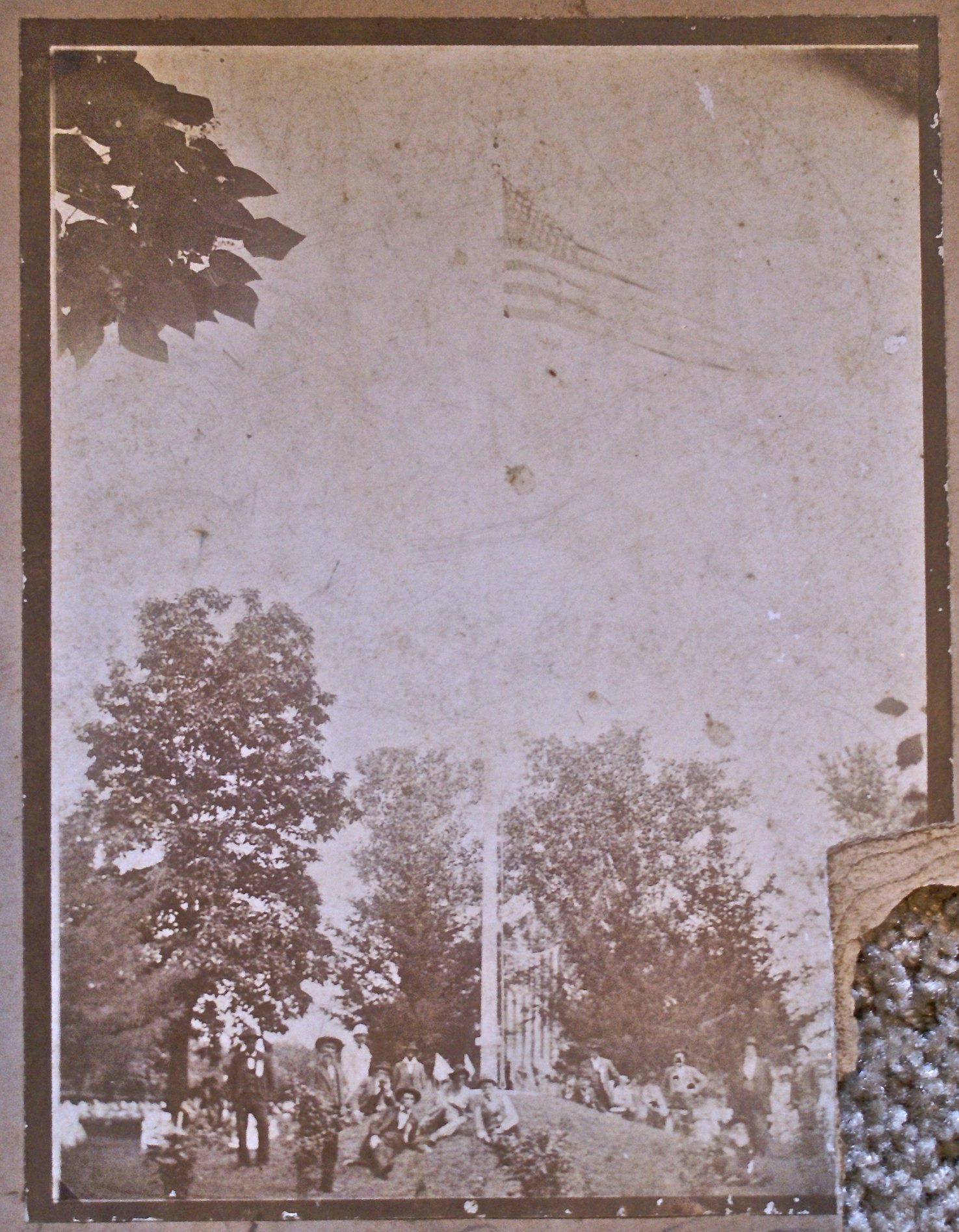
Cemetery flag pole circa. early 1900s

Fort Gibson was established in 1833, on a plot of land within the Cherokee nation. It is at what is considered to be the end of the Trail of Tears. Frontier life was hard, yellow fever was common, and at least three separate cemeteries were created between 1833 and 1857 when the Fort was abandoned.

In 1863 the Fort was remanned by Brigadier General James G. Blunt. In 1868 the National Cemetery was established in a 7-acre (2.8 ha) plot, and all of the nearby cemeteries had their interments transferred to it. This included the remains of many civilians.

Fort Gibson National Cemetery was placed on the National Register of Historic Places on May 20, 1999.

== Noteworthy monuments ==
- A cenotaph to Corporal John Haddo, Medal of Honor recipient for action in Montana Territory during the Indian Wars who is buried in a mass grave in Custer National Cemetery.

== Notable interments ==
=== Medal of Honor recipients ===
- John Haddoo (1851–1877), Indian Wars (cenotaph)
- First Lieutenant Jack C. Montgomery (1917–2002), recipient for action in World War II
- Private First Class John N. Reese Jr. (1923–1945), recipient for action in World War II

=== Others ===
- Acee Blue Eagle 1907–1959), artist and educator
- Captain Sonuk Mikko (Billy Bowlegs) (c. 1810–1859), Seminole who fought for the Union in the American Civil War
- Paul "Buddy" Burris (1923–2007), professional football player
- Joel Elliott (1840–1868), Civil War soldier and officer
- Benjamin Paddock (1926–1998), FBI 10-most wanted criminal in the 1960s, father of Stephen Paddock (1953–2017), who was responsible for the 2017 Las Vegas shooting
- Theodore M. Risenhoover (1934–2006), United States Congressman
- Vivia Thomas (?–1870), figure of a local legend that she was the daughter of a wealthy Boston family, and that she was abandoned at the wedding altar by a soldier who was assigned to Fort Gibson. She disguised herself as a man so she could pass as a soldier and travelled to the Fort alone, confronted him and killed him. She later died of pneumonia that she was said to have contracted while repeatedly braving cold and harsh weather to visit his grave site.

== See also ==
- Sam Houston – regarding Houston's wife, Talahina, who is buried here.
