= Kansas and Arkansas Valley Railway =

Railway in Arkansas, Oklahoma, and Kansas

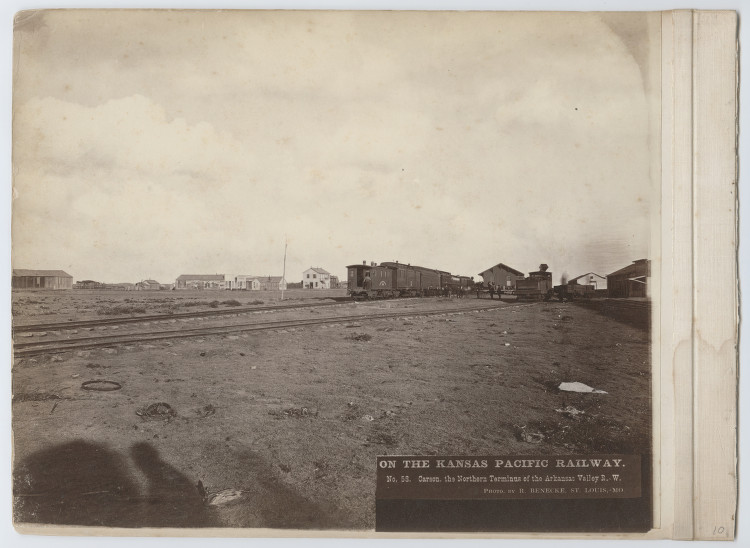
- No. 58. Carson, the Northern Terminus of the Arkansas Valley Railway

Overview
- Locale: Arkansas, Oklahoma and Kansas
- Dates of operation: 1888–1909

Technical
- Track gauge: 4 ft 8 1/2 in (1,435 mm)
- Length: 170.64 mi (274.62 km)

The Kansas and Arkansas Valley Railway (“K&AV”) was owner of 170.64 miles of single track, standard gauge steam railroad line, consisting of a 164.63 mile mainline from a junction near Van Buren, Arkansas through Oklahoma to Coffeyville, Kansas, with branch lines of 6.01 miles. It began operations in 1888 and sold its property to the St. Louis, Iron Mountain and Southern Railway (“Iron Mountain”) in 1909.

== History ==
The K&AV was incorporated under the General Laws of Arkansas on November 27, 1885. It proposed to build a railroad from the western terminus of the Little Rock and Fort Smith Railroad trackage near Van Buren, Arkansas, through what was then Indian Territory to a point near Arkansas City, Kansas on the Arkansas River. Congressional approval for such an effort was received in 1886. Construction was performed under contract by the Missouri Pacific Railway, and that company both advanced the funds and received the stock of the K&AV. In 1888, the railroad built the Arkansas trackage along with 78.2 miles in Oklahoma through Vian and Fort Gibson to Wagoner. The road was operated from its first day by Iron Mountain. In 1889 the railroad constructed another 79.2 miles from Wagoner through Inola, Claremore, Oologah and Lenapah to the Kansas state line south of Coffeyville. A separate company called the Kansas and Arkansas Valley Railroad, controlled by Iron Mountain (also a Missouri Pacific affiliate), built 2.41 miles of trackage in Kansas. This completed the K&AV line to Coffeyville, Kansas, giving the finished road a 164.63 mile single-track mainline. The year 1890 saw construction of a branch line from a point variously known as Cherokee Junction or Greenwood Junction in Oklahoma back to Fort Smith, Arkansas, a total of 6.01 miles, thus giving the K&AV 170.64 total miles of road, including the Kansas and Arkansas Valley Railroad trackage in Kansas which was sold to the K&AV that same year.

The K&AV property was leased on January 1, 1890 to the Little Rock and Fort Smith Railway, which in turn leased it to Iron Mountain. That continued until September 1, 1909, when the property was sold outright to Iron Mountain. Subsequently, Iron Mountain was sold at foreclosure in February of 1917, and combined with the Missouri Pacific Railway Company (of 1909) to form the Missouri Pacific Railroad Company on May 12, 1917. The Missouri Pacific itself was merged into the giant Union Pacific Railroad in 1997, and the old route continues to exist as part of the Union Pacific rail network.
