= Cleto Rodríguez =

U.S. Army Medal of Honor recipient

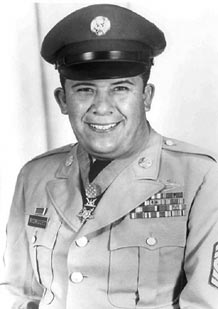
- Cleto L. Rodríguez, Medal of Honor
- Born: April 26, 1923; San Marcos, Texas
- Died: December 7, 1990 (aged 67); San Antonio, Texas
- Burial place: Fort Sam Houston National Cemetery
- Military career
- Allegiance: United States of America
- Branch: United States Army; United States Air Force
- Service years: 1944–1945, 1955–1970 (USA); 1952–1954 (USAF)
- Rank: Master Sergeant
- Conflicts: World War II
- Awards: Medal of Honor; Silver Star; Bronze Star; Purple Heart

Cleto L. Rodríguez (April 26, 1923 – December 7, 1990) was an American of Mexican descent who served in both the U.S. Army, and in the U.S. Air Force, and received the Medal of Honor for actions in Manila, Philippines, during World War II.

== Early years ==
Cleto Rodríguez, a Mexican-American, was born and lived in San Marcos, Texas until his parents died when he was nine years old. After the death of his parents he was sent to live with relatives in San Antonio, Texas. As a boy he worked for the Gunter Hotel as a newsboy. He enlisted in the United States Army in early 1944 where he served as a private in Company B, 148th Infantry, 37th Infantry Division.

== World War II ==
In Manila on February 9, 1945, Cleto's platoon was ordered to initiate an assault against the Paco Railroad Station that was being held by the Japanese. While crossing an open field in front of the railroad station, his platoon was stopped 100 yards from the station by intense Japanese gunfire. Without being ordered to do so, Cleto and a fellow soldier, Private First Class John N. Reese Jr., left the platoon and continued forward under heavy Japanese gunfire until they made it to a house 60 yards from the railroad station. The two soldiers remained in their position for an hour while firing at targets of opportunity, killing 35 Japanese soldiers and wounding many others. After an hour, the two soldiers moved forward towards the railroad station where they discovered a group of Japanese replacements attempting to reach pillboxes. Cleto and his fellow soldier opened heavy fire, killed more than 40 Japanese soldiers, and stopped any other attempts to reach the pillboxes. The enemy fire increased as the two soldiers came within 20 yards of the railroad station. Reese provided covering fire while Rodriguez moved up to the railroad station, where he threw five grenades through a doorway, killing seven Japanese soldiers, destroying a 20-mm gun, and wrecking a heavy machine gun. With their ammunition running low, the two soldiers made their way back to their platoon while each took turns providing covering fire for the other to move. During the return to their platoon, Private First Class Reese was killed. During the 2½ hours of fighting, the two soldiers killed more than 82 Japanese soldiers and completely disorganized the defense of the railroad station, which paved the way for U.S. soldiers to overwhelm the railroad station in victory. Two days later Cleto again enabled his platoon to advance when he single-handedly killed six Japanese soldiers and destroyed a well placed 20-mm gun. As a result of these actions, both Rodriguez and Reese were presented with the Medal of Honor for their determination to destroy the enemy, and courage in the face of tremendous odds.

== Medal of Honor citation ==
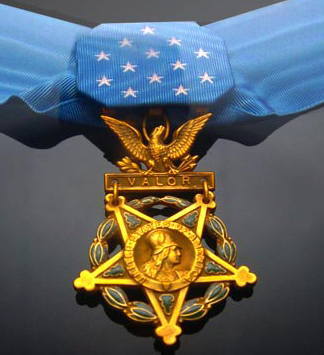

Cleto Rodríguez
Rank and organization: U.S. Army, Company B, 148th Infantry, 37th Infantry Division
Place and date: Paco Railroad Station, Manila, Philippines, February 9, 1945
Entered service at: San Antonio, TX
Born: San Marcos, TX
G.O.
Citation:

He was an automatic rifleman when his unit attacked the strongly defended Paco Railroad Station during the battle for Manila, Philippines. While making a frontal assault across an open field; his platoon was halted 100 yards from the station by intense enemy fire.

On his own initiative, he left the platoon, accompanied by a comrade, and continued forward to a house 60 yards from the objective. Although under constant enemy observation, the 2 men remained in this position for an hour; firing at targets of opportunity, killing more than 35 hostile soldiers and wounding many more.

Moving closer to the station and discovering a group of Japanese replacements attempting to reach pillboxes, they opened heavy fire, killed more than 40 and stopped all subsequent attempts to man the emplacements. Enemy fire became more intense as they advanced to within 20 yards of the station.

Then, covered by his companion, Pvt. Rodríguez boldly moved up to the building and threw 5 grenades through a doorway killing 7 Japanese, destroying a 20-mm. gun and wrecking a heavy machinegun. With their ammunition running low, the 2 men started to return to the American lines, alternately providing covering fire for each other's withdrawal.. In 2 1/2 hours of fierce fighting the intrepid team killed more than 82 Japanese, completely disorganized their defense, and paved the way for the subsequent overwhelming defeat of the enemy at this strongpoint.

Two days later, Pvt. Rodriguez again enabled his comrades to advance when he singlehandedly killed six Japanese and destroyed a well-placed 20-mm gun. By his outstanding skill with his weapon, gallant determination to destroy the enemy, and heroic courage in the face of tremendous odds, Pvt. Rodriguez, on two occasions, materially aided the advance of our troops in Manila.

== Later years ==
He later served in the U.S. Air Force from 1952 to 1954 and again served in the U.S. Army from 1955 to 1970. He died on December 7, 1990, in San Antonio, Texas and is buried in Fort Sam Houston National Cemetery.

== Namesake ==
He later married Ms. Flora Muniz and had four children: Cleto Jr., Betty, Mary and Joe; one of his grandchildren is also named Cleto Rodríguez and is a comedian and on-air personality for San Antonio's WOAI-TV and KABB TV stations. In 1975, the elementary school that Rodriguez attended during the 1930s in San Antonio was renamed in his honor, becoming the only school in the San Antonio school district to be named in honor of a former alumnus.

An 8.5-mile segment of U.S. Route 90 in San Antonio, from Interstate 410 to Interstate 35, has been designated the Cleto Rodriguez Freeway in his honor.

A rifle firing range at Ohio National Guard Training Site, Camp Perry, Ohio has been named in honor of Pvt Rodriguez. Camp Perry is the home of the National Rifle and Pistol Championships.

== Awards and recognitions ==
Among Cleto L. Rodríguez's decorations and medals were the following:

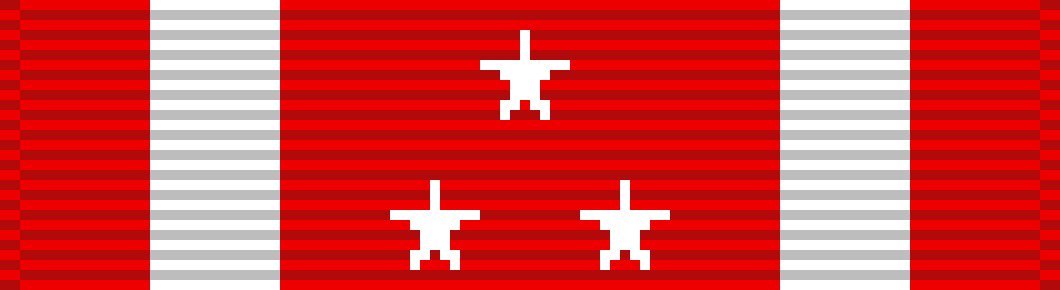
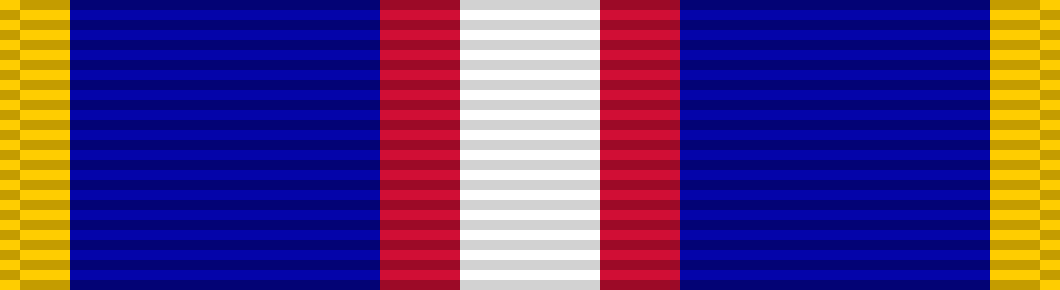

Badge	Combat Infantryman Badge		
1st row	Medal of Honor	Silver Star	Bronze Star Medal with "V" device and oak leaf cluster
2nd row	Purple Heart	Army Good Conduct Medal with silver loop	American Campaign Medal
3rd row	Asiatic-Pacific Campaign Medal with arrowhead and one campaign star	World War II Victory Medal	National Defense Service Medal with one service star
4th Row	Philippine Defense Medal	Philippine Independence Medal	Philippine Liberation Medal
Unit awards	Presidential Unit Citation		

== See also ==
- List of Medal of Honor recipients
- List of Medal of Honor recipients for World War II
- List of Hispanic Medal of Honor recipients
- Hispanic Americans in World War II
