= Matthew Arbuckle Jr. =

American military officer (1778–1851)

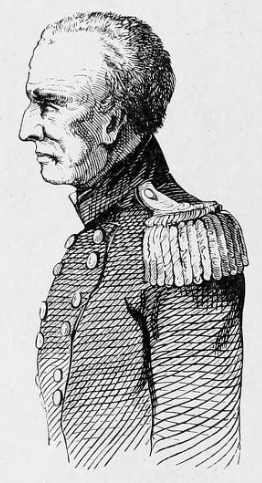
- Born: 28 December 1778; Greenbrier County, Virginia
- Died: 11 June 1851 (aged 72); Fort Smith, Arkansas
- Military career
- Allegiance: United States
- Branch: Infantry
- Service years: 1799–1851
- Commands: 7th Infantry Regiment

Brig. Gen. (Bvt) Matthew Arbuckle, Jr (1778–1851) was a career soldier in the U.S. Army closely identified with the Indian Territory for the last thirty years of his life.

== Biography ==
=== Early life ===
He was born 28 December 1778 in Greenbrier County, Virginia (now West Virginia), the fourth of six sons of Capt. Matthew Arbuckle Sr. and Frances (Hunter) Arbuckle. The father was a veteran of the Battle of Point Pleasant during Lord Dunmore's War and later distinguished himself in the American Revolution.

=== Military career ===
Little is known of his early life, but on 3 March 1799 he was commissioned ensign in the 3rd Infantry Regiment, and advanced to first lieutenant within eight months. In 1802, the Congress disbanded the 3rd Infantry and transferred him to the 2nd Infantry Regiment, where he was promoted to captain in 1806. He returned to the 3rd Infantry as a major in 1812. His regiment was assigned to various posts in the American South during the War of 1812. In 1814, he was promoted to lieutenant colonel and became the regiment's second-ranking officer. The 3rd Infantry was under General Andrew Jackson during and after the war. A family story exists that Arbuckle served on Jackson's staff during the Battle of New Orleans in 1815, but no evidence has been found for this claim. Arbuckle led a successful expedition against the "Fowltown Indians" of Southern Georgia in 1817, during the opening phase of the First Seminole War. Later in 1817, Arbuckle was in command of Fort Montgomery.

In 1820, the President promoted Arbuckle to colonel and gave him command of the 7th Infantry Regiment, four of whose companies he led in 1821 to reinforce Fort Smith on the Arkansas River. In 1824, he moved the regiment farther west, establishing Cantonments (later Forts) Gibson and later Towson, the first military posts in the Indian Territory (now Oklahoma). As commander at Fort Gibson, he was responsible for constructing roads and maintaining peaceful relations between the Indian tribes indigenous to the region and those then forced to migrate to Indian Territory. After ten years of this service, he was breveted to brigadier general. In the spring of 1834, on the eve of the First Dragoon Expedition (also called the Dodge-Leavenworth Expedition), Brigadier General Arbuckle was replaced as regional commander by General Henry Leavenworth and returned to Virginia. General Leavenworth, however, unexpectedly died in July 1834, and the Department of War recalled Brigadier General Arbuckle to command Fort Gibson.

During the Texas Revolution of 1835–1836, the majority of his troops were reassigned to General Zachary Taylor's "Army of Observation" at Fort Jessup, Louisiana, but Arbuckle managed to maintain order even as the pace of Indian removal accelerated. By the end of the decade, the relocation of the southeastern Indian tribes to Oklahoma was largely complete. Though civil war threatened to break out among some of the tribes, in 1841, when he left Fort Gibson for the second time, Arbuckle reported, "I have maintained peace on this frontier."

He was transferred to Baton Rouge, Louisiana, where he headed the military district but commanded no troops directly. He had developed a considerable professional rivalry with Zachary Taylor, which may explain why he played no significant role in the Mexican–American War. In 1848, he was posted to Fort Smith as commander of the newly created Seventh Military District. In 1849, his troops began to provide security for Americans active in the California Gold Rush on the southwestern route to California, which he established south of the Canadian River. The same year, Taylor, having been elected president, urged the War Department to close Fort Smith and retire Arbuckle. Taylor died before this could be accomplished. Arbuckle's superiors immediately confirmed his command and re-designated Fort Smith as headquarters of the Seventh Military District. The General was making plans to extend farther west the security system that he had established to protect Americans traveling to California, when he died suddenly of cholera at Fort Smith on 11 June 1851 during a pandemic.

Just before his death, several units of troops under his command had built an outpost on Wildhorse Creek in present-day Garvin County, Oklahoma, and the new post was named Fort Arbuckle in his honor. The name soon transferred in common usage to the nearby hills, which still are known as the Arbuckle Mountains. Arbuckle Island on the Arkansas River, which he once owned, is also named for him.

== Dates of rank ==
- 2nd Lieutenant, 3rd Infantry: 3 March 1799
- 1st Lieutenant, 3rd Infantry: 24 October 1799
- Transferred to 2nd Infantry: 1 April 1802
- Captain, 2nd Infantry: 20 June 1806
- Major, 3rd Infantry: 15 August 1812
- Lieutenant Colonel, 3rd Infantry: 9 March 1814
- Unassigned: 17 May 1815
- Lieutenant Colonel, 7th Infantry: 10 April 1817
- Colonel, 7th Infantry: 16 March 1820
- Brevet Brigadier General: 16 March 1830
- Died in service: 11 June 1851
