= Fort Gibson, Oklahoma =

Town in Oklahoma, US

Fort Gibson, Oklahoma ᏧᏍᏆᎦᎵ ᏗᏐᏴᎢ (Cherokee)
- Town
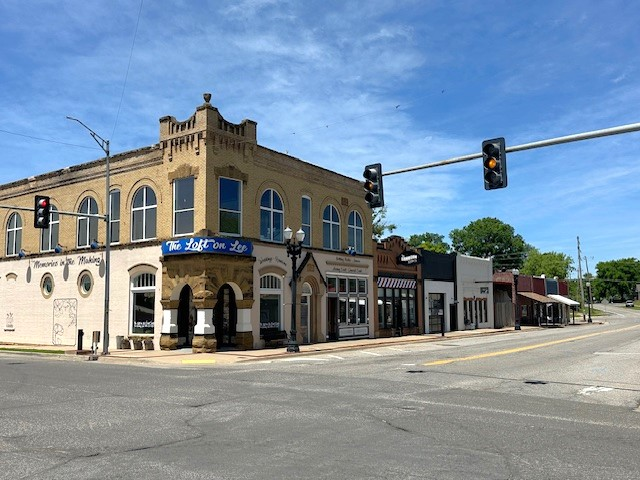
- Downtown Fort Gibson (May 2025)
- Motto: "The Oldest Town in Oklahoma"
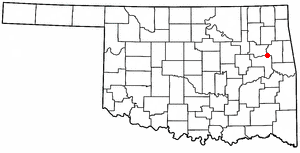
- Location in Oklahoma
- Coordinates: 35°46′35″N 95°15′37″W
- Country: United States
- State: Oklahoma
- Counties: Muskogee, Cherokee
- Founded: April 21, 1824

Area
  - Total: 14.01 sq mi (36.29 km^{2})
  - Land: 13.36 sq mi (34.60 km^{2})
  - Water: 0.65 sq mi (1.69 km^{2})
- Elevation: 505 ft (154 m)

Population (2020)
  - Total: 3,814
  - Density: 285.5/sq mi (110.24/km^{2})
- Time zone: UTC-6 (Central (CST))
  - Summer (DST): UTC-5 (CDT)
- ZIP Code: 74434
- Area codes: 539/918
- FIPS code: 40-27200
- GNIS feature ID: 2412640
- Website: www.fortgibson.net

Fort Gibson (Cherokee: ᏧᏍᏆᎦᎵ ᏗᏐᏴᎢ, romanized: tsusquagali disoyvi) is a town in Muskogee County in the U.S. state of Oklahoma. A small portion extends north into Cherokee County. The town population was 3,814 as of the 2020 census, down from 4,154 in 2010. It is the location of Fort Gibson Historical Site and Fort Gibson National Cemetery and is located near the end of the Cherokees' Trail of Tears at Tahlequah.

Colonel Matthew Arbuckle of the United States Army established Fort Gibson in 1824. The Army abandoned the fort in 1890. A recreation of the fort stands at the historic site, which was built as a Works Progress Administration project between 1935 and 1939, at a different location from the original fort.

The town calls itself "The Oldest Town in Oklahoma."

== History ==
Fort Gibson was originally established as a military garrison, Cantonment Gibson, in April 1824. The camp was set up to facilitate U.S. government policies of westward expansion and Indian removal. After the founding of Fort Gibson in 1824, military families, Indians desiring military protection, and free African Americans settled near the fort, forming a town. After the Army abandoned Fort Gibson in 1857, the Cherokee Nation took over the military stockade and renamed the town Keetoowah.

The Army reoccupied Fort Gibson during the American Civil War and renamed it Fort Blunt from 1862 to 1865, for Major General James G. Blunt. The town again prospered as refugees from fighting elsewhere fled to the relative safety of the fort. By the spring of 1863, soldiers in the Indian Home Guard occupied the fort. For several months, the Federal-supported garrison had to fight off raids by Stand Watie and his Confederate-backed Cherokee horsemen. Aside from Confederate raids, the garrison also suffered from outbreaks of cholera and smallpox. Sonuk Mikko, an officer in the Indian Home Guard, contracted smallpox while stationed at the fort and succumbed to the illness.

On May 20, 1898, the Articles of Incorporation for the town of Fort Gibson were established under the Arkansas Statutes, placing all of the densely settled areas under one jurisdiction.

The townspeople considered Fort Gibson poorly located after suffering fires, mosquitoes, and other afflictions. They moved the town to higher ground around 1900. The first buildings had faced west toward the Kansas and Arkansas Valley Railway (later the Missouri Pacific Railroad) tracks. In 1904 the town of Fort Gibson, Indian Territory, was surveyed and platted. In 1904 the town was turned around and situated one block east when J. C. Pierce built the first brick building. In 1906 John C. Berd constructed a brick-and-stone building for his drugstore, and the commercial district grew around these two permanent features. It had 1,063 residents in 1907.

One of the oldest non-Indian settlements in Oklahoma, Fort Gibson had other firsts for Oklahoma, including:

- First telephone
- First drama theater
- First steamboat landing
- First school for the blind
- First highway to Fort Smith
- First interurban, which connected Fort Gibson to Muskogee.

In 1896 J. S. Holden started a weekly newspaper, the Post. At least six other newspapers followed in the early 20th century; the Fort Gibson Times continued into the 21st century.

In 1940, 1,233 people populated the town, and by 1970 there were 1,418 residents. The 2000 census listed 4,054 residents, and the school system housed 1,900 students at a teacher-student ratio of one to fifteen.

Home to 26 churches and 14 civic clubs and organizations at the beginning of the 21st century, the town boasted a strong civic spirit. The manufacturing industry supports the majority of workers, and the health care sector is close behind.

=== Steamboats ===
Part of the reason for the locale's original success was that Fort Gibson was placed on the Grand River (a/k/a the lower section of the Neosho River) near where both it and the Verdigris River join and enhance the Arkansas River. This made it the head of navigation on the Arkansas—the farthest point up the river that could be navigated by significant ships—and an obvious river transportation point. So, while some of the early vessels operating from the town were canoes, bateaux, or even keelboats (frequently pulled by men on shore with towropes), the town was reached by steamboat as early as 1824 when the Florence delivered army recruits to Fort Gibson. In February 1828 the locale received a visit from a vessel called The Facility captained by one Philip Pennywit, and was within three years of that a regular steamboat stop. In 1832, noted author Washington Irving, who had spent twenty days traveling in Indian Territory—an experience documented in his book A Tour on the Prairies—departed the territory via steamboat at Fort Gibson.

Steamboat traffic grew and peaked in the two decades preceding the Civil War. For example, the riverboat Philip Pennywit (part owned by the aforementioned captain) was advertising in February 1849 its regular runs from New Orleans to Fort Gibson. The usual "boating season" ran from January to June, but some ships attempted to operate year-round.

The Civil War curtailed riverboat activity, as when the Union steamer J. R. Williams was destroyed by Confederate forces on June 15, 1864, trying to make a supply run to Fort Gibson. Nevertheless, activity picked up again after the war, as shown by a report in 1870 that twenty cargo-laden steamboats averaging three hundred tons apiece were operating between Fort Gibson and various ports on the Mississippi and Ohio rivers. However, with the rise of railroads, riverboat usage trailed off and Fort Gibson declined as a transportation and commercial center.

== Geography ==
Fort Gibson is located in northeastern Muskogee County. A small portion of the town extends north into a corner of Cherokee County. Fort Gibson is bordered to the west by the city of Muskogee, the Muskogee County seat.

U.S. Route 62 passes through the southern part of Fort Gibson, leading west 8 miles (13 km) to the center of Muskogee and northeast 20 miles (32 km) to Tahlequah. State Highway 10 leads south-southeast from Fort Gibson 25 miles (40 km) to Gore, while State Highway 80 leads northeast 18 miles (29 km) to Hulbert.

According to the U.S. Census Bureau, the town of Fort Gibson has a total area of 14.0 square miles (36 km^{2}), of which 13.4 square miles (35 km^{2}) are land and 0.7 square miles (1.8 km^{2}), or 4.66%, are water. The Grand River (Neosho River) follows the northwest border of the town and joins the Arkansas River, which flows just west of the town boundary, then forms the southern boundary.

== Demographics ==
Historical population
Census	Pop.	Note	%±
1900	617		—
1910	1,344		117.8%
1920	1,353		0.7%
1930	1,159		−14.3%
1940	1,233		6.4%
1950	1,496		21.3%
1960	1,407		−5.9%
1970	1,418		0.8%
1980	2,477		74.7%
1990	3,359		35.6%
2000	4,054		20.7%
2010	4,154		2.5%
2020	3,814		−8.2%
U.S. Decennial Census

=== 2020 census ===
As of the 2020 census, Fort Gibson had a population of 3,814. The median age was 36.9 years. 27.7% of residents were under the age of 18 and 17.0% of residents were 65 years of age or older. For every 100 females there were 87.1 males, and for every 100 females age 18 and over there were 82.6 males age 18 and over.

0.0% of residents lived in urban areas, while 100.0% lived in rural areas.

There were 1,431 households in Fort Gibson, of which 37.8% had children under the age of 18 living in them. Of all households, 46.5% were married-couple households, 16.2% were households with a male householder and no spouse or partner present, and 31.0% were households with a female householder and no spouse or partner present. About 27.0% of all households were made up of individuals and 13.0% had someone living alone who was 65 years of age or older.

Racial composition as of the 2020 census
Race	Number	Percent
White	2,094	54.9%
Black or African American	76	2.0%
American Indian and Alaska Native	908	23.8%
Asian	13	0.3%
Native Hawaiian and Other Pacific Islander	2	0.1%
Some other race	71	1.9%
Two or more races	650	17.0%
Hispanic or Latino (of any race)	193	5.1%

=== 2000 census ===
As of the census of 2000, there were 4,054 people, 1,467 households, and 1,113 families residing in the town. The population density was 301.8 inhabitants per square mile (116.5/km^{2}). There were 1,563 housing units at an average density of 116.4 per square mile (44.9/km^{2}). The racial makeup of the town was 68.75% White, 2.00% African American, 19.76% Native American, 0.12% Asian, 2.54% from other races, and 6.83% from two or more races. Hispanic or Latino of any race were 4.88% of the population.

There were 1,467 households, out of which 43.4% had children under the age of 18 living with them, 57.9% were married couples living together, 14.2% had a female householder with no husband present, and 24.1% were non-families. 21.6% of all households were made up of individuals, and 9.1% had someone living alone who was 65 years of age or older. The average household size was 2.72 and the average family size was 3.16.

In the town, the population was spread out, with 30.8% under the age of 18, 9.5% from 18 to 24, 27.3% from 25 to 44, 21.1% from 45 to 64, and 11.3% who were 65 years of age or older. The median age was 33 years. For every 100 females, there were 91.0 males. For every 100 females age 18 and over, there were 85.3 males.

The median income for a household in the town was $30,975, and the median income for a family was $36,944. Males had a median income of $30,362 versus $21,525 for females. The per capita income for the town was $14,042. About 14.2% of families and 16.5% of the population were below the poverty line, including 22.3% of those under age 18 and 23.9% of those age 65 or over.

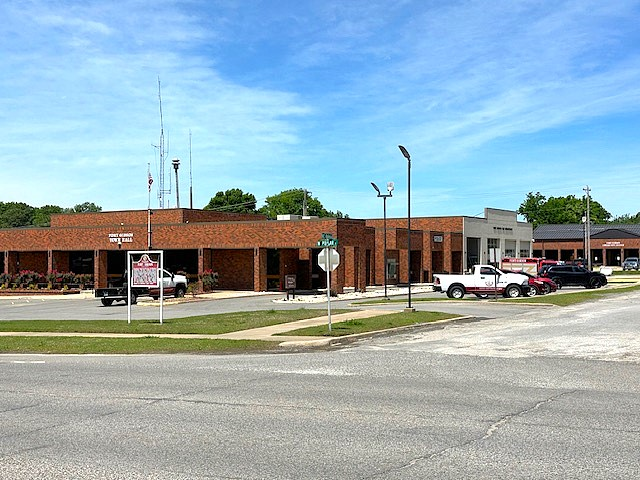
Fort Gibson Town Hall, Fire Department and Community Center, May 2025

== Government ==
Fort Gibson has a board of trustees type of government.

The town is located in Oklahoma's 2nd congressional district. At the federal level, the town is represented by Republican senator James Lankford, as well as Republican congressman Josh Breecheen.

== Historic sites ==
NRHP-listed sites in Fort Gibson include:

- Fort Gibson (the fort site at Lee and Ash streets)
- Administration Building-Post Hospital
- Commandant's Quarters
- Dragoon Commandant's Quarters
- Officer's Quarters
- Post Adjutant's Office
- Post Blacksmith Shop
- Cherokee National Cemetery
- Nash-Swindler House
- Seawell-Ross-Isom House

== Notable people ==
- Junior Kennedy, Major League Baseball player born in Fort Gibson
- Teddy Lehman, professional football player
- Frank Linzy, pitcher for San Francisco Giants
- Lee Wiley, jazz singer

== See also ==
- Black Seminoles (Cimarrones)
- Buffalo Soldiers at Fort Leavenworth
