= 366th Fighter Squadron =

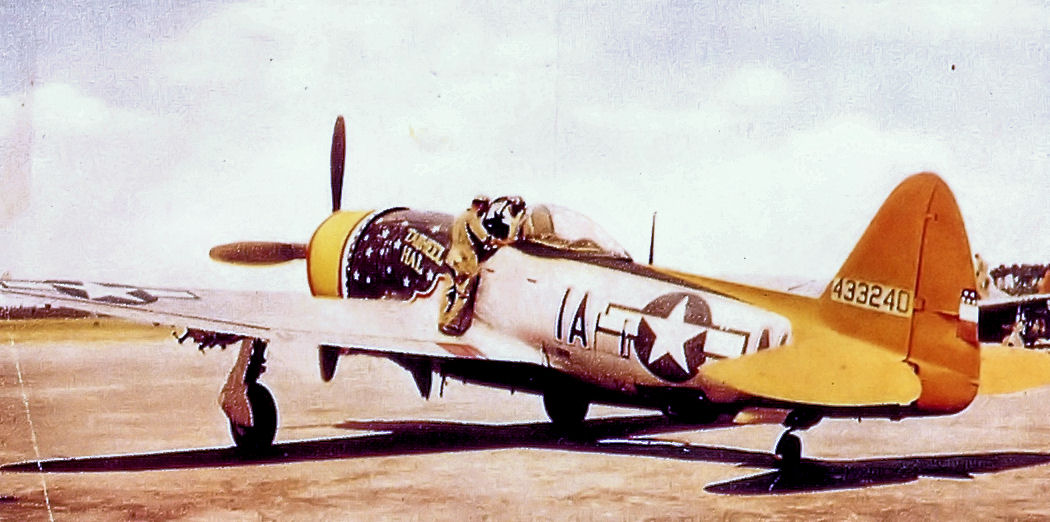
- 358th Fighter Group P-47 Thunderbolt at Toul
- Active: 1943–45
- Country: United States
- Branch: United States Army Air Forces
- Role: Fighter
- Engagements: European Theater of Operations
- Decorations: Distinguished Unit Citation; French Croix de Guerre with Palm

Insignia
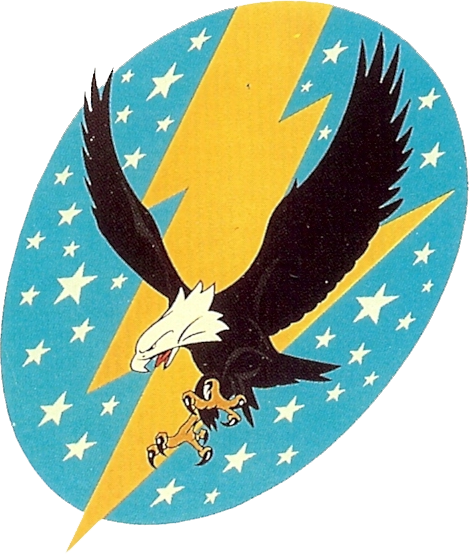
- 366th Fighter Squadron emblem (approved 6 September 1943)
- Fuselage code: IP

The 366th Fighter Squadron is an inactive United States Air Force unit. It was last assigned to the 358th Fighter Group of IX Fighter Command La Junta Army Airfield, Colorado, where it was inactivated on 7 November 1945.

The squadron was first activated at the beginning of 1943. After training in the United States, it moved to England and entered combat in the European Theater of Operations. The squadron earned the Distinguished Unit Citation and the French Croix de Guerre with Palm during its combat missions. After VE Day, the squadron returned to the United States, where it was inactivated on 7 November 1945.

== History ==
The 366th Fighter Squadron was activated on 1 January 1943 at Richmond Army Air Base, Virginia as one of the original squadrons of the 358th Fighter Group. The squadron initially began training with the Curtiss P-40 Warhawk. Later that year, the unit replaced its Warhawks with the Republic P-47 Thunderbolt, which it flew for the remainder of the war. The squadron left the United States in September 1943.

The 366th arrived in England during October 1943, where it began operations with Eighth Air Force on 20 December 1943, but was transferred to Ninth Air Force in February 1944. The unit engaged primarily in missions escorting bombers attacking targets on the continent of Europe until April 1944. The squadron then undertook dive bombing missions against marshalling yards and airfields and attacked Axis communications during April and May from its new station, an advanced landing ground at RAF High Halden, to help prepare for the invasion of Normandy.

The squadron escorted troop carrier formations on D Day and the following day as the formations dropped paratroopers on the Cotentin Peninsula. For the remainder of June, it attacked rail lines, troop concentrations, bridges and transport. The squadron moved to France in July and, from its base at Cretteville, took part in operations that resulted in the Allied breakthrough at St Lo. The squadron continued to fly escort, interdiction and close air support missions during the Allied drive across France and into Germany throughout 1944–45.

The squadron received a Distinguished Unit Citation for its actions between 24 December 1944 and 2 January 1945, when it supported the Seventh Army attacking railroads and rolling stock, other vehicles and artillery formations. It also destroyed numerous Luftwaffe fighters while undertaking defensive operations during the German-launched Operation Bodenplatte, an attack concentrating on forward Allied air bases in an attempt by the Luftwaffe to attain air superiority in the area of the Battle of the Bulge. In March, the squadron attacked German forces attempting to withdraw across the Rhine River, destroying motor transport and hampering the withdrawal efforts, earning a second Distinguished Unit Citation. The following month, the squadron attacked German airfields near Munich and Ingolstadt, engaging aircraft and supporting the advance of Allied ground forces in the area, earning a third award of the Distinguished Unit Citation. The squadron was also awarded the French Croix de Guerre with Palm by the Government of France for its assistance in the liberation of France. The squadron was credited with the destruction of 29.5 enemy aircraft during the war.

The squadron remained in Germany after VE Day until July 1945, when it returned to the United States, where it was inactivated on 7 November 1945.

== Lineage ==
- Constituted as the 366th Fighter Squadron (Single Engine) on 20 December 1942

Activated on 1 January 1943
Inactivated on 7 November 1945

=== Assignments ===
- 358th Fighter Group: 1 February 1943 – 7 November 1945

=== Stations ===
- Richmond Army Air Base, Virginia, 1 January 1943
- Camp Springs Army Air Field, Maryland, 20 April 1943
- Millville Army Air Field, New Jersey, 29 May 1943
- Philadelphia Municipal Airport, Pennsylvania, 16 June 1943
- Richmond Army Air Base, Virginia, 13 August 1943 – 25 September 1943
- RAF Goxhill (Station 345), England, United Kingdom, 20 October 1943
- RAF Leiston (Station 373), England, United Kingdom, 4 December 1943
- RAF Raydon (Station 157), England, United Kingdom, 21 January 1944
- RAF High Halden (Station 411), England, United Kingdom, 13 April 1944
- Cretteville (A-14), France, 4 July 1944
- Pontorson (A-28), France, 14 August 1944
- Vitry-le-François (A-67), France, 15 September 1944
- Mourmelon-le-Grand Airfield (A-80), France, 16 October 1944
- Toul-Croix de Metz Airfield (A-90), France, 20 November 1944
- Mannheim-Sandhofen Airfield (Y-79), Germany, 8 April 1945
- Reims-Champagne Airport (A-62), France, 23 June 1945 – 10 July 1945
- La Junta Army Air Field, Colorado 3 August 1945 – 7 November 1945

=== Aircraft ===
- Curtiss P-40 Warhawk, 1943
- Republic P-47 Thunderbolt, 1943–1945
