= 367th Fighter Squadron =

367th Fighter Squadron

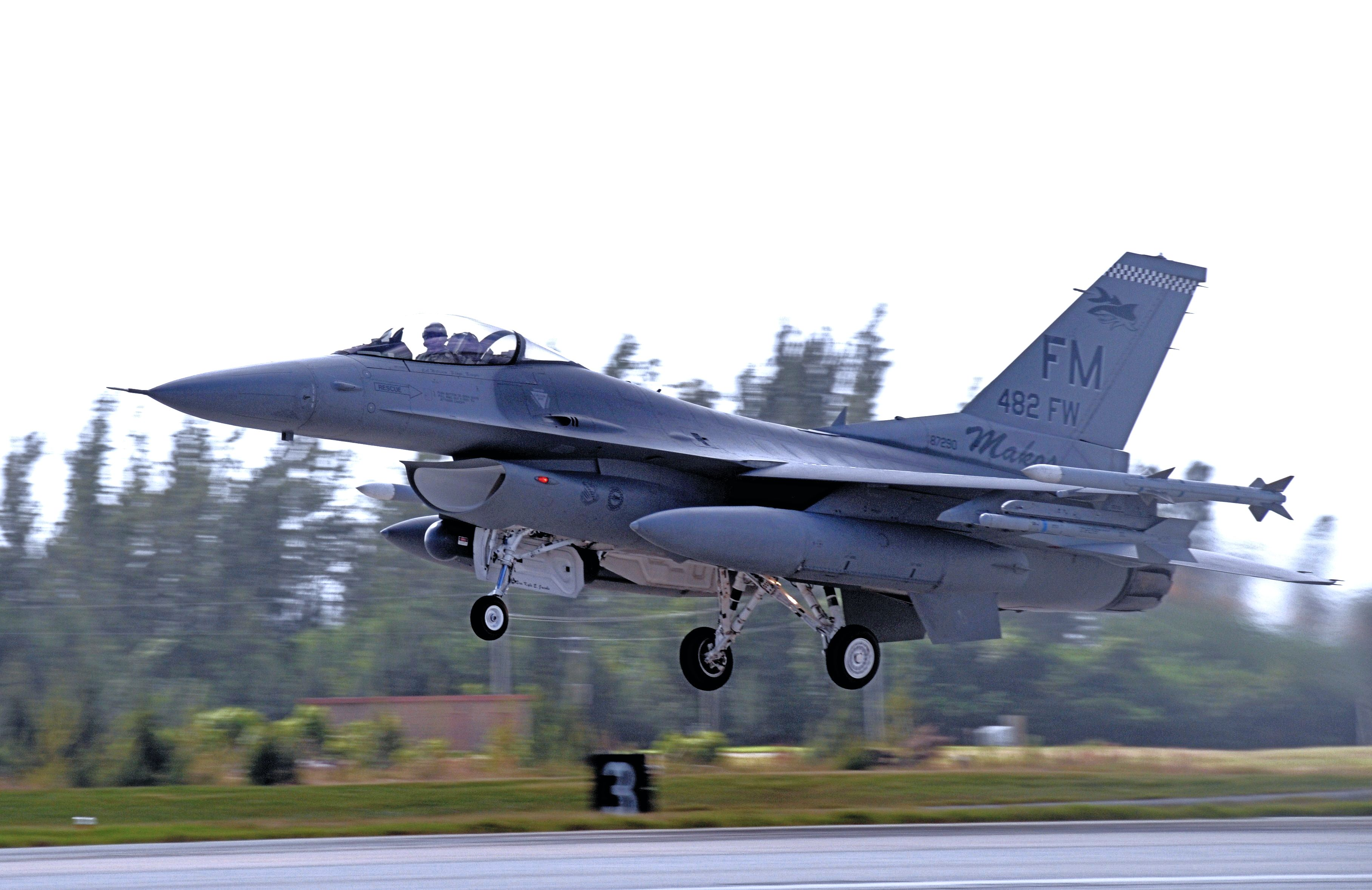
- 482d Fighter Wing F-16 Fighting Falcon (Note: Aircraft is General Dynamics F-16C Block 30H Fighting Falcon serial 87–290 at Homestead Air Reserve Base.)
- Active: 1943–1945; 2015–present
- Country: United States
- Branch: United States Air Force
- Role: Fighter
- Size: 150
- Part of: Air Combat Command
- Garrison/HQ: Homestead Air Reserve Base
- Nickname: Vultures
- Engagements: European Theater of Operations
- Decorations: Distinguished Unit Citation; French Croix de Guerre with Palm

Commanders
- Current commander: Lt Col Henry Jefress

Insignia
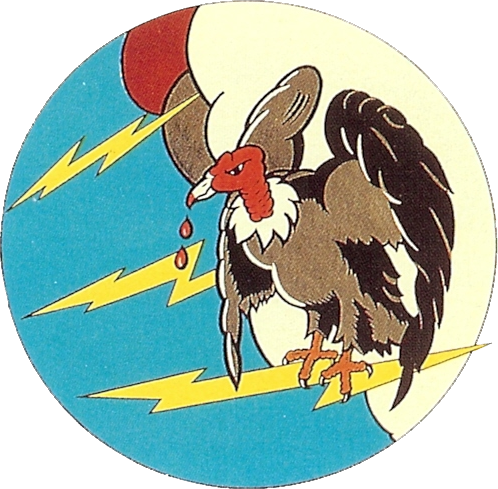
- 367th Fighter Squadron emblem (Note: Approved 1 March 1944. Description: On a disc medium blue, a vulture proper, beak dripping blood, perched on one of three golden orange lightning bolts issuing from large white cloud formation in dexter chief, small cloud formations in dexter chief of gray and maroon respectively.)
- World War II Fuselage code: CP
- Tail code: FM

The 367th Fighter Squadron is a "reverse" associate United States Air Force unit, stationed at Homestead Air Reserve Base, Florida, where it operates and maintains the General Dynamics F-16 Fighting Falcons of the 482d Fighter Wing of the Air Force Reserve Command. Its parent is the 495th Fighter Group at Shaw Air Force Base, South Carolina.

The squadron was first activated at the beginning of 1943. After training in the United States, it moved to England and entered combat in the European Theater of Operations. The squadron earned the Distinguished Unit Citation and the French Croix de Guerre with Palm during its combat missions. After VE Day, the squadron returned to the United States, where it was inactivated on 7 November 1945. The squadron was reactivated in October 2015.

== History ==
=== World War II ===
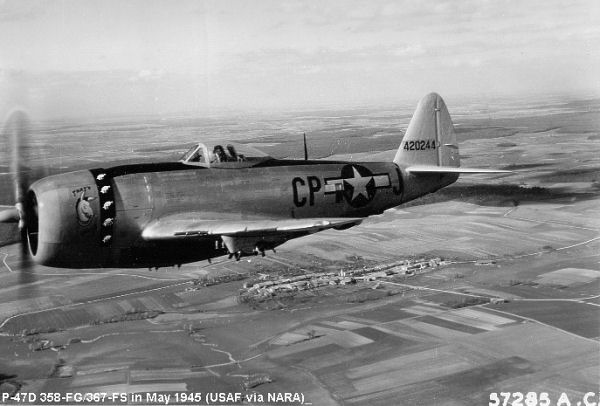
Squadron P-47 at High Halden

The 367th Fighter Squadron was activated on 1 January 1943 at Richmond Army Air Base, Virginia as one of the original squadrons of the 358th Fighter Group. The squadron initially began training with the Curtiss P-40 Warhawk. Later that year, the unit replaced its Warhawks with the Republic P-47 Thunderbolt, which it flew for the remainder of the war. The squadron left Richmond in September 1943 for the port of embarkation. It sailed for England on the SS Monterey on 8 October.

The 367th arrived in England during October 1943, where it began operations with Eighth Air Force on 20 December 1943, but was transferred to Ninth Air Force in February 1944. The unit engaged primarily in missions escorting bombers attacking targets on the continent of Europe until April 1944. The squadron dive bombed marshalling yards and airfields and attacked enemy communications during April and May from its new station, an advanced landing ground at RAF High Halden, to help prepare for the invasion of Normandy.

The squadron escorted troop carrier formations on D Day and the following day as the formations dropped paratroopers on the Cotentin Peninsula. For the remainder of June, it attacked rail lines, troop concentrations, bridges and transport. The squadron moved to France in July and, from its base at Cretteville, took part in operations that resulted in the Allied breakthrough at St Lo. The squadron continued to fly escort, interdiction and close air support missions during the Allied drive across France and into Germany.

The squadron received a Distinguished Unit Citation for its actions between 24 December 1944 and 2 January 1945, when it supported Seventh Army, attacking railroads and rolling stock, other vehicles and enemy artillery formations. It also destroyed numerous Luftwaffe fighters while defending against Operation Bodenplatte, an attack concentrating on forward Allied air bases in an attempt by the Luftwaffe to attain air superiority in the area of the Battle of the Bulge. In March, the squadron attacked German forces attempting to withdraw across the Rhine River, destroying motor transport and hampering the withdrawal efforts, earning a second Distinguished Unit Citation. The following month, the squadron attacked enemy airfields near Munich and Ingolstadt, engaging aircraft and supporting the advance of ground forces in the area, earning a third award of the Distinguished Unit Citation. The squadron was also awarded the French Croix de Guerre with Palm by the Government of France for its assistance in the liberation of France. The squadron was credited with the destruction of 49.5 enemy aircraft during the war.

The squadron remained in Germany after VE Day until July 1945, when it returned to the United States, where it was inactivated on 7 November 1945.

=== Associate unit ===
The 367th Fighter Squadron was reactivated at Homestead Air Reserve Base on 23 October 2015, replacing Detachment 93 of the 495th Fighter Group. Under the "Total Force Integration" program, the squadron, a regular unit, will operate and maintain the General Dynamics F-16 Fighting Falcon aircraft of the 482d Fighter Wing of Air Force Reserve Command as an associate unit.

== Lineage ==
- Constituted as the 367th Fighter Squadron (Single Engine) on 20 December 1942

Activated on 1 January 1943
Inactivated on 7 November 1945

- Redesignated 367th Fighter Squadron

Activated 23 October 2015

=== Assignments ===
- 358th Fighter Group: 1 January 1943 – 7 November 1945
- 495th Fighter Group: 23 October 2015 – present

=== Stations ===
- Richmond Army Air Base, Virginia, 1 January 1943
- Camp Springs Army Air Field, Maryland, 20 April 1943
- Millville Army Air Field, New Jersey, 29 May 1943
- Philadelphia Municipal Airport, Pennsylvania, 16 June 1943
- Richmond Army Air Base, Virginia, 13 August 1943 – 25 September 1943
- RAF Goxhill (Station 345), England, United Kingdom, 20 October 1943
- RAF Leiston (Station 373), England, United Kingdom, 4 December 1943
- RAF Raydon (Station 157), England, United Kingdom, 21 January 1944
- RAF High Halden (Station 411), England, United Kingdom, 13 April 1944
- Cretteville (A-14), France, 4 July 1944
- Pontorson (A-28), France, 14 August 1944
- Vitry-le-François (A-67), France, 15 September 1944
- Mourmelon-le-Grand Airfield (A-80), France, 16 October 1944
- Toul-Croix de Metz Airfield (A-90), France, 20 November 1944
- Mannheim-Sandhofen Airfield (Y-79), Germany, 8 April 1945
- Reims-Champagne Airport (A-62), France, 23 June 1945 – 10 July 1945
- La Junta Army Air Field, Colorado 3 August 1945 – 7 November 1945
- Homestead Air Reserve Base, 23 October 2015 – present

=== Aircraft ===
- Curtiss P-40 Warhawk, 1943
- Republic P-47 Thunderbolt, 1943–1945
- General Dynamics F-16 Fighting Falcon, 2015–present

=== Awards and campaigns ===
| Award streamer | Award | Dates | Notes |
|---|---|---|---|
| | Presidential Unit Citation | 24 December 1944–2 January 1945 | Ardennes, 367th Fighter Squadron |
| | Presidential Unit Citation | 19 March 1945–20 March 1945 | Europe, 367th Fighter Squadron |
| | Presidential Unit Citation | 8 April 1945–25 April 1945 | Germany, 367th Fighter Squadron |
| | French Croix de Guerre with Palm | 1944–1945 | 367th Fighter Squadron |

| Campaign Streamer | Campaign | Dates | Notes |
|---|---|---|---|
| | American Theater without inscription | 1 January 1943 – 25 September 1943 | (Note: Per Maurer. However, normally one year of service was required for this award unless the service was within the theater, but outside the Continental United States.) |
| | Air Offensive, Europe | 20 October 1943 – 5 June 1944 | |
| | Normandy | 6 June 1944 – 24 July 1944 | |
| | Northern France | 25 July 1944 – 14 September 1944 | |
| | Rhineland | 15 September 1944 – 21 March 1945 | |
| | Ardennes-Alsace | 16 December 1944 – 25 January 1945 | |
| | Central Europe | 22 March 1944 – 21 May 1945 | |

== See also ==
- List of United States Air Force fighter squadrons
- General Dynamics F-16 Fighting Falcon operators
