= 496th Fighter Training Group =

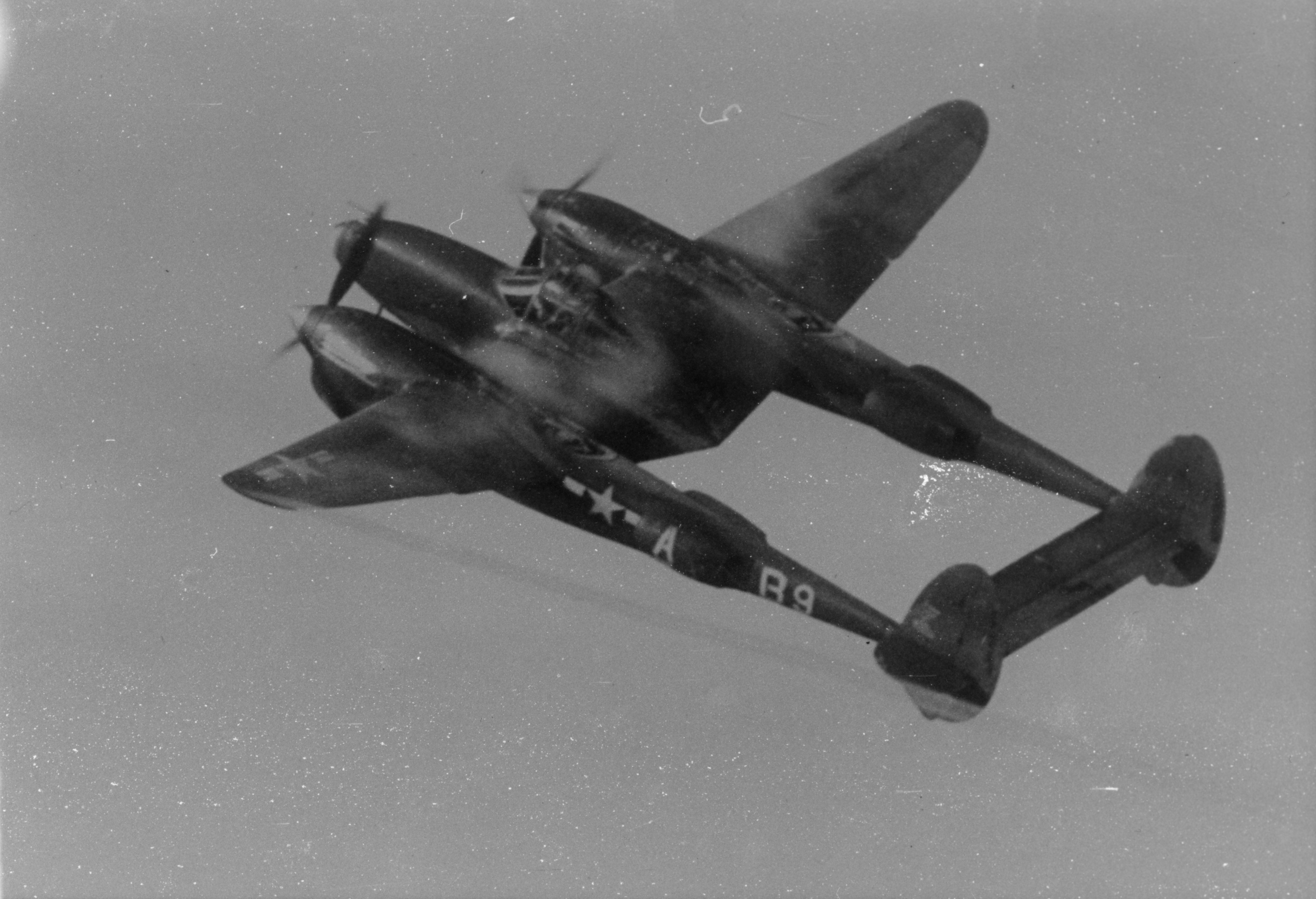
- A P-38 Lightning of the group in flight
- Active: 1943–1945
- Country: United States
- Branch: United States Army Air Forces
- Role: Fighter training, support services
- Part of: Eighth Air Force

The 496th Fighter Training Group (FTG) was a United States Army Air Forces unit, serving with the Eighth Air Force in the United Kingdom during World War II. Activated in December 1943, the unit trained replacement pilots on the Lockheed P-38 Lightning and later the North American P-51 Mustang. In October 1944 its training mission was ended when the Eighth Air Force decided to instead train pilots in operational training units that were part of combat fighter groups. For the remainder of its service, the group provided support services for units at RAF Halesworth, including an air-sea rescue squadron. The group was inactivated in April 1945; its attached units were directly subordinated to the 65th Fighter Wing and remaining personnel transferred to an air service squadron.

== History ==
The group was activated on 11 December 1943 at Greencastle (Army Air Forces Station 237) in County Down, Northern Ireland. The group was part of VIII Composite Command, which had been formed in August 1942 to provide operational training. On 27 December the 496th was moved without personnel to Goxhill (AAF Station 345) in Lincolnshire. The group operated Combat Crew Replacement Center #8. Colonel Harold W. McGee, Goxhill station commander, took command of the 496th FTG. Support units at Goxhill formerly attached to the 67th Fighter Wing were consolidated into the 496th. The group included the 554th Fighter Training Squadron, which conducted P-38 training, and the 555th Fighter Training Squadron, which conducted P-51 training. The 2d and 3d Tow Target and Gunnery Flights were responsible for gunnery services, both ground-based and aerial. On 14 August 1944, the 495th Fighter Training Group took over all P-38 training, and the 554th Squadron's P-38s were transferred to the 495th FTG; the 554th switched to P-51 training.

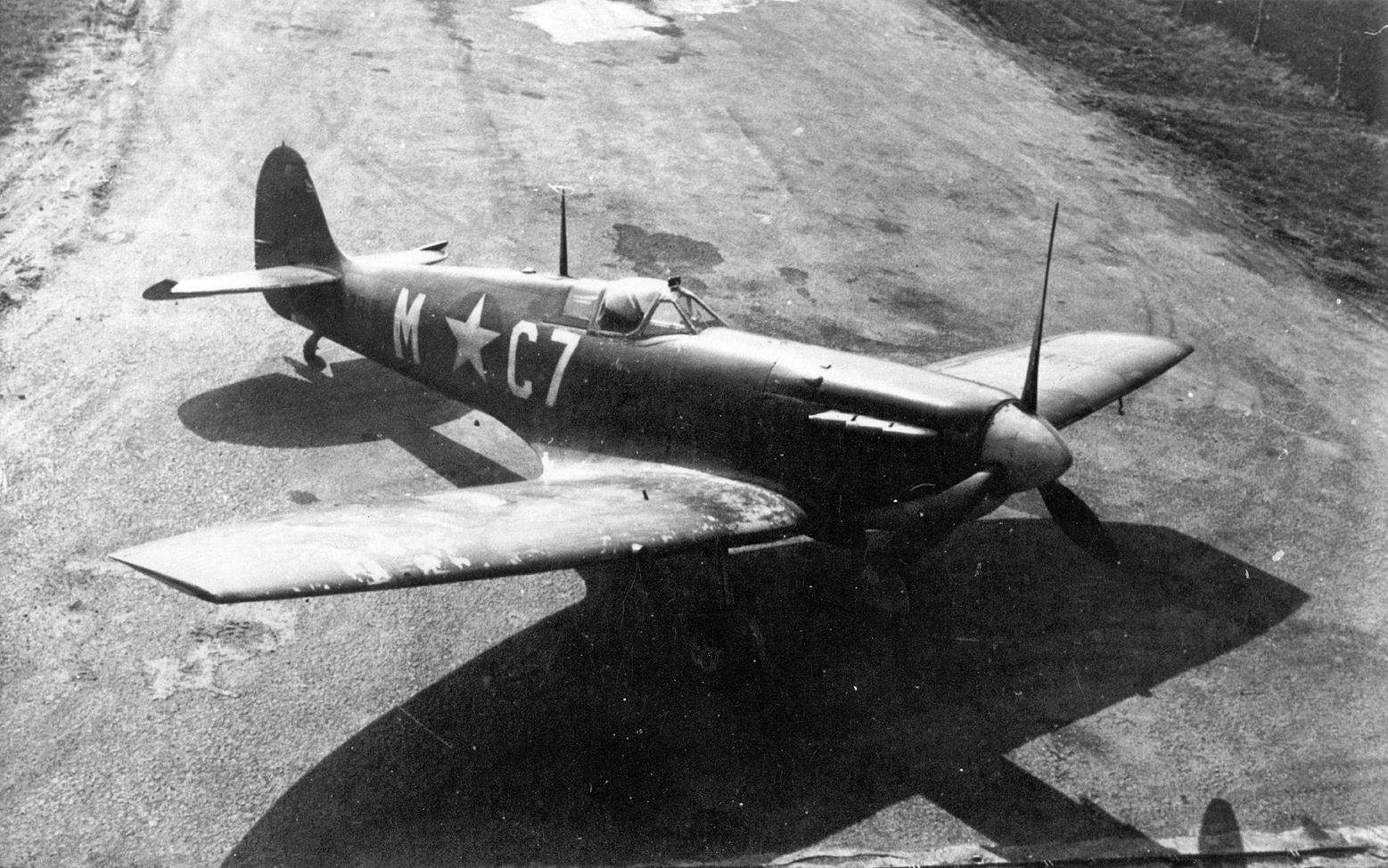
A Supermarine Spitfire Mk V of the group's 555th FTS, Goxhill, 1944

On 1 October, the group was transferred to VIII Fighter Command, along with the 495th FTG. On 26 October, training responsibilities ceased for both the 495th and 496th Groups, as the Eighth Air Force re-established operational training units within combat fighter groups. During the months of its operation of the CCRC, the group graduated 2,434 out of 2,481 trainees. Seven students were seriously injured and 23 were killed in 117 major accidents, with 53 aircraft lost. On 18 November, the 2d Tow Target and Gunnery Flight was transferred to Leiston (AAF Station 373). In early December, the 554th Squadron was transferred to Raydon (AAF Station 157) with the 353d Fighter Group. The detachments from the 333d Service Group and the 1148th Quartermaster Company were transferred to the 1st Bombardment Division, but remained with the 496th. The group itself was reassigned to the 65th Fighter Wing of the 2d Bombardment Division (renamed the 2d Air Division in February 1945). On 15 December, the group completed its move to Halesworth (AAF Station 365), replacing the 489th Bombardment Group there.

Until its inactivation in April 1945, the group provided manpower, maintenance, and support services for units based at Halesworth. Units based at Halesworth included the 5th Emergency Rescue Squadron, an air-sea rescue unit, the 1st Tow Target and Gunnery Flight, a target towing unit, and the 2d Weather and Relay Flight, a weather observation unit. On 26 April, the 496th was inactivated. The rescue squadron and the other units were directly subordinated to the 65th Fighter Wing. Remaining personnel were transferred to the 332d Air Service Squadron pending the end of combat in the European Theater of Operations and reassignment or discharge.
