= RAF Leiston =

Former Royal Air Force station in Suffolk, England

RAF Leiston USAAF Station 373
- Theberton, Suffolk in England
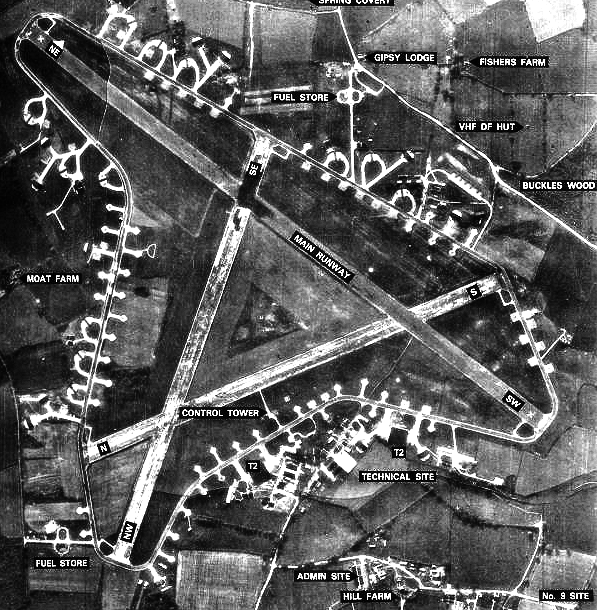
- Leiston Airfield - 12 June 1946

Site information
- Type: Royal Air Force station
- Code: LI
- Owner: Air Ministry
- Operator: Royal Air Force; United States Army Air Forces

Location
- Shown within Suffolk RAF Leiston (the United Kingdom)
- Coordinates: 52°13′20″N 001°33′20″E

Site history
- Built: 1942-43
- In use: 1942 - 1955
- Battles/wars: European theatre of World War II

Airfield information
- Elevation: 24 metres (79 ft) AMSL
Runways
Direction	Length and surface
06/24	1,830 metres (6,004 ft) Concrete/asphalt
13/31	1,280 metres (4,199 ft) Concrete/asphalt
18/36	1,280 metres (4,199 ft) Concrete/asphalt

Royal Air Force Leiston or more simply RAF Leiston is a former Royal Air Force station located 1.5 km (0.93 mi) northwest of Leiston and 1 km (0.62 mi) south of Theberton, Suffolk, England.

== History ==
=== USAAF use ===
Originally intended as a fighter station for RAF Fighter Command, RAF Leiston airfield (actually located in Theberton) was allocated to the Eighth Air Force of the United States Army Air Forces (USAAF) on 22 September 1942 and designated Station 373 (LI).

The airfield was constructed to Class A airfield standards between September 1942 and September 1943 by John Mowlem and Company Ltd. and first occupied by the USAAF in October 1943. Leiston's proximity to the coast meant that the airfield was used on many occasions by battle-damaged aircraft returning from operations over Europe. The first aircraft to land on the airfield - while it was still under construction - are believed to have been two Boeing B-17 Flying Fortresses which were returning from operations on 30 July 1943. One aircraft nearly hit a contractor's vehicle when coming in to land as some of the runways were still partly obstructed by tree stumps and other materials.

The three runways were concrete overlaid with asphalt, with 62 aircraft dispersals (38 concrete pans and 12 twin pens with blast walls) situated along its perimeter track. The USAAF added 17 PSP parking squares and a walled 6-plane revetment for additional aircraft parking. Support structures included two T-2 hangars (each 239 1/2 × 115 × 29 ft (73.0 × 35.1 × 8.8 m) in dimension) and 12 corrugated steel 60 ft (18 m) wide Over Blister hangars dispersed on all sides of the perimeter track. The ten living sites located west of the airfield had a capacity for 1,709 personnel.

==== 358th Fighter Group ====
The 358th Fighter Group arrived at Leiston from RAF Goxhill on 29 November 1943 after completing training. The group was assigned to the 66th Fighter Wing of the VIII Fighter Command. Aircraft of the group were identified by yellow cowlings.

The group consisted of the following squadrons:

- 365th Fighter Squadron (CH)
- 366th Fighter Squadron (IA)
- 367th Fighter Squadron (CP)

The 358th FG began operations on 20 December 1943 and engaged in escort work until April 1944 to cover the operations of Boeing B-17 Flying Fortress/Consolidated B-24 Liberator bombers that the USAAF sent against targets on the Continent. On 31 January 1944 the group relocated to RAF Raydon near Ipswich and became part of the Ninth Air Force, which in turn transferred the North American P-51 Mustang-equipped 357th Fighter Group from Raydon to the Eighth Air Force.

==== 357th Fighter Group ====
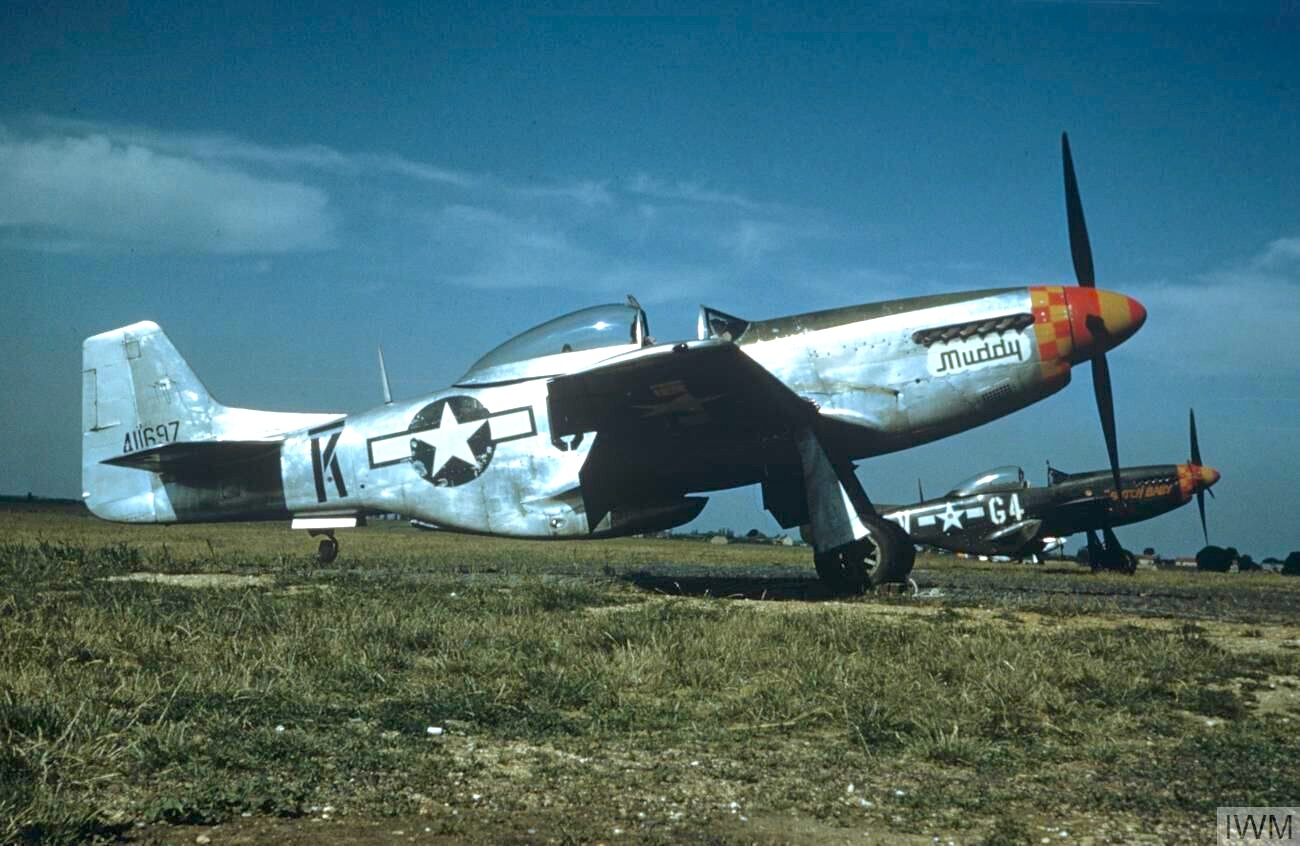
P-51D Mustangs of the 362d Fighter Squadron. Muddy, s/n 44-14697, in foreground (2d Lt. James Gasser) and Butch Baby, s/n 44-14798, in background (2nd Lt. J.H. Bertram)

The 357th Fighter Group, arrived at Leiston from RAF Raydon on 31 January 1944, replacing the P-47-equipped 358th Fighter Group in the 66th Fighter Wing, VIII Fighter Command. After March 1944 aircraft of the group were identified by red-yellow-red rings on the propeller spinner and a 12" red and yellow band around the forward part of the nose in the checkerboard pattern of the 66th Fighter Wing groups.

The group consisted of the following squadrons:

- 362d Fighter Squadron (fuselage code G4), dispersals along the 18/36 runway (357th technical site)
- 363d Fighter Squadron (code B6), dispersals along the 06/24 runway (Buckles Wood)
- 364th Fighter Squadron (code C5), dispersals along the 13/31 runway (Moat Farm)

The 357th FG served as an escort group, providing penetration, target, and withdrawal support for bombers that attacked strategic objectives on the Continent and began operations in the assault against the Luftwaffe and aircraft industry during Big Week, 20–25 February 1944.

The group received a Distinguished Unit Citation for two escort missions in which heavy opposition was encountered from enemy fighters: on 6 March 1944 provided target and withdrawal support during the first attack that heavy bombers of Eighth AF made on Berlin. On 29 June 1944 the group protected bombers that struck targets at Leipzig. The unit received second DUC for operations on 14 January 1945 when the group, covering 3rd Division B-17's on a raid to synthetic oil plants at Derben broke up an attack by a large force of interceptors and in the ensuing aerial battle destroyed 56.5 German fighters (later credited as 55.5), the largest number of claims by any Eighth Air Force group on a single mission.

In addition to escort the 357th conducted counter-air patrols, made fighter sweeps, and flew strafing and dive-bombing missions in which it attacked airfields, marshalling yards, locomotives, bridges, barges, tugboats, highways, vehicles, fuel dumps, and other targets. It participated in the invasion of Normandy in June 1944, the breakthrough at Saint-Lô in July, the Battle of the Bulge, December 1944–January 1945, and the airborne assault across the Rhine in March 1945.

The group flew its last mission, an escort operation, on 25 April 1945 and moved to Neubiberg, Germany on 21 July and was assigned to United States Air Forces in Europe for duty with the army of occupation.

357th FG aces Chuck Yeager (the man who broke the sound barrier) and Bud Anderson were stationed in Leiston. Cpt. James Browning, an ace assigned to the 363rd FS, was also stationed here until his death over the Fulda Gap in 1945.

=== Postwar use ===
After the Americans departed for occupation duty, Leiston was returned to the RAF on 10 October 1945 and until 1953 it was known as No. 18 Recruit Centre, RAF Technical Training Command. With the closure of the recruit centre Leiston was placed into care and maintenance status, then closed for good in 1955. Parts of the airfield were sold during the late 1950s and 60s, with the last pieces being returned to the public in 1965.

== Current use ==
Today Leiston airfield is virtually unrecognisable. The airfield area itself, has largely been returned to agriculture except for the Cakes & Ale Park, about 1/3 of the main runway and a short section of perimeter track further down Harrow Lane. The NW runway still exists in its full length but has been reduced to a width of about 4 m (13 ft) and cannot be viewed from public roads.

A few old buildings still exist on the airfield and also on a domestic site but most are overgrown with vegetation and are in poor condition.

== See also ==
- List of former Royal Air Force stations
