= Pontorson Airfield =

Pontorson Airfield Advanced Landing Ground (ALG) A-28
- Basse-Normandie Region, France

Site information
- Type: Military airfield
- Controlled by: United States Army Air Forces

Location
- Coordinates: 48°32′57″N 001°29′18″W

Site history
- Built by: IX Engineering Command
- In use: August–September 1944
- Materials: Prefabricated Hessian Surfacing (PHS)
- Battles/wars: Western Front (World War II); Northern France Campaign

Pontorson Airfield is an abandoned World War II military airfield, which is located near the commune of Pontorson in the Normandy region of northern France.

Located just outside Pontorson (likely to the northeast), the United States Army Air Force established a temporary airfield on 7 August 1944, shortly after the Allied landings in France The airfield was constructed by the IX Engineering Command, 819th Engineer Aviation Battalion.

== History ==
Known as Advanced Landing Ground "A-28", the airfield consisted of a single 5000' (1500m) Prefabricated Hessian Surfacing/Compressed Earth runway (3600 PHS/1400 ETH) aligned 08/26. In addition, tents were used for billeting and also for support facilities; an access road was built to the existing road infrastructure; a dump for supplies, ammunition, and gasoline drums, along with a drinkable water and minimal electrical grid for communications and station lighting.

The 358th Fighter Group, based P-47 Thunderbolts fighters at Pontorson from 14 August though 14 September 1944.

The fighter planes flew support missions during the Allied invasion of Normandy, patrolling roads in front of the beachhead; strafing German military vehicles and dropping bombs on gun emplacements, anti-aircraft artillery and concentrations of German troops in Normandy and Brittany when spotted.

After the Americans moved east into Central France with the advancing Allied Armies, the airfield was closed on 28 September 1944. Today the long dismantled airfield is indistinguishable from the agricultural fields in the area.
