= 122nd Operations Group =

122nd Operations Group

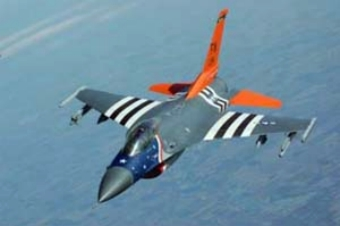
- Group F-16 Fighting Falcon in a commemorative paint scheme (Note: Painted in a heritage scheme to honor the group’s lineage back to the Second World War when it was flying Republic P-47Ds in the European Theater. 2008.)
- Active: 1943–1945; 1946–1952; 1952–1974; 1993–present
- Country: United States
- Allegiance: Indiana
- Branch: Air National Guard
- Role: Fighter
- Part of: Indiana Air National Guard
- Garrison/HQ: Fort Wayne Air National Guard Base, Indiana
- Nickname: Orange Tails
- Mottos: Conquer Above (Since 1954) With Sword and Wings (World War II)
- Engagements: European Theater of Operations
- Decorations: Distinguished Unit Citation; French Croix de Guerre with Palm

Insignia
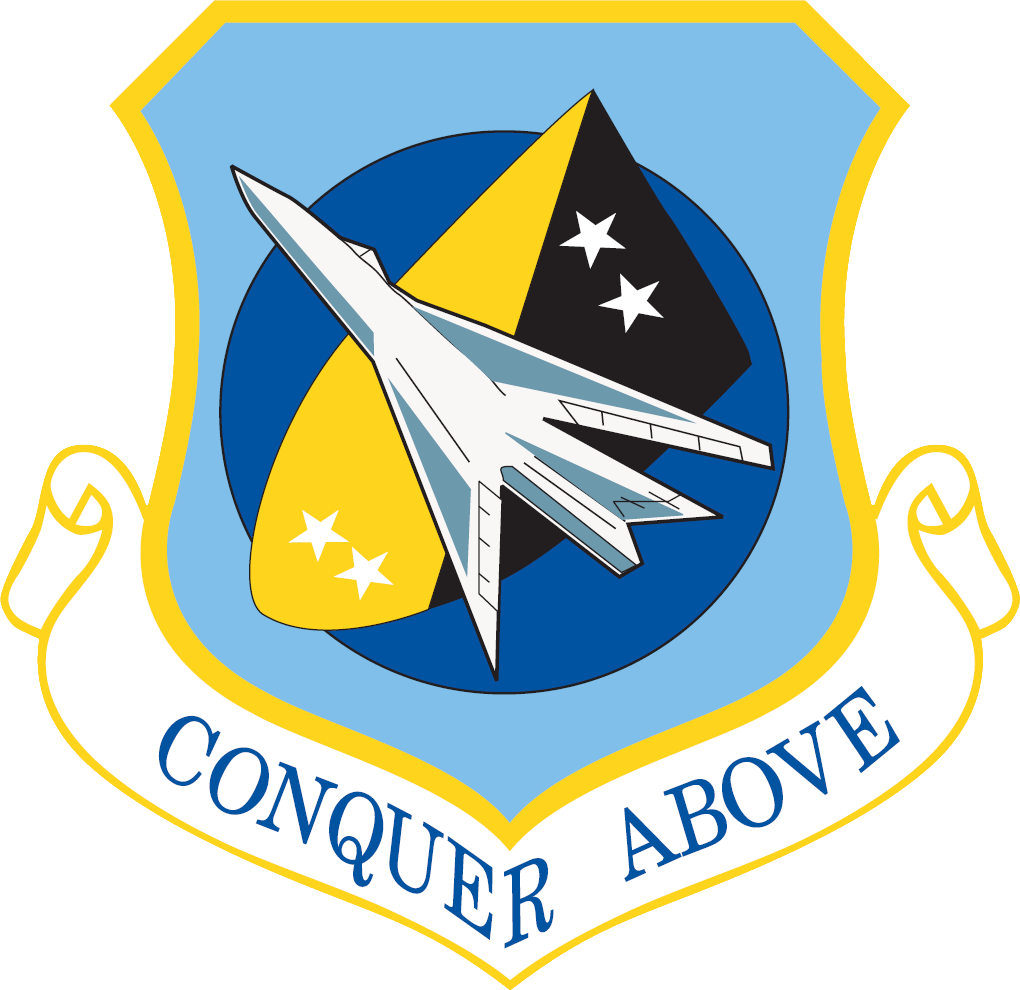
- 122nd Operations Group emblem (Note: While assigned to the 122nd Wing, the group uses the wing emblem with the group designation on the scroll. AF Instruction 84-105, Organizational Lineage, Honors and History, 27 April 2017, paragraph 3.3.3. Approved 28 July 1954. Description: azure (light blue) a bordure or (Air Force yellow), overall and saltirewise an escutcheon in prospect, (per bend or and sable, in chief four mullets of the last [color]) and a jet type aircraft with exhaust fire all proper.)

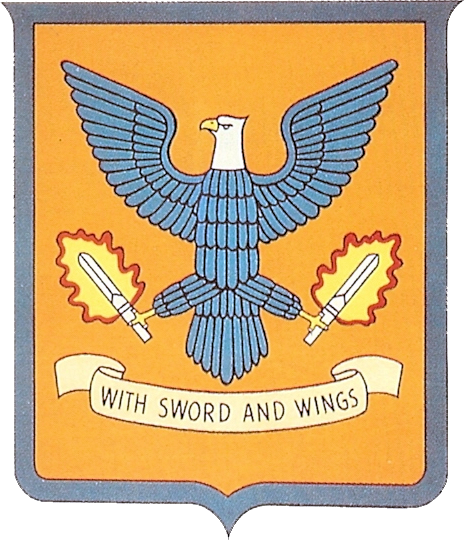
- 358th Fighter Group emblem
- Tail code: IN
- Former tail code: FW

The group was activated during World War II as the 358th Fighter Group. It trained in the United States. The group moved to England during October 1943, where it began combat operations on 20 December 1943. It served in combat with Eighth and later, Ninth Air Force until V-E Day. It earned three Distinguished Unit Citations and a French Croix de Guerre with Palm for its actions in combat. In July 1945, it returned to the United States for inactivation.

In 1946, the group was allotted to the National Guard and organized later in the year as the 122nd Fighter Group. It was called to active duty for the Korean War, serving as an air defense unit in its home state of Indiana. It returned to state control in 1952. It was again called to active service for the Berlin Crisis of 1961, although it deployed aircraft and personnel to France, they became part of another unit and the group remained in the United States. The group was inactivated in a reorganization of National Guard wings in 1974, but was again activated in 1993 as the 122nd Operations Group.

== History ==
=== World War II ===
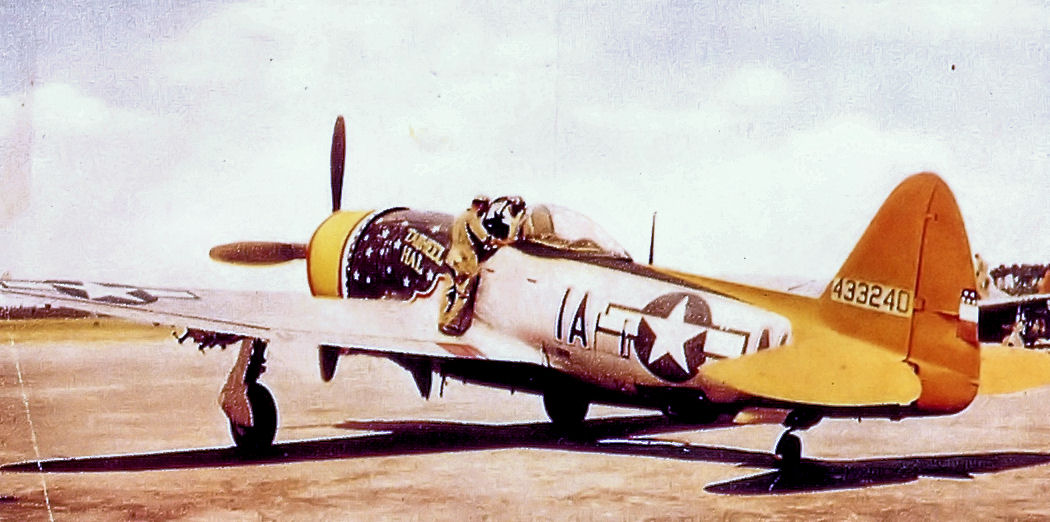
356th Fighter Squadron P-47 Thunderbolt (Note: Aircraft is Republic P-47D-30-RA Thunderbolt, Tarheel Hal IA-N, serial 44-33240. This airplane survived the war and was transferred to the 86th Fighter Group as part of the occupation forces. Dirkx, Marco (12 February 2024). "1944 USAF Serial Numbers". Joe Baugher’s Serial Number List..)

The group was first activated as the 358th Fighter Group at Richmond Army Air Base, Virginia in January 1943. It was composed of the 365th, 366th, and 367th Fighter Squadrons. Initially equipped with Curtiss P-40 Warhawks, it then trained with Republic P-47D Thunderbolts. Most of the group sailed for England on the SS Monterey on 8 October 1943, arriving at Liverpool on 20 October.

The group was initially stationed at RAF Goxhill, but moved to RAF Leiston before it flew its first combat mission on 20 December. At the end of January 1944, the group traded bases and commands with the 357th Fighter Group, a North American P-51 Mustang unit, moving to RAF Raydon and becoming part of IX Fighter Command, whose fighter units flew Thunderbolts. (Note: This was with the exception of the 354th Fighter Group, which flew Thunderbolts for a while, but flew Mustangs for most of its time in England.)

The group primarily flew missions escorting heavy bombers through April 1944. Starting that month, the group dive bombed marshalling yards to prepare for Operation Overlord, the invasion of Normandy. During May, it continued attacks on enemy lines of communication, while still flying escort missions. On D-Day and the following day, it provided cover for Douglas C-47 Skytrains dropping paratroopers on the Cotentin Peninsula. and attacked trains, vehicles, and enemy troop concentrations for the rest of the month. In July, it moved to Cretteville Airfield, France, from which it supported Operation Cobra, the breakout at Saint Lo. It continued to fly close air support and interdiction missions during the Allied drive across northern France and into Germany. For its contributions to the liberation of France, the French government awarded the 358th the French Croix de Guerre with Palm.

From 24 December 1944 to 2 January 1945, the group destroyed numerous Luftwaffe fighters participating in Operation Bodenplatte, the German attempt to cripple Allied tactical air forces by destroying their forward airfields. It simultaneously attacked rail lines, rolling stock, vehicles, and artillery batteries supporting Seventh Army during the Battle of the Bulge. For these actions, it was awarded a Distinguished Unit Citation (DUC).

On 19 and 20 March 1945, the group destroyed or damaged large numbers of motor vehicles that the German Army was using in an attempt to evacuate its forces west of the Rhine River, severely hampering their operation. These attacks earned the group a second DUC. During the closing month of air combat in Europe, from 8 to 25 April 1945, the group attacked enemy airfields near Munich and Ingolstadt. It engaged remaining Luftwaffe forces in aerial combat, while continuing attacks on ground targets, earning a third DUC.

Following V-E Day, The group departed Europe in July 1945. It arrived at La Junta Army Air Field on 3 August, where it was inactivated on 7 November.

=== National Guard ===
In May 1946, the group was redesignated the 122nd Fighter Group and allotted to the National Guard. It was organized later in the year. In 1950, the Guard reorganized its combat units under the Wing Base Organization, and the group became the operational element of the new 122nd Fighter Wing. The wing and group were called to active duty in February 1951 as the 122nd Fighter-Interceptor Group and wing, serving in the air defense of the midwest. However, Air Defense Command (ADC) was experiencing difficulty under the wing base organizational structure in deploying fighter squadrons to the best advantage. As a result, the 122nd was inactivated in February 1952, and its operational squadrons were transferred to regional air defense organizations.

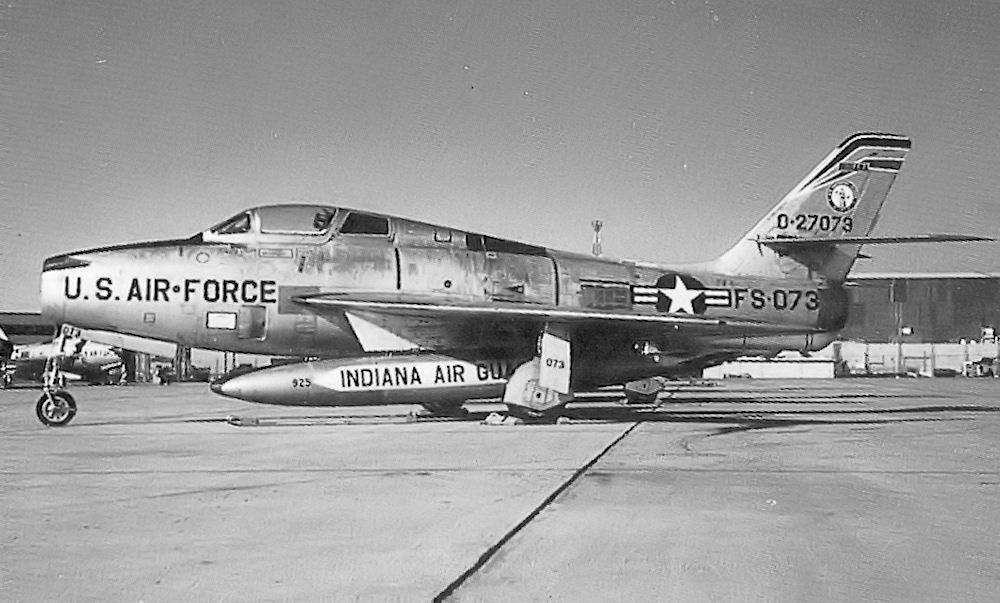
Group F-84F Thunderstreak (Note: Aircraft is Republic F-84F-40-RE Thunderstreak, serial 52-7073. This airplance was later transferred to the Royal Hellenic Air Force. Dirkx, Marco (23 September 2025). "1952 USAF Serial Numbers". Joe Baugher’s Serial Number List..)

The group returned to the National Guard and was activated on 1 November 1952 as the 122nd Fighter-Bomber Group. Despite its new name, its mission remained augmenting ADC. This mission was recognized by a return to its fighter-interceptor designation in July 1955. In 1958, Its mission changed and it became the 122nd Tactical Fighter Group. In 1961, the group was again mobilized for the Berlin Crisis of 1961. Although it was planned to deploy the entire group to France, due to budget reductions, only its 163rd Tactical Fighter Squadron deployed to Chambley Air Base, where it became the operational element of the 7122nd Tactical Fighter Wing. Although other group members deployed to the 7122nd, the group and its headquarters remained in Indiana. The 163rd mission was to provide close air support for the Seventh Army. In May 1962, deployed members of the 122nd began to return from Chambley. However, the group's deployed Republic F-84F Thunderstreaks remained and were transferred to the 390th Tactical Fighter Squadron, which was activated to replace the 163rd.

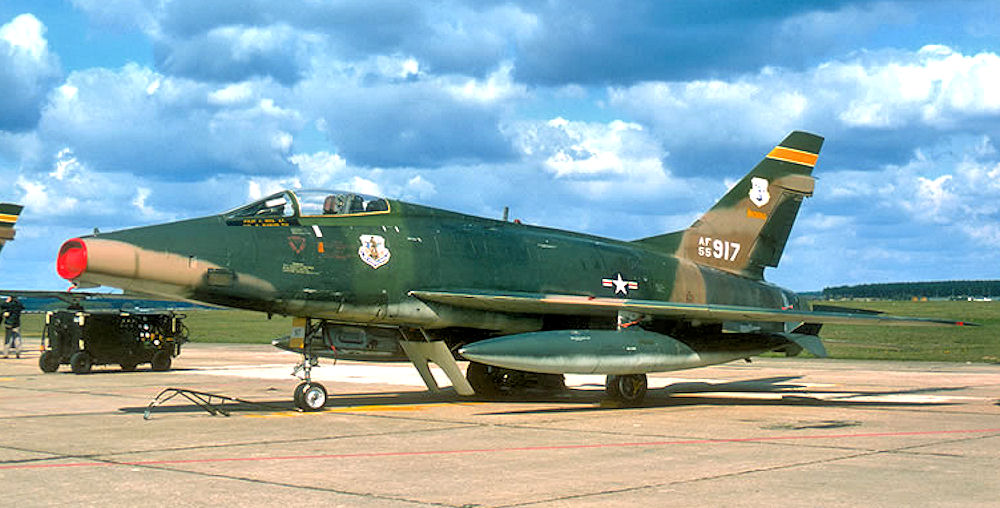
Group F-100D Super Sabre (Note: Aircraft is North American F-100D-45-NH Super Sabre, serial 55-2917. This aircraft was sent to the Military Aircraft Storage and Disposition Center on 31 May 1971. It was converted to a QF-100 target drone and shot down on 9 November 1990. Dirkx, Marco (23 September 2025). "1955 USAF Serial Numbers". Joe Baugher’s Serial Number List..)

Because it was not practical to put an entire wing on a single installation for day-to-day operations, group squadrons were located on bases as “augmented squadrons” containing support elements needed to sustain operations. By the law at the time Guardsmen could only be activated as members of a mobilized unit. This meant that, even if only operational and maintenance elements were needed for mobilization, the entire “augmented squadron” had to be called to active duty, including unneeded administrative personnel. The response was to replace the “augmented squadron” with a group including functional squadrons that could be mobilized as a group, or individually. In this reorganization, group squadrons not located at Baer Field were assigned to newly activated groups, and only the 163rd Tactical Fighter Squadron and support elements at Baer were assigned to the group. In 1974, the Air Force decided that tactical groups located on the same base as their parent wings constituted an additional and unneeded layer of management. As a result, on 9 December 1974, the group was inactivated and its elements were assigned directly to the wing.

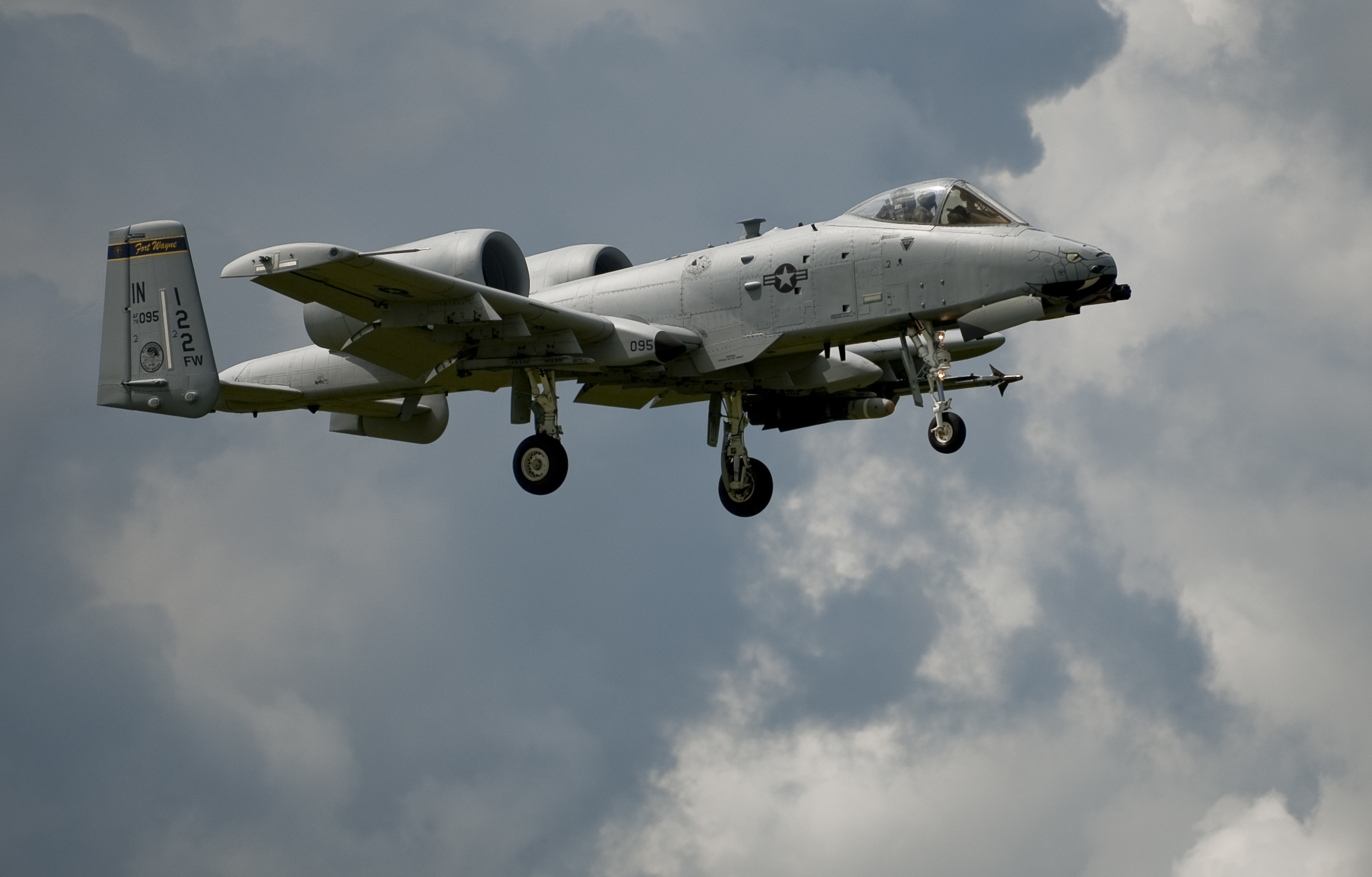
Group A-10 Thunderbolt II

In 1992, the Air National Guard began to reorganize along the line of the Objective Wing Model. The group was redesignated the 122nd Operations Group and once again became the operational element of the 122nd Wing. It has flown General Dynamics F-16 Fighting Falcon, except for the period from 2010 to 2023, when it flew Fairchild Republic A-10 Thunderbolt IIs.

== Lineage ==
- Constituted as the 358th Fighter Group on 20 December 1942

Activated on 1 January 1943
Inactivated on 7 November 1945
Redesignated 122nd Fighter Group and allotted to the National Guard on 24 May 1946
Activated on 16 October 1946
Extended federal recognition on 9 December 1946
Redesignated 122nd Fighter-Interceptor Group on 1 February 1951
Ordered to active service on 10 February 1951
Inactivated on 7 February 1952
Redesignated 122nd Fighter-Bomber Group and activated in the National Guard on 1 November 1952
Redesignated 122nd Fighter-Interceptor Group on 1 July 1955
Redesignated 122nd Tactical Fighter Group on 1 November 1958
Ordered into active service on 1 October 1961
Released from active service on 31 August 1962
Inactivated on 9 December 1974
Redesignated 122nd Operations Group
Activated on 1 January 1993

=== Assignments ===
- I Fighter Command, 1 January–September 1943 (attached to Philadelphia Fighter Wing, after 28 April 1943)
- VIII Fighter Command), 21 October 1943
- 66th Fighter Wing, November 1944
- IX Fighter Command, 31 January 1944
- 71st Fighter Wing (attached to IX Tactical Air Command), 1 August 1944
- 70th Fighter Wing (attached to IX Tactical Air Command), 1 October 1944
- XIX Tactical Air Command, 16 January–July 1945
- Second Air Force, 3 August – 7 November 1945
- Indiana National Guard, 16 October 1946
- 55th Fighter Wing, 7 December 1947
- 66th Fighter Wing, August 1948
- 71st Fighter Wing, December 1948
- 55th Fighter Wing, c. 1950
- 122nd Fighter Wing (later 122nd Fighter-Interceptor Wing) c. 1 November 1950 – 7 February 1952
- 122nd Fighter-Bomber Wing (later 122nd Fighter-Interceptor Wing, 122nd Tactical Fighter Wing), 1 November 1952 – 9 December 1974
- 122nd Fighter Wing, c. 1 January 1993 – present

=== Components ===
- 112th Fighter Squadron (later 112th Fighter-Interceptor, 112th Tactical Fighter Squadron), 1 October 1961 – 30 September 1962
- 113th Fighter Squadron (later 113th Fighter-Interceptor Squadron, 113th Fighter-Bomber Squadron, 113th Tactical Fighter Squadron), 17 February 1947 – 6 February 1952, – c. 1 February 1953 – 30 September 1962
- 122nd Operations Support Squadron, c. 1 January 1993 – present
- 163rd Fighter Squadron, see 365th Fighter Squadron
- 166th Fighter-Interceptor Squadron, 10 February 1951 -6 February 1952
- 365th Fighter Squadron (later 163rd Fighter Squadron, 163rd Fighter-Interceptor Squadron, 163rd Fighter-Bomber Squadron, 163rd Tactical Fighter Squadron, 163rd Fighter Squadron): 1 January 1943 – 7 November 1945, 25 August 1947 – 6 February 1952, 1 November 1952 – 1 October 1961; 31 August 1962 – 9 December 1974; c. 1 January 1993 – present
- 366th Fighter Squadron: 1 January 1943 – 7 November 1945
- 367th Fighter Squadron: 1 January 1943 – 7 November 1945

=== Stations ===
- Richmond Army Air Base, Virginia, 1 January 1943
- Baltimore Municipal Airport, Maryland, 28 April 1943
- Camp Springs Army Air Field, Maryland, 28 May 1943
- Philadelphia Airport, Pennsylvania, 16 June 1943
- Richmond Army Air Base, Virginia, 13 August – 25 September 1943
- RAF Goxhill (AAF-345), England, 20 October 1943
- RAF Leiston (AAF-373), England, 29 November 1943
- RAF Raydon (AAF-157), England, 31 January 1944
- RAF High Halden (AAF-411), England, 13 April 1944
- Cretteville Airfield (A-14), France, 3 July 1944
- Pontorson Airfield (A-28), France, 14 August 1944
- Vitry Airfield (A-67), France, 14 September 1944
- Mourmelon-le-Grand Airfield (A-80), France, 16 October 1944
- Toul-Croix De Metz Airfield (A-90), France, 9 November 1944
- Mannheim/Sandhofen Airfield (Y-79), Germany, 2 April 1945
- Reims/Champagne Airfield (A-62), France, c. 23 June–July 1945
- La Junta Army Air Field, Colorado, 3 August – 7 November 1945
- Stout Field, Indiana, 16 October 1946
- Baer Field, Indiana, 1 May 1951 – 7 February 1952
- Baer Field, Indiana, 1 November 1952 – 9 December 1974
- Fort Wayne Air National Guard Base, Indiana, c. 1 January 1993 – present

=== Aircraft ===
- Curtiss P-40 Warhawk, 1943
- Republic P-47D Thunderbolt, 1943–1945
- North American F-51D Mustang, 1946–1951
- North American F-51H Mustang, 1951–1954
- Republic F-84B Thunderjet, 1951–1952
- Lockheed F-80C Shooting Star, 1954–1956
- North American F-86A Sabre, 1956–1958
- Republic F-84F Thunderstreak, 1958–1962; 1964–1971
- Republic RF-84F Thunderflash, 1962–1964
- North American F-100 Super Sabre, 1971–1974
- General Dynamics F-16 Fighting Falcon, 1993–2010
- Fairchild Republic A-10 Thunderbolt II, 2010 – 2023
- General Dynamics F-16 Fighting Falcon, 2023 – present
