= Cretteville =

- Part of Picauville
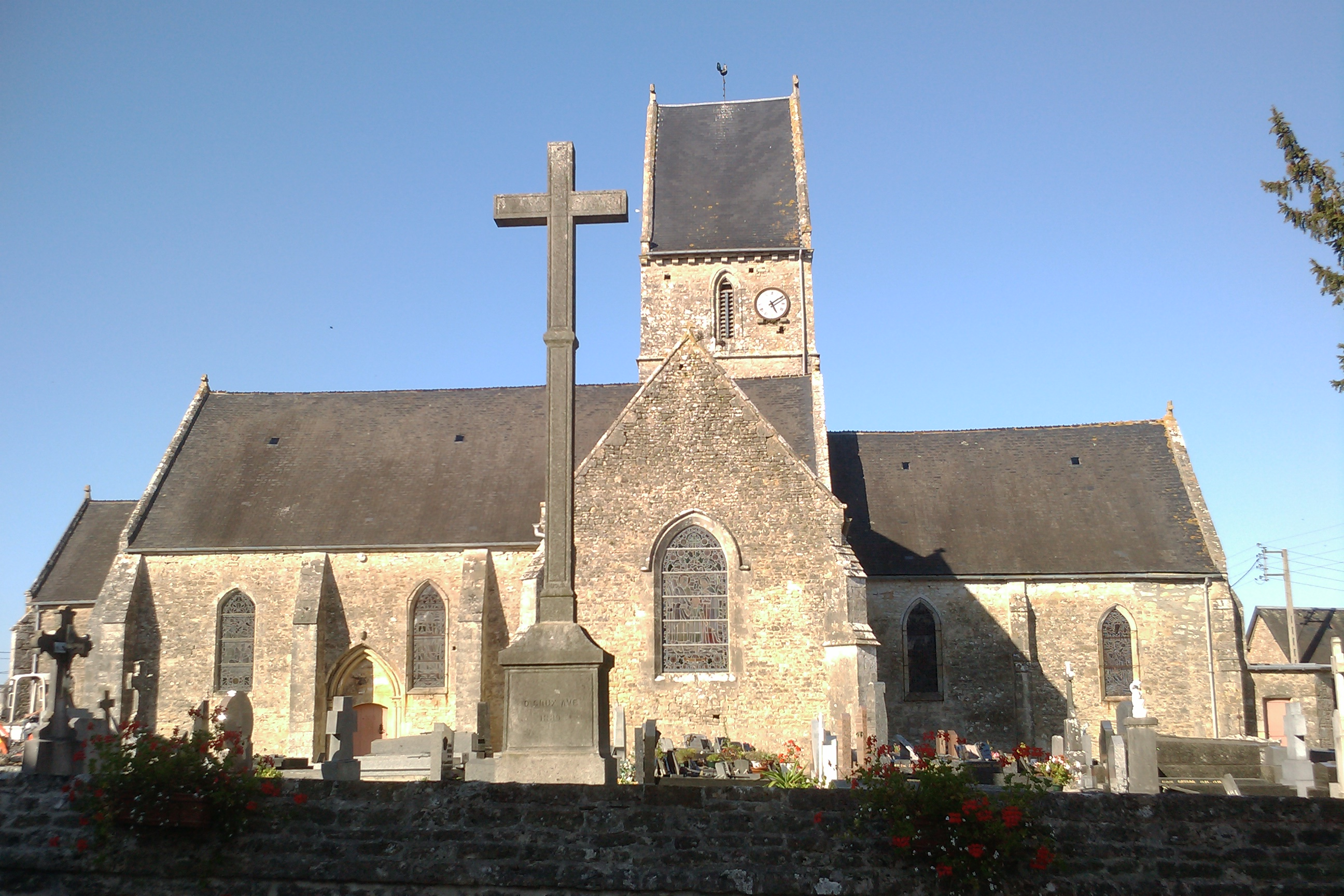
- Location of Cretteville
- Location within France Location within Normandy
- Coordinates: 49°20′35″N 1°23′19″W
- Country: France
- Region: Normandy
- Department: Manche
- Arrondissement: Cherbourg
- Canton: Carentan
- Commune: Picauville
- Area^{1}: 6.83 km^{2} (2.64 sq mi)
- Elevation: 20 m (66 ft)
- Highest elevation: 37 m (121 ft)
- Lowest elevation: 2 m (6.6 ft)
- Population (2019): 204
  - Density: 29.9/km^{2} (77.4/sq mi)
- Time zone: UTC+01:00 (CET)
  - Summer (DST): UTC+02:00 (CEST)
- Postal code: 50250
- ^{1} French Land Register data, which excludes lakes, ponds, glaciers > 1 km^{2} (0.386 sq mi or 247 acres) and river estuaries.

Cretteville (French pronunciation: [kʁɛtvil]) is a former commune in the Manche department in Normandy in north-western France. On 1 January 2016, it was merged into the commune of Picauville.

== World War II ==
After the liberation of the area by Allied Forces in 1944, engineers of the Ninth Air Force IX Engineering Command began construction of a combat Advanced Landing Ground outside of the town. Declared operational on 4 July, the airfield was designated as "A-14", it was used by the 358th Fighter Group which flew P-47 Thunderbolts until mid-August when the unit moved into Central France. The 406th Fighter Group took its place at the airfield and continued to fly P-47s until early September. Afterward, the airfield was closed.

== See also ==
- Communes of the Manche department
