= RAF Raydon =

RAF airbase in England

RAF Raydon USAAF Station 157
- Located Near Raydon, Suffolk, United Kingdom
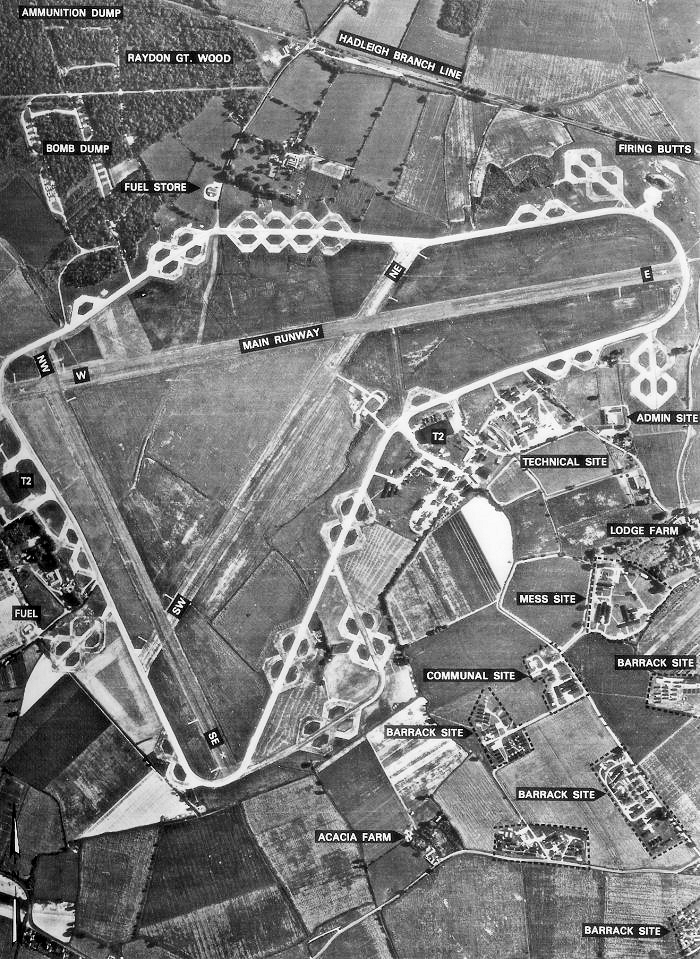
- RAF Raydon - September 1946

Site information
- Type: Military airfield
- Code: RA
- Owner: Air Ministry
- Controlled by: Royal Air Force; United States Army Air Forces

Location
- Location in Suffolk
- Coordinates: 52.011°N 1.000°E

Site history
- Built: 1942
- In use: 1942-1958
- Battles/wars: European Theatre of World War II; Air Offensive, Europe July 1942 - May 1945

Garrison information
- Garrison: Eighth Air Force; Ninth Air Force; RAF Fighter Command
- Occupants: 357th Fighter Group; 358th Fighter Group; 353rd Fighter Group

Royal Air Force Raydon or more simply RAF Raydon is a former Royal Air Force station located just to the northeast of the village of Raydon, about 6 miles (9.7 km) from Ipswich, England.

== History ==
=== Construction ===
Raydon airfield was constructed by the 833rd and 862nd Aviation Engineer Battalions. Although only ever used by fighters, Raydon airfield was constructed as a standard Class A bomber airfield. As a result, its main concrete runway was approximately 6000 ft long with two intersecting concrete runways of 4200 ft. Two T-2 type hangars were built at opposite ends of the airfield and 52 concrete dispersal points were located around the perimeter track. Accommodation for over 2800 personnel was built to the south east of the airfield.

=== USAAF use ===
Raydon was primarily a fighter station for the Eighth and Ninth United States Army Air Forces (USAAF). During the Second World War it was known as USAAF Station 157.

==== 357th Fighter Group ====
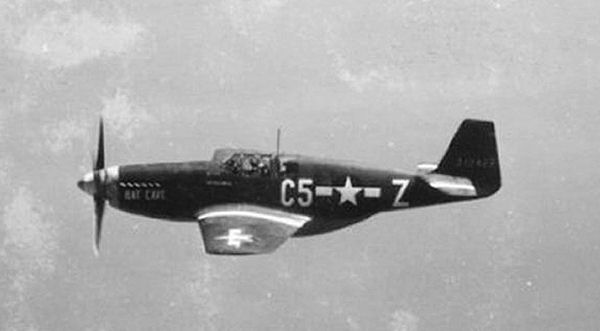
North American P-51B-1-NA Mustang Serial 43-12123 of the 364th Fighter Squadron.

The first American occupants of Raydon was the 357th Fighter Group, moving in from Casper AAF, Wyoming on 30 November 1943.

Operational squadrons of the 357th were:

- 362d Fighter Squadron (G4)
- 363d Fighter Squadron (B6)
- 364th Fighter Squadron (C5)

One pilot with the 357th was a Lt. Charles 'Chuck' Yeager.

When the group arrived at Raydon, it was assigned as part of the Ninth Air Force. On 19 December the group received their first fighter, a single North American P-51B Mustang.

==== 358th Fighter Group ====
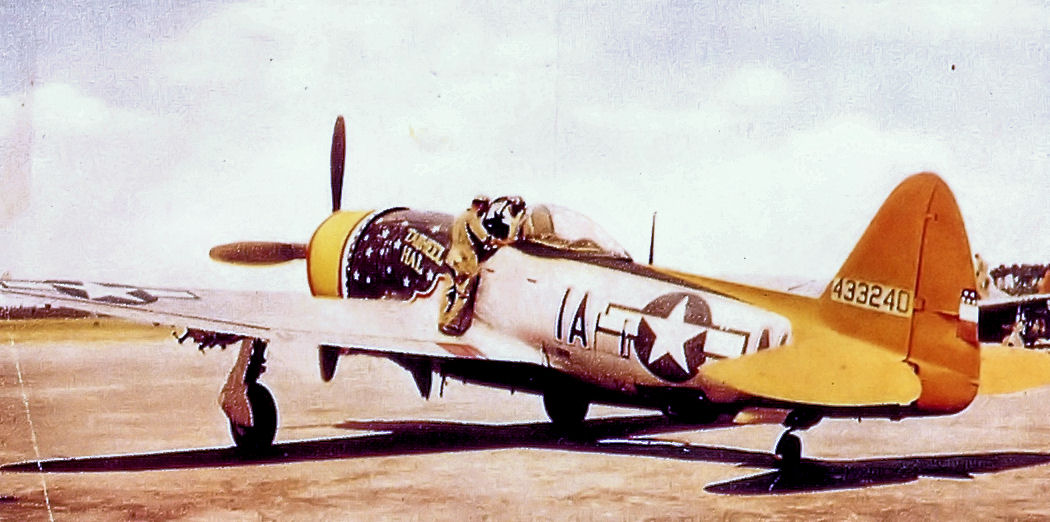
Republic P-47D-30-RA Thunderbolt Serial No. 44-33240 of the 356th Fighter Squadron

The 358th Fighter Group moved to RAF Raydon from RAF Leiston on 31 January 1944. The 358th was initially assigned to the 66th Fighter Wing, at Sawston Hall, Cambridge, then transferred to the Ninth Air Force on 1 February 1944 in exchange for the 357th FG.

Operational squadrons of the 358th were:

- 365th Fighter Squadron (CH)
- 366th Fighter Squadron (IA)
- 367th Fighter Squadron (CP)

Group markings were red, yellow and red spinners, with a 12-inch red and yellow check band around the cowling behind the spinner. Aircraft of the 357th were Republic P-47D Thunderbolts.

At RAF Raydon the group's mission was to attack enemy communications and fly escort missions with the light bomb groups of the 9th AF. On 13 April 1944 the 358th was transferred to RAF High Halden.

On 19 March 1944 a badly damaged Boeing B-17 Flying Fortress landed at Raydon due to Raydon being the first airfield the crew came across. The B-17 was B-17 #42-31968 LN:D "Miss Irish" of the 350th Bomb Squadron of the 100th Bomb Group. The aircraft's nose art was a black four leafed clover. The B-17 took a direct 88mm flak hit while on a "milk run" (easy mission) over France. The shell blew a large hole in the radio compartment and the radio operator was blown out of the aircraft. The aircraft was severely weakened around the place of impact so the remaining crew decided to land at Raydon. The B-17 was salvaged.

==== 353d Fighter Group ====
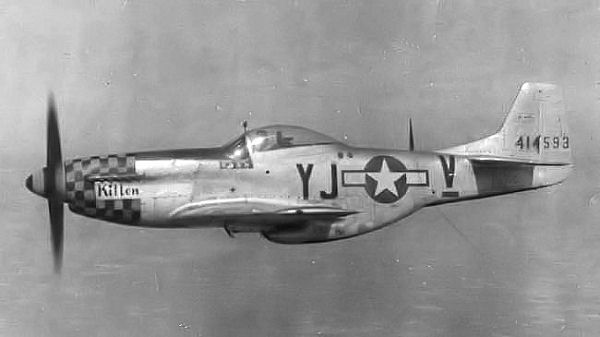
North American P-51D-10-NA MustangSerial 44-14593 of the 351st Fighter Squadron.

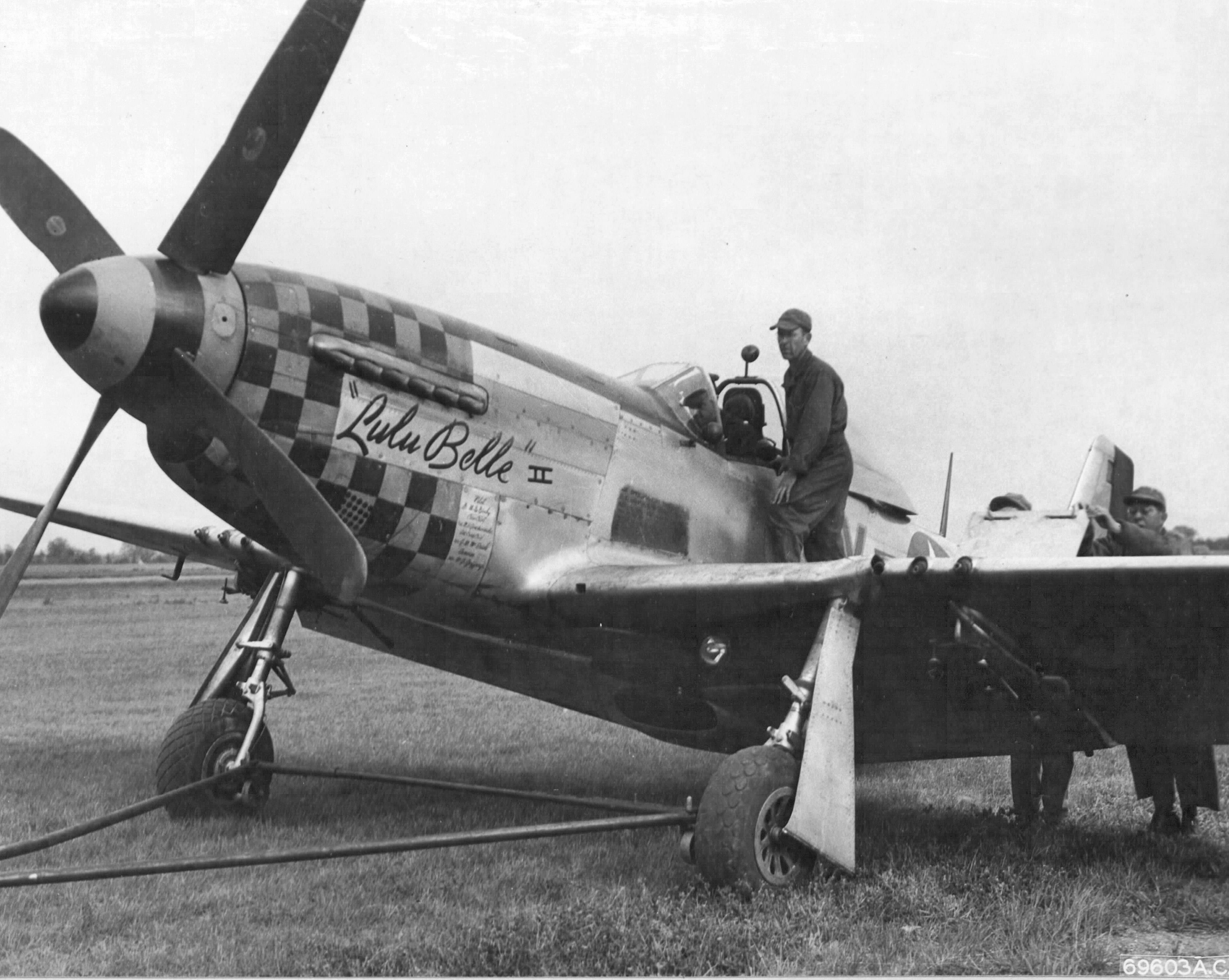
P-51D-15-NA Mustang 44-15092 "Lulu Belle II" 352d FS 353rd FG 1944 RAF Raydon, England being recovered after a landing accident while being flown by Lt Everett B Bowron. It was originally named "Alabama Rammer Jammer" and assigned to Lt Arthur C Cundy (KIA 11 March 1945).

Replacing the 9th AF 358th FG was the 353rd Fighter Group, moving in from RAF Metfeld in April 1944. The 353d was assigned to the 66th Fighter Wing, at Sawston Hall, Cambridge. The 353rd arrived at a very dirty Raydon airfield as the 358th had not cleaned after leaving.

Operational squadrons of the 353d were:

- 350th Fighter Squadron (LH)
- 351st Fighter Squadron (YJ)
- 352d Fighter Squadron (SX)

Group markings were black, yellow, black, yellow spinners, with a 48-inch black and yellow check band around the cowling to the end of the exhaust stubs. In October 1944, the group converted to the P-51 "Mustang".

The 353d flew combat missions until the end of April 1945. After the end of hostilities, the group trained and prepared for transfer to the Pacific Theater. After the end of the Second World War, in September, the group left Raydon and transferred back to Camp Kilmer, New Jersey where it was inactivated on 18 October 1945.

Whilst the 353rd occupied Raydon airfield, a B-17 Flying Fortress belonging to the 91st Bomb Group made an emergency landing at Raydon on 3 November 1944. The B-17 - a member of the 324th Bomb Squadron - went by the name of "Little Patches" and was piloted by 2nd Lt Charles Buchanan on a mission to Merseburg upon which it sustained serious flak damage.

A Consolidated B-24H Liberator of the 34th Bomb Group also made an emergency landing at Raydon on 26 June 1944.

=== RAF Fighter Command use ===
After the Americans left, Raydon was transferred back to RAF Fighter Command on 20 December 1945. The airfield remained under RAF control but was not used for any flying units. In 1952, a small part of the airfield was sold for agricultural use, and the station was closed on 8 August 1958.

During 1960/62 the Air Ministry sold the remaining airfield parts of RAF Raydon to agricultural interests, retaining most of the technical site for storage of emergency vehicles by the Home Office. They were given up and sold in the 1980s.

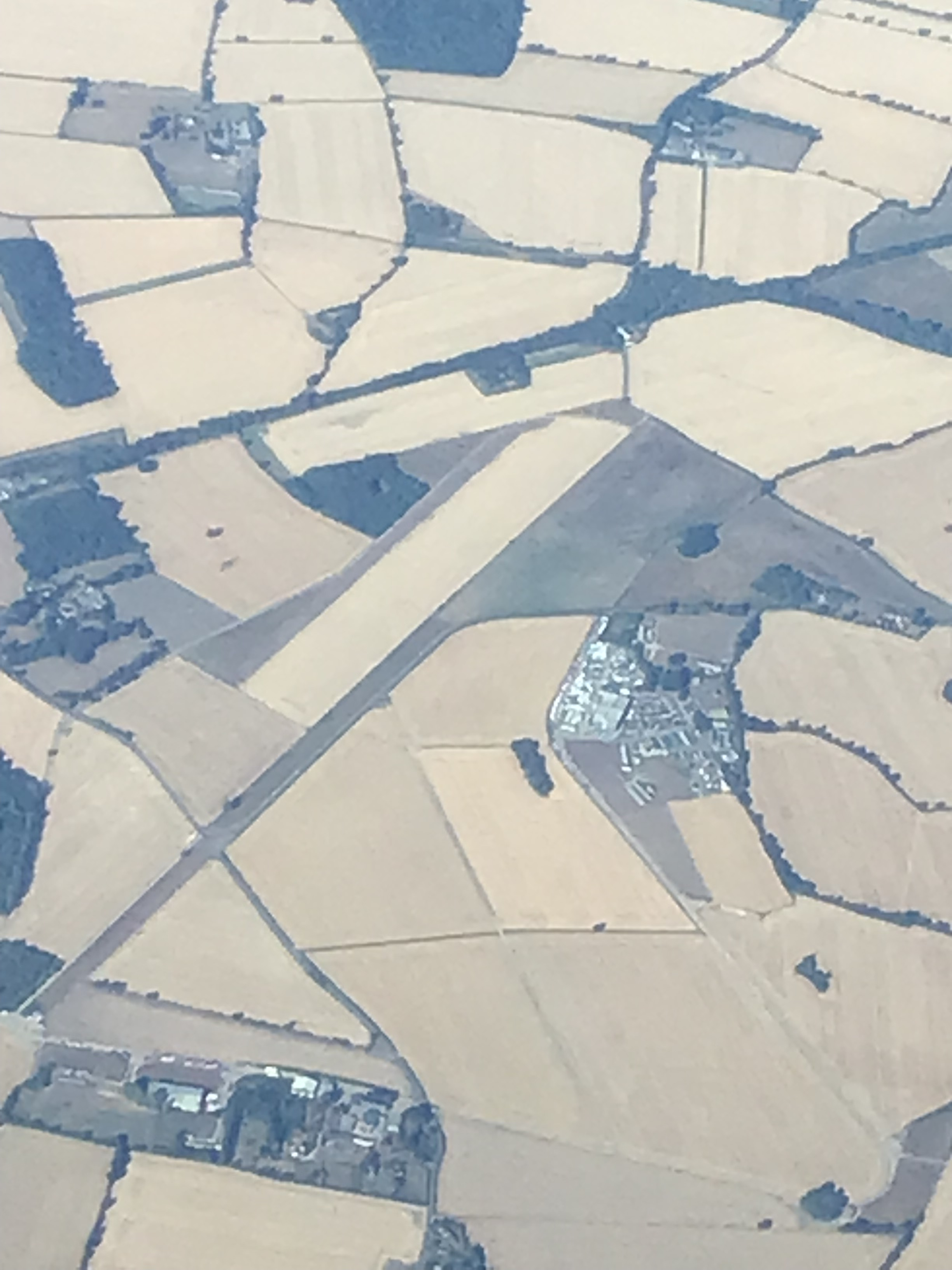
RAF Raydon (August, 2022)

== Current use ==
Raydon is one of the more complete Second World War USAAF airfield (bases) in East Anglia that was not also used by the United States Air Force during the Cold War. After the end of military control, Raydon was converted into Notley Industrial Park. The buildings that remain are largely unaltered in appearance, including the old technical site. Two T-2 hangars are in very good condition, one used by a farmer and the other used for car storage.

Some of the taxiways and part of the main runway are still intact. The rifle butts are also extant, although heavily overgrown with foliage. Unfortunately the control tower and many concrete sections of the airfield were removed in the 1960s, being used to construct the A12 road.

== See also ==
- List of former Royal Air Force stations
