= RAF High Halden =

Defunct airport in Kent, England

RAF High Halden USAAF Station AAF-411
- Near High Halden, Kent in England
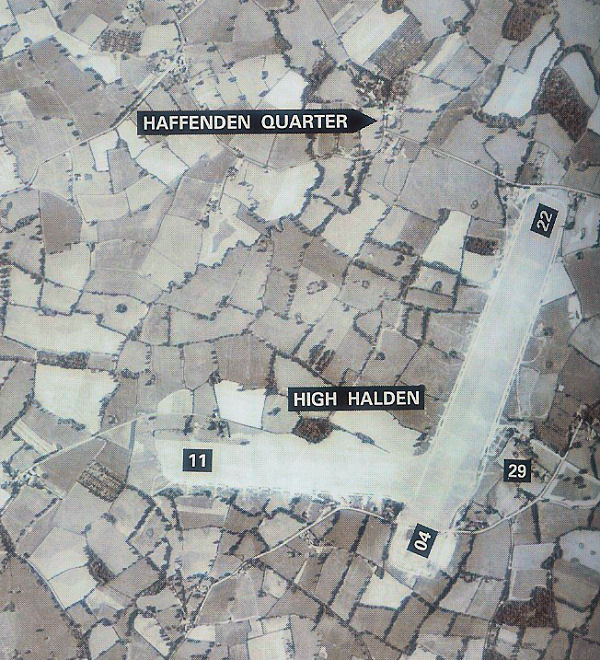
- High Halden airfield, July 1945. The ALG's laid down in southern England had two runways, while the ones laid down in France after the invasion generally had only one strip laid down east-west for speed of construction.

Site information
- Type: RAF Advanced landing ground
- Owner: Air Ministry
- Operator: United States Army Air Forces 1944; Royal Air Force 1944

Location
- Shown within Kent RAF High Halden (the United Kingdom)
- Coordinates: 51°07′17″N 000°42′16″E

Site history
- Built: 1943
- In use: 1944-1944
- Battles/wars: European theatre of World War II

Airfield information
- Elevation: 12 metres (39 ft) AMSL
Runways
Direction	Length and surface
04/22	1,353 metres (4,439 ft) Sommerfeld Tracking
11/29	1,170 metres (3,839 ft) Sommerfeld Tracking

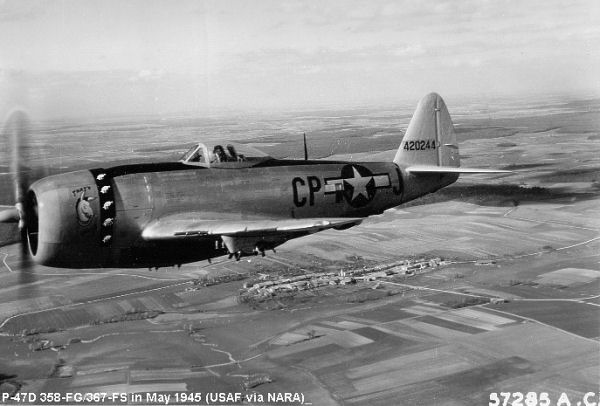
Republic P-47D-28-RE Thunderbolt Serial 44-20244 of the 367th Fighter Squadron

Royal Air Force High Halden or more simply RAF High Halden is a former Royal Air Force Advanced landing ground in Kent, England. The airfield is located approximately 8 miles (13 km) west-southwest of Ashford.

Opened in 1944, Ashford was a prototype for the type of temporary Advanced Landing Ground type airfield which would be built in France after D-Day, when the need for advanced landing fields would become urgent as the Allied forces moved east across France and Germany. It was used by the United States Army Air Forces. It was closed in September 1944.

Today the airfield is a mixture of agricultural fields with no recognisable remains.

== History ==
The USAAF Ninth Air Force required several temporary Advanced Landing Ground (ALG) along the channel coast prior to the June 1944 Normandy invasion to provide tactical air support for the ground forces landing in France.

=== USAAF use ===
High Halden was known as USAAF Station AAF-411 for security reasons by the USAAF during the war, and by which it was referred to instead of location. Its USAAF Station Code was "HH".

==== 358th Fighter Group ====
An advance party of the 358th Fighter Group moved into High Halden airfield in on 13 April 1944 from RAF Raydon. Operational squadrons of the 358th were:

- 365th Fighter Squadron (CH)
- 366th Fighter Squadron (IA)
- 367th Fighter Squadron (CP)

The group was assigned to the XIX Tactical Air Command, 100th Fighter Wing.

The 358th began movement to the ALG at Cretteville France (ALG A-14) on 29 June, however the group continued to operate from High Halden until 16 July with the remainder of the ground support personnel leaving on the 18th.

== Current use ==
With the facility released from military control the airfield area was returned to the farmers, which put it back into agricultural use.

Today, the area is unrecognizable as an airfield. High Halden's precise location can only be determined by matching the secondary roads in the area with those visible on aerial photography taken during the airfields active use. Close examination of recent aerial photography shows some evidence of scarring on the landscape that still exists, which align with the NE/SW runway. In the local area, a few outward traces remain of the airfield, consisting of some metal PSP that was used for fencing.

A memorial to those who served at the airfield has been erected close to the northern end of the 04/22 runway on Bethersden Road.

== See also ==
- List of former Royal Air Force stations
