= RAF Goxhill =

Former Air Force station, UK

RAF Goxhill USAAF Station 345
- Goxhill, Lincolnshire in England
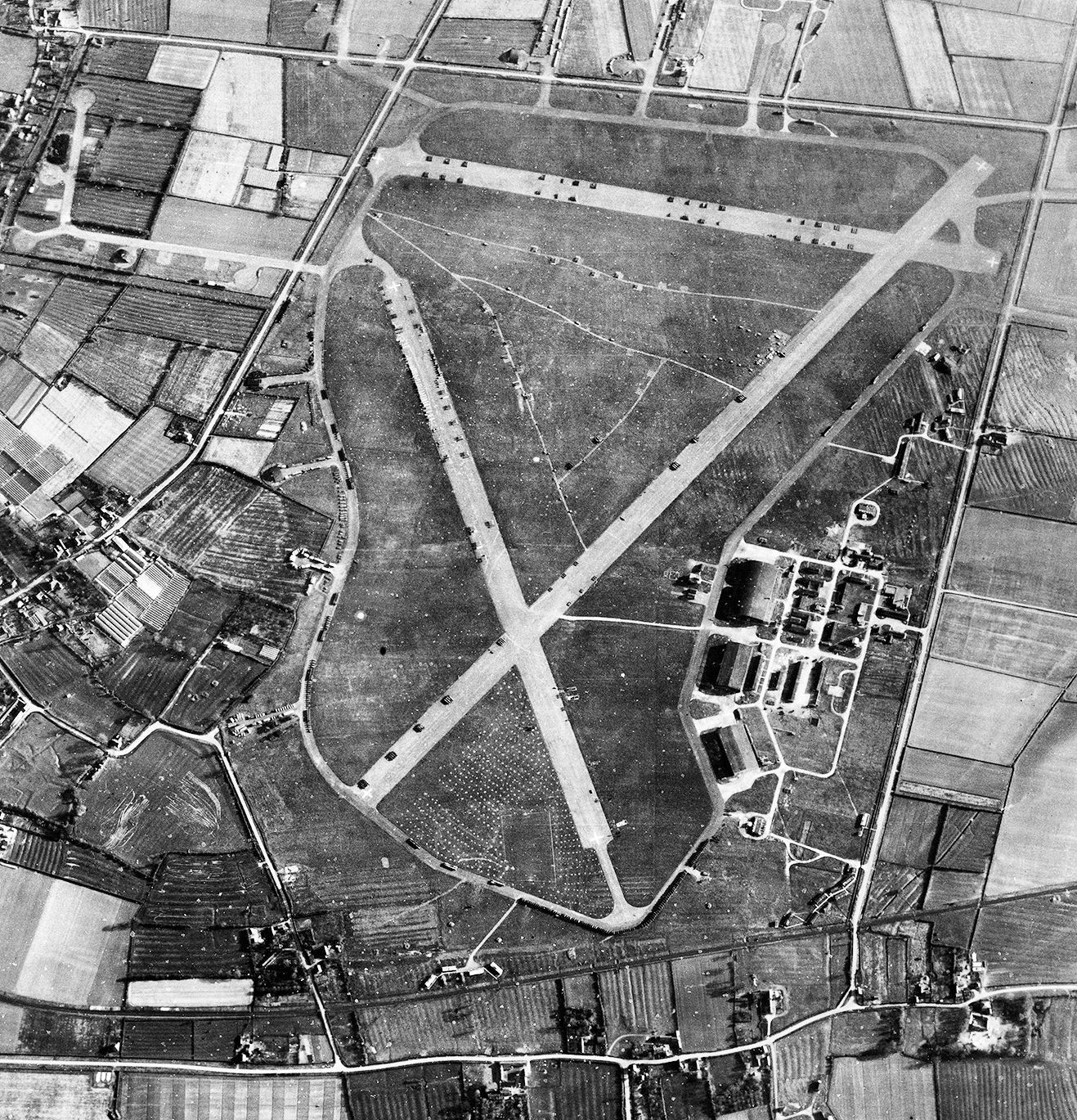
- RAF Aerial photograph of Goxhill airfield. taken on 29 April 1947. The runways are blocked with different types of equipment. Also, the control tower and technical site with two T2 hangars and a J-Type hangar is on the right.

Site information
- Type: Royal Air Force station
- Code: GX
- Owner: Air Ministry
- Operator: Royal Air Force; United States Army Air Forces
- Controlled by: RAF Bomber Command 1941 * No. 1 Group RAF; RAF Fighter Command 1941-42 * No. 12 Group RAF; 1945- Eighth Air Force; Ninth Air Force; RAF Maintenance Command

Location
- Shown within Lincolnshire RAF Goxhill (the United Kingdom)
- Coordinates: 53°40′40″N 000°18′56″W

Site history
- Built: 1940/41
- Built by: John Laing & Son Ltd
- In use: June 1941 - December 1953
- Battles/wars: European theatre of World War II

Airfield information
- Identifiers: WMO: (grid reference TA110210)
- Elevation: 6 metres (20 ft) AMSL
Runways
Direction	Length and surface
00/00	Tarmac
00/00	Tarmac
00/00	Tarmac

Royal Air Force Goxhill or RAF Goxhill is a former Royal Air Force station located east of Goxhill, on the south bank of the Humber Estuary in north Lincolnshire, England, opposite the city of Kingston upon Hull.

== Origins ==
During the First World War a Royal Flying Corps landing ground existed near the Lincolnshire village of Goxhill. In 1940 the Air Ministry returned to survey the land once again for its suitability as an airfield.

== Royal Air Force use ==
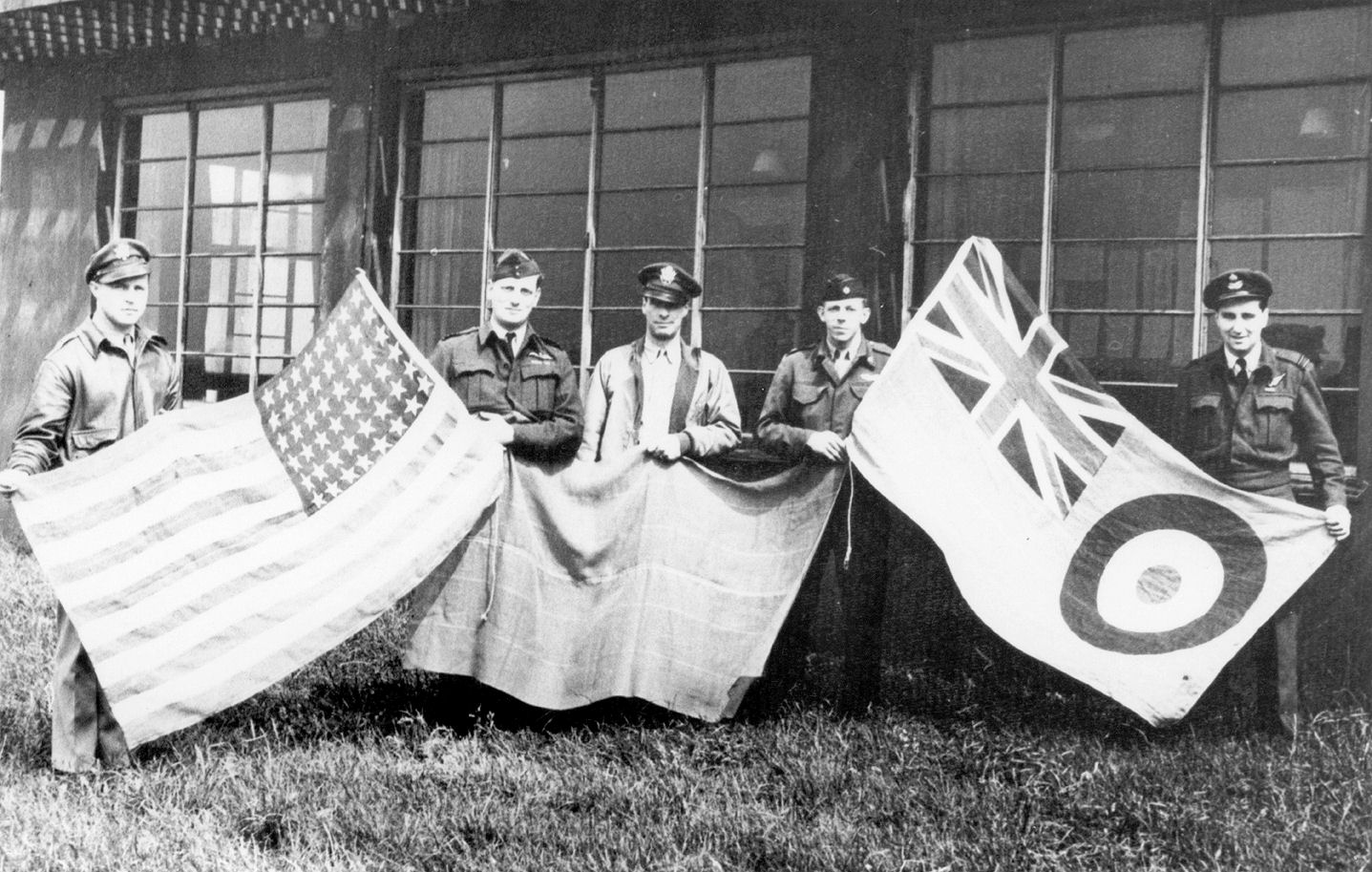
British and American personnel hold up flags at the 496th Fighter Training Group base in Goxhill., 1944

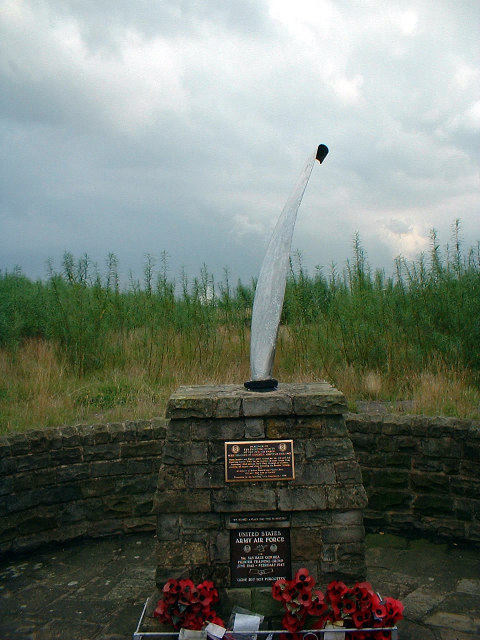
Memorial

Goxhill was originally used as a barrage balloon site to protect the port of Hull and the Humber estuary.

In 1940, Goxhill was transferred to RAF Bomber Command and was planned and rebuilt as a bomber airfield. It was equipped with three intersecting runways, the main runway at 1,600 yards (1,500 m) and two secondary runways of 1,100 yards (1,000 m). Three hangars were built: two T-2s, one J-Type and four blisters and fifty aircraft hardstands. Temporary accommodation was provided for 1700+ personnel.

Its location, however, was too close to the air defences of Hull to be used for that purpose. Its first occupant was No. 1 Group, which took up residence on 26 June 1941. Its mission was towing practice targets with Westland Lysanders; its first operation began on 25 October.

In December 1941, RAF Fighter Command replaced the Bomber Command training unit with No. 12 Group, flying Supermarine Spitfires from No. 616 Squadron at RAF Kirton in Lindsey. Fighter Command operated the base until May 1942.

== United States Army Air Forces use ==
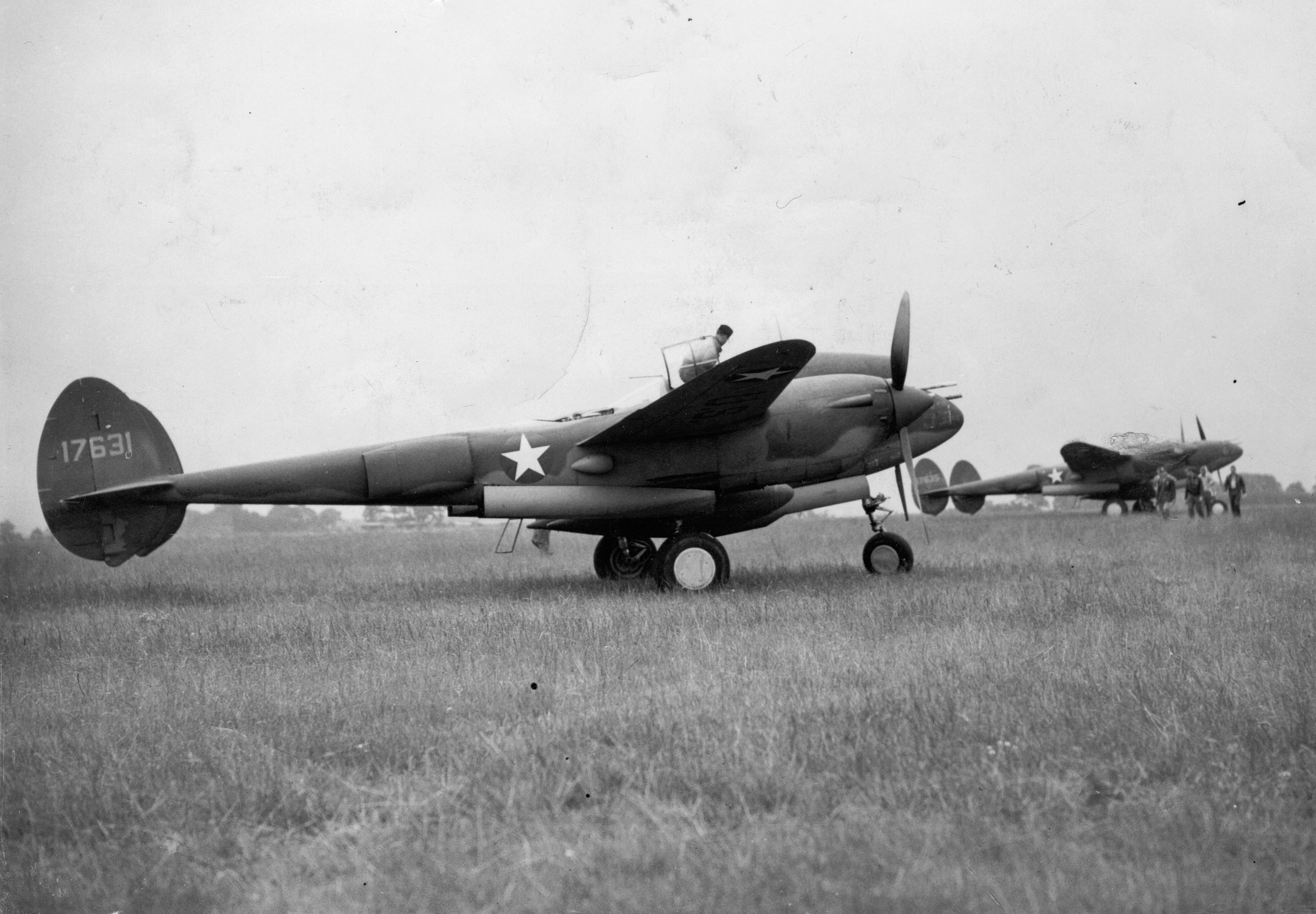
20 July 1942 of P-38 Lightnings, including (serial number 41-7631) of the 1st Fighter Group at Goxhill.

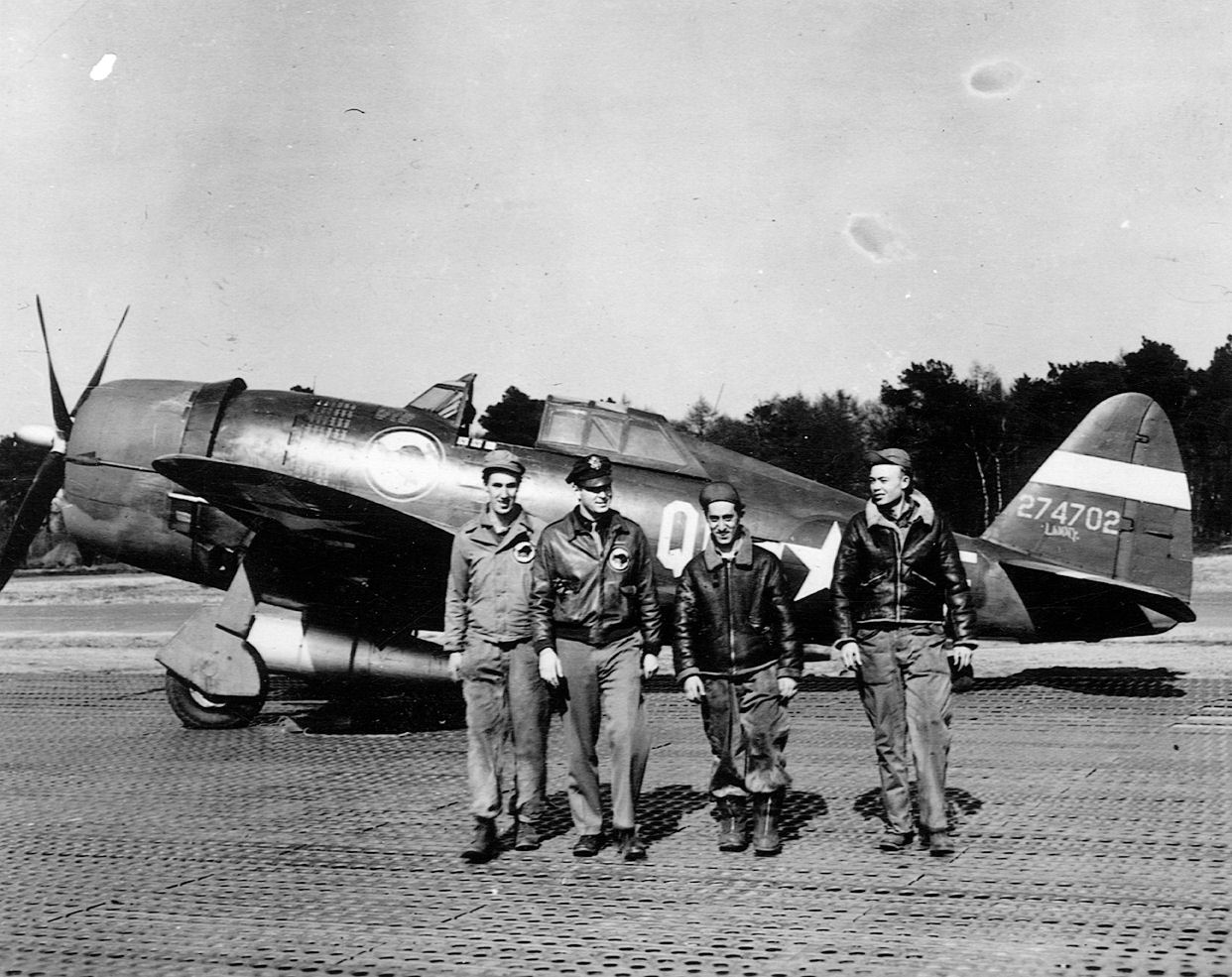
Sergeant Elwin D. Phillips, Lieutenant Sidney Hewitt, Staff Sergeant Michael Yahawk and a colleague, of the 361st Fighter Squadron, 356th Fighter Group stand with Hewitt's P-47 Thunderbolt (QI-F, serial number 42-74702) nicknamed "Clarkie" at Goxhill, 1943.

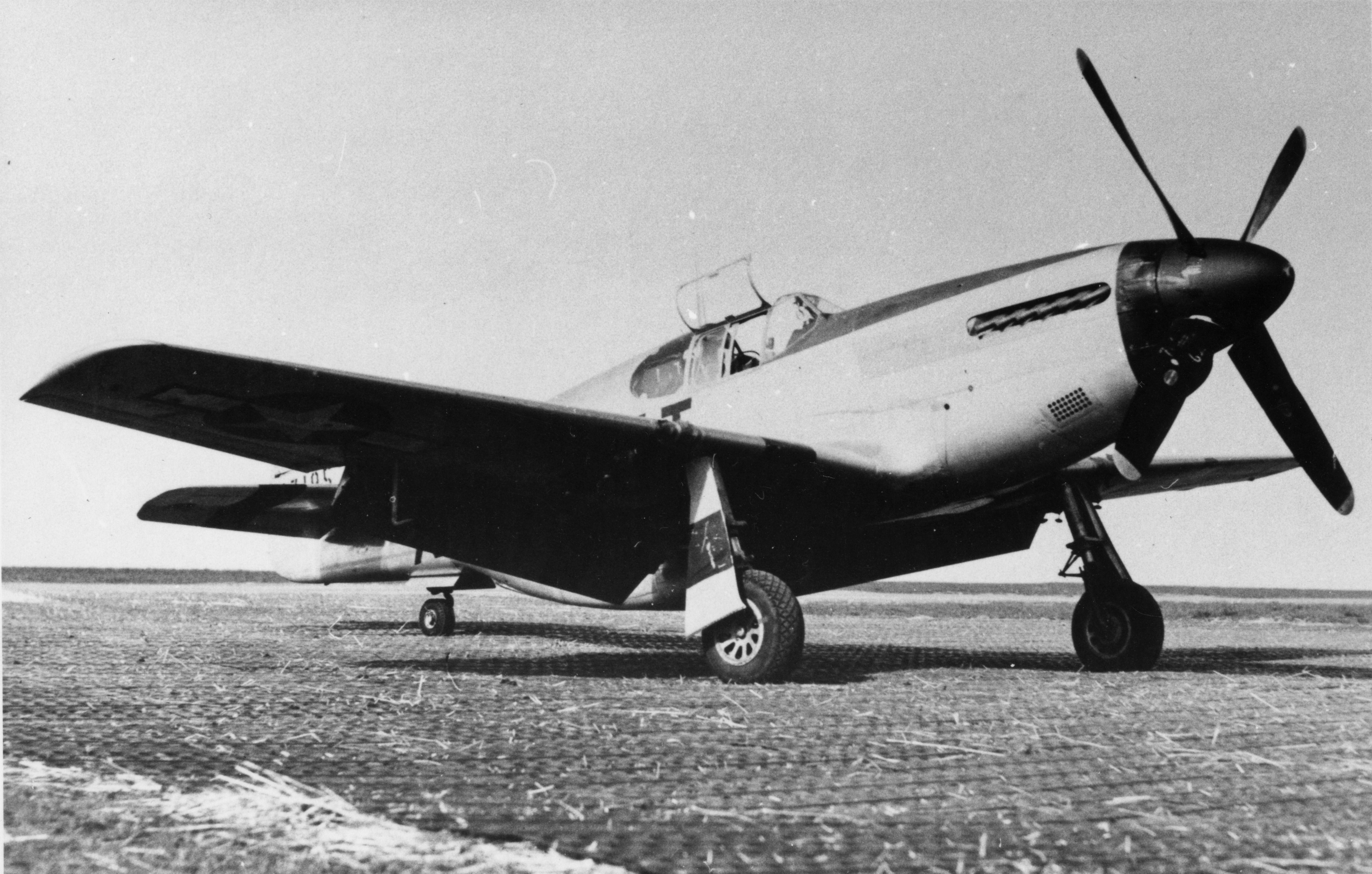
A P-51B Mustang of the 354th Fighter Group at Goxhill, 1944.

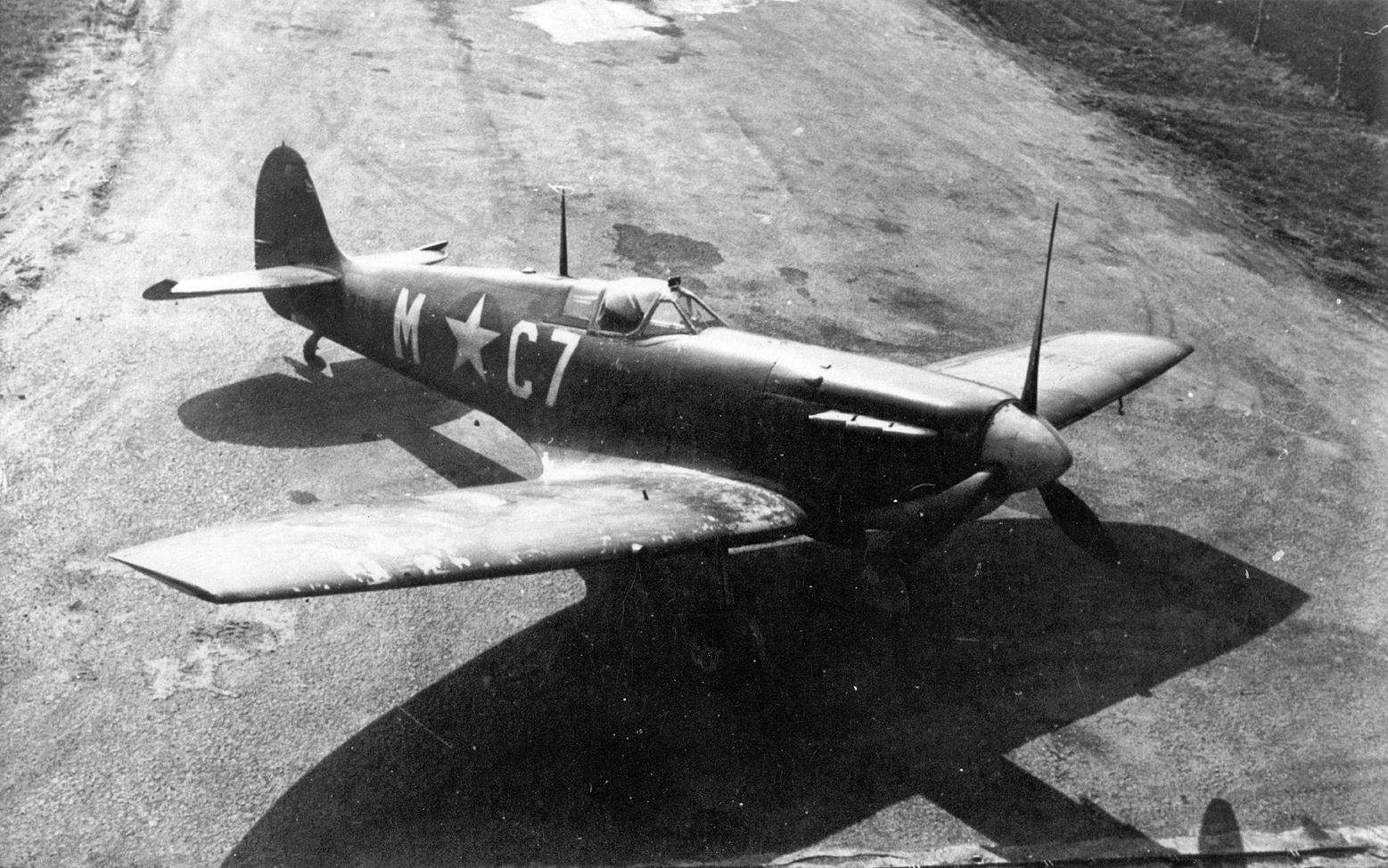
A Spitfire Mk. Va (C7-M, serial number W3815) of the 555th Fighter Training Squadron, 496th Fighter Training Group at Goxhill, 1944.

The airfield was relegated to satellite field use by RAF Kirmington until August 1942, when it was taken over by the United States Army Air Forces (USAAF). The transfer ceremony was attended by General Dwight D. Eisenhower. During the war it was known as USAAF Station 345.

The facilities at Goxhill, however, left a lot to be desired. Three wooden barracks were supplemented by a number of metal fabricated buildings for living quarters. Typical of the temporary RAF station of that period, living quarters and mess facilities were 1 to 2 miles from the hangars and flight operations area for safety reasons.

The station was unofficially known by the USAAF units based here as "GoatHill". The USAAF used Goxhill as a training airfield for the rest of the war; several squadrons used it after their initial deployment to the UK, then moved on to a permanent facility for their operational missions.

USAAF Station Units assigned to RAF Goxhill were:

- 333rd Service Group

332nd Service Squadron; HHS 333d Service Group

- 13th Station Complement Squadron
- 18th Weather Squadron
- 2nd Gunnery & Tow Target Flight
- 1004th Signal Company
- 1148th Quartermaster Company
- 1275th Military Police Company
- 1771st Ordnance Supply & Maintenance Company
- 2130th Engineer Fire Fighting Platoon

Both the USAAF 8th and 9th Air Force used Goxhill. Units which trained here were:

Group	Aircraft	Date Arrived	Date Departed
1st Fighter Group	Lockheed P-38 Lightning	10 June 1942	24 August 1942
52nd Fighter Group	Bell P-39 Airacobra	26 August 1942	9 November 1942
78th Fighter Group	P-38 Lightning; P-47 Thunderbolt	1 December 1942	6 April 1943
353rd Fighter Group	Republic P-47 Thunderbolt	7 June 1943	3 August 1943
356th Fighter Group	P-47 Thunderbolt	27 August 1943	5 October 1943
358th Fighter Group	P-47 Thunderbolt	20 October 1943	29 November 1943
496th Fighter Training Group	North American P-51 Mustang; P-38 Lightning	25 December 1943	15 February 1945

The 496th Fighter Group was a Combat Crew Replacement Center for 8th and 9th USAAF units. It consisted of the 554th Fighter Squadron with P-38s and the 555th Fighter Squadron with North American P-51 Mustangs. The group trained over 2,400 fighter pilots during its existence. The 78th Fighter Group came to England equipped with P-38s, but had all of its aircraft and most of its pilots sent to the Twelfth Air Force in February 1943, after which it flew P-47 Thunderbolts.

== Post-war military use ==
On 20 January 1945, the USAAF returned Goxhill to RAF control, and it was assigned as a satellite to RAF Kirton In Lindsey. On 27 May 1945 it was assigned to RAF Maintenance Command for storage of excess munitions. RAF Goxhill remained a storage depot until it was deactivated on 14 December 1953.

Goxhill airfield was leased to farmers for agricultural use until 29 January 1962, when it was finally sold by the Ministry of Defence (MoD). The technical site and the hangars, however, were retained by the MoD for storage. In July 1977, the MoD sold off the remaining parts of Goxhill to private owners for agricultural use.

== Agricultural use ==
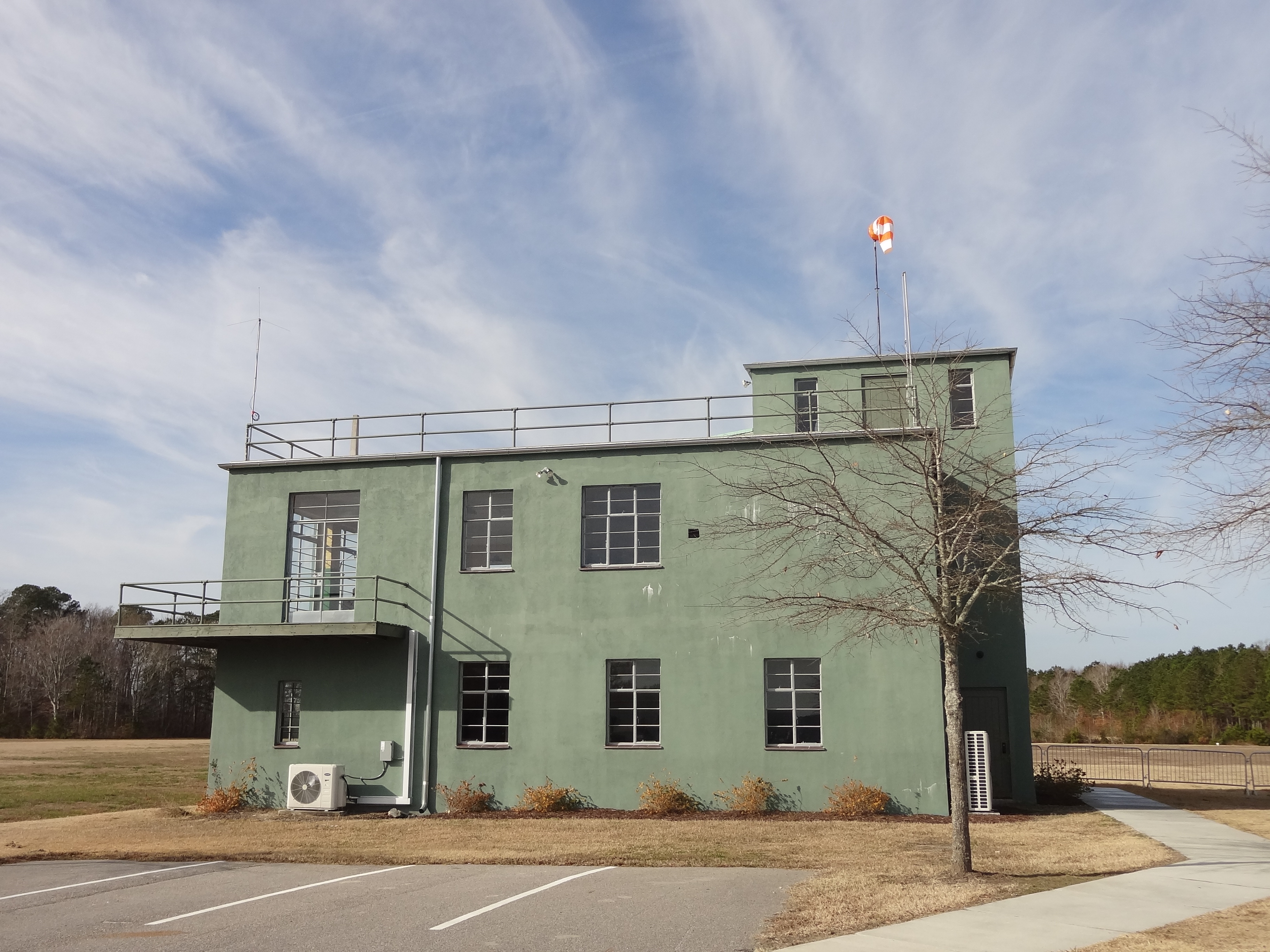
The tower at the Military Aviation Museum in Virginia.

Since the end of its military use, Goxhill airfield has remained remarkably intact, with a Mary Celeste feel about it. Perhaps because of its relative inaccessibility, Goxhill still looks very much as it did during the war years. All the buildings on the technical site, except the control tower which was partly demolished (despite the owner's objection) in 2002, are still standing. The three hangars—two T.2s and a J type—are also there, albeit in a state of disrepair. The perimeter track is almost complete, and a large part of the main runway is still in place. In the northwest corner of the site is a memorial incorporating a propeller blade from a crashed P-38. The remains of the control tower were acquired by the Military Aviation Museum in Pungo, Virginia, USA, and after careful dis-assembly and cataloging, the components were shipped to America, where the tower has been reconstructed for use by the museum.

== See also ==
- List of former Royal Air Force stations
