= La Junta Municipal Airport =

La Junta Municipal Airport (former La Junta Army Air Field)
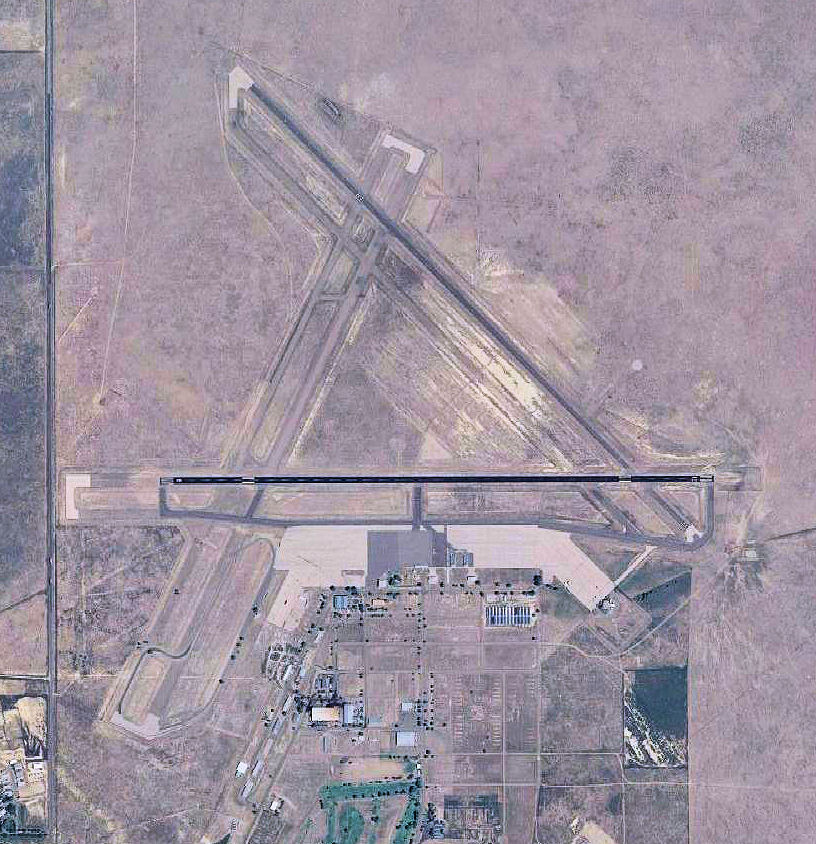
- USGS 2006 orthophoto
- IATA: none; ICAO: KLHX; FAA LID: LHX

Summary
- Airport type: Public
- Owner: City of La Junta
- Serves: La Junta, Colorado
- Location: Otero County, Colorado
- Elevation AMSL: 4,229 ft (1,289 m)
- Coordinates: 38°03′00″N 103°30′35″W
- Website: Official website

Map
- Location within Colorado

Runways
Direction	Length		Surface
Direction	ft	m	Surface
8/26	6,849	2,088	Asphalt
12/30	5,803	1,769	Asphalt/concrete

Helipads
Number	Length		Surface
Number	ft	m	Surface
H1	145	44	Asphalt

Statistics (2010)
- Aircraft operations: 6,900
- Based aircraft: 15
- Source: Federal Aviation Administration

La Junta Municipal Airport (ICAO: KLHX, FAA LID: LHX) is three miles north of La Junta, in Otero County, Colorado, United States. The National Plan of Integrated Airport Systems for 2011–2015 categorized it as a general aviation facility.

Many U.S. airports use the same three-letter location identifier for the FAA and IATA, but this airport is LHX to the FAA and has no IATA code.

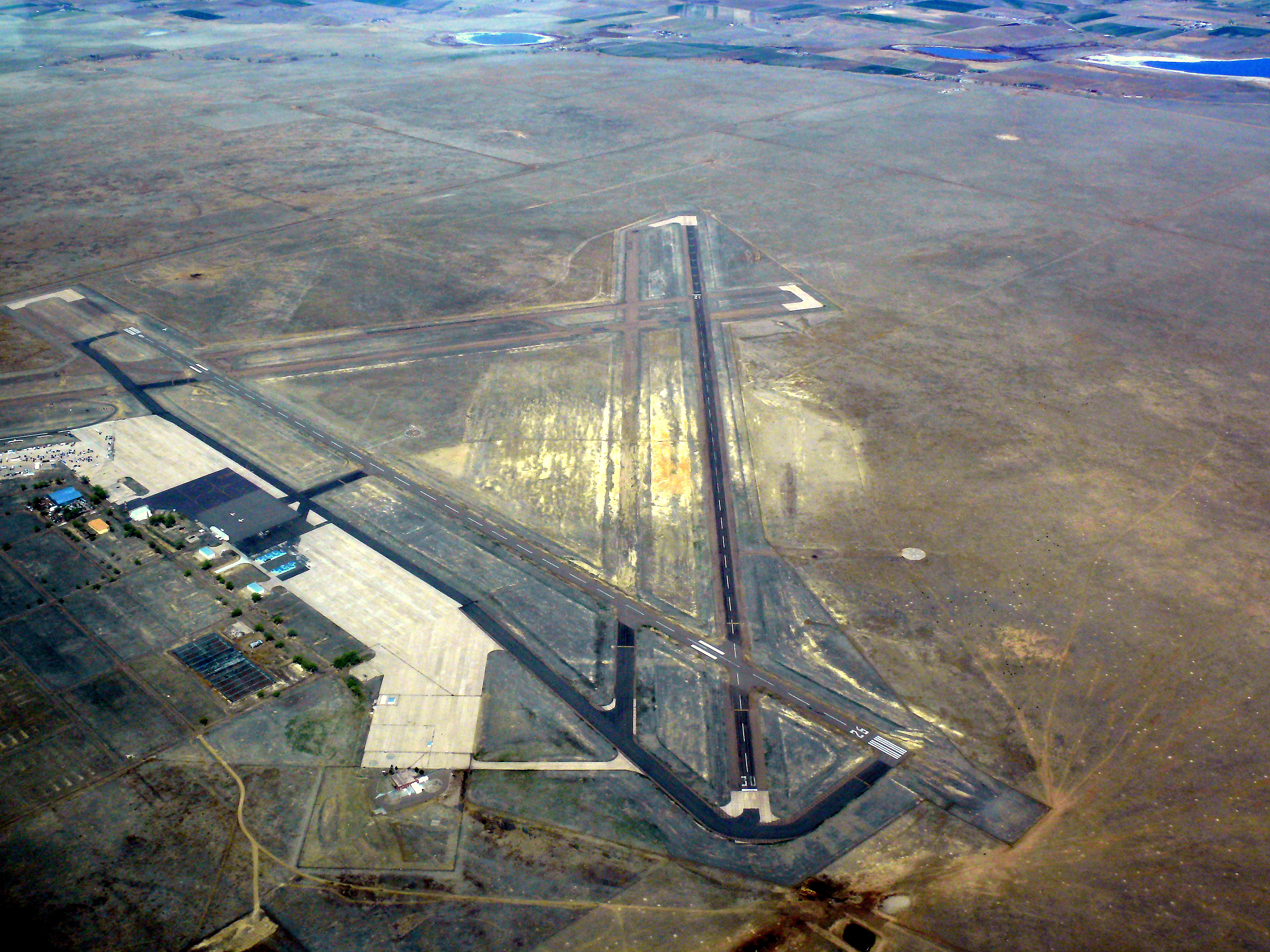
La Junta Municipal Airport in April 2008 from an altitude of 9500ft MSL

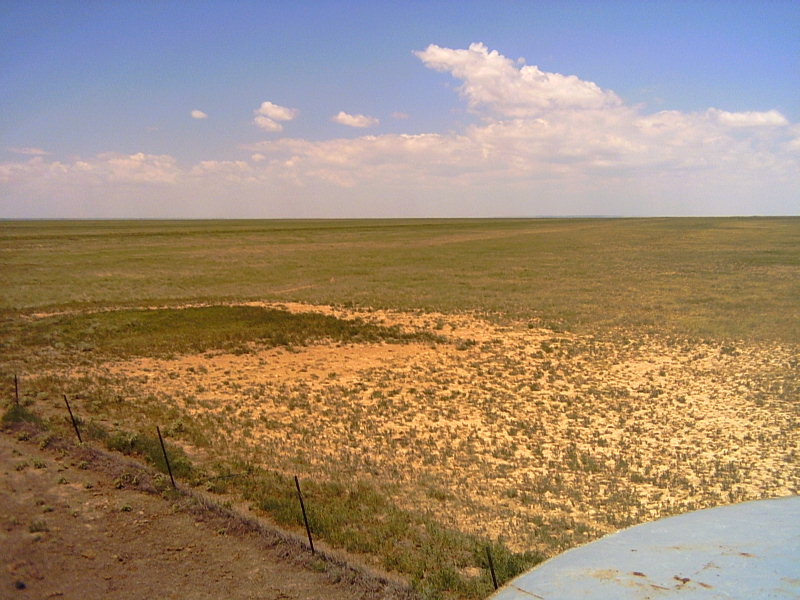
Former La Junta AAF's Arlingtion Auxiliary Airfield#4: view from the SW corner of the triangular runway looking WNW, 2006

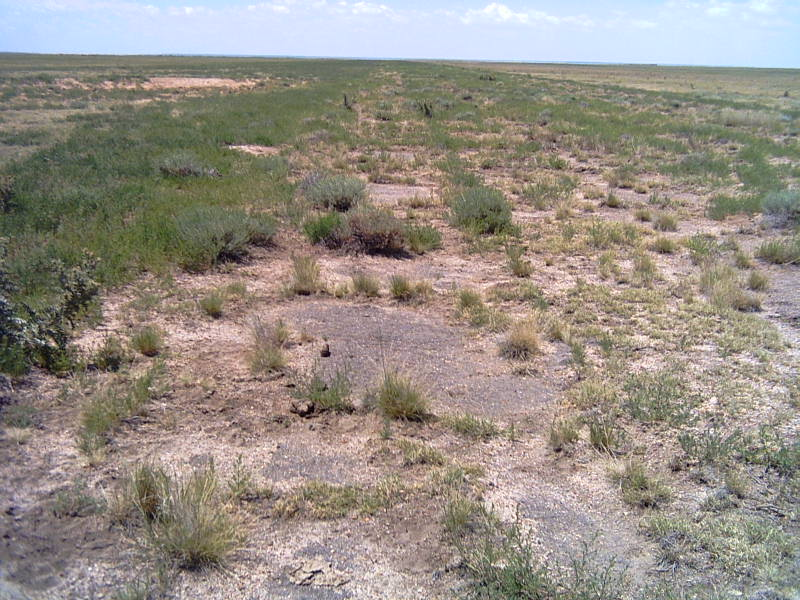
Arlington Auxiliary Airfield#4: E/W runway looking west, 2006. Notice runway asphalt and vegetation changes along runway.

== History ==
The history of the airport began in 1935 with initial development by the Civil Aeronautics Authority. In 1940 the War Department leased the facility for civil pilot training of British RAF and Royal Canadian Air Force pilots in four-engine aircraft.

In 1942 the airport was taken over by the United States Army Air Forces and assigned to the Western Flying Training Command (WFTC) and the airfield was expanded to accommodate a large number of aircraft and training flights. Three asphalt runways were constructed in a triangle layout, 8000x150 (NE/SW), 8000x150 (E/W), 8000x150 (NW/SE) along with a large aircraft parking apron, taxiways, landing aids and several large aircraft hangars. In addition, four auxiliary airfields were constructed to accommodate training flights and emergency landings:

- Rocky Ford Aux #1 38°08′05″N 103°41′16″W
- Las Animas Aux #2 38°08′51″N 103°16′03″W
- La Junta Aux #3 37°58′55″N 103°34′03″W
- Arlington Aux #4 38°20′06″N 103°16′36″W

La Junta Army Airfield was activated on November 2, 1942 and was designated as an advanced twin-engine flying school under the jurisdiction of the 83d Flying Training Wing (Advanced, Twin-Engine), Douglas Army Airfield, Arizona. It operated B-25 Mitchell twin-engine bombers and Cessna AT-17, Curtiss AT-9 twin-engine, and BT-15 Valiant and BT-13 Valiant single-engined trainers.

In March 1944 the Advanced Twin Engine School was re-designated as the 402d Army Air Force Base Unit. In March 1945, the unit was re-designated as the 249th Army Air Forces Base Unit (Army Air Forces Pilot School, Specialized Four Engine) and jurisdiction was transferred to Second Air Force in June. The mission of La Junta AAF then became the training of replacement heavy bomber pilots in AT-17 Flying Fortress trainers for eventual assignment to B-17 Flying Fortress bombers.

The 50th and 358th Fighter groups were assigned to La Junta in late 1945 (August - November) for inactivation.

La Junta AAF received notice from Second Air Force that it would be inactivated on 28 February 1946, and it was returned to the local government for civil use.

=== Historical airline service ===
La Junta received service by Continental Airlines with Douglas DC-3 aircraft from 1944 through 1957. The airport was one of several stops on a route between Denver and Tulsa which included stops at Colorado Springs, Pueblo, and Wichita.

More airport, city, and county history can be obtained from the Otero Museum and the Otero County Historical Society.

The airport was used as a filming location for the 1973 film by Terrence Malick titled Badlands.

== Facilities ==
The airport covers 4,200 acres (1,700 ha) at an elevation of 4,229 feet (1,289 m). It has two runways: 8/26 is 6,849 by 75 feet (2,088 x 23 m) and 12/30 is 5,803 by 60 feet (1,769 x 18 m). It has one helipad, H1, 145 by 145 feet (44 x 44 m).

In 2024, the airport had over 17,000 aircraft operations, average 18 per day: 98% general aviation, 1% air ambulance, and 1% military. Over 15 single-engine aircraft are based at the airport, including local aerial applicators, air ambulance, and flight trainers.

== See also ==
- List of airports in Colorado
