= Forest Hill =

Forest Hill or Forrest Hill may refer to:

== Places ==
=== Australia ===
- Forest Hill, New South Wales, a suburb of Wagga Wagga
- Forrest Hill, New South Wales, a suburb of Albury
- Forest Hill, Queensland
- Forest Hill, Victoria
  - Forest Hill Chase Shopping Centre
- Electoral district of Forest Hill, an electoral district in Victoria
- Forest Hill, Western Australia, a locality of the Shire of Plantagenet

=== Canada ===
- Forest Hill, Toronto, Ontario, Canada
- Forest Hill (electoral district), Ontario
- Forest Hill, Guysborough, Nova Scotia
- Forest Hill, Kings, Nova Scotia
- Forest Hills, Nova Scotia

=== United Kingdom ===
- Forest Hill, London, a suburb
  - Forest Hill railway station
  - Forest Hill School
  - Forest Hill (ward)
- Forest Hill, Oxfordshire
- Forest Hill, Wiltshire

=== United States ===
- Foresthill, California
- Forest Hill, San Francisco, California, a neighborhood
  - Forest Hill Station (San Francisco), a Muni Metro station
- Forest Hill, Indiana
- Forest Hill, Kansas
- Forest Hill (Danville, Kentucky), listed on the National Register of Historic Places listings in Boyle County, Kentucky
- Forest Hill, Louisiana
- Forest Hill, Maryland
- Forest Hill, Newark, New Jersey
- Forest Hill, Ohio, a neighborhood in Cleveland Heights and East Cleveland
- Forest Hill, Oklahoma
- Forest Hill, Texas
- Forest Hill (Amherst, Virginia), a historic home in Amherst County, Virginia
- Forest Hill, Richmond, Virginia, a neighborhood
- Forest Hill, West Virginia
- Forest Hill Cemetery (disambiguation)

=== Elsewhere ===
- Forrest Hill, New Zealand, a suburb of Auckland
- Forest Hill, Gauteng, South Africa

== People ==
- Forrest Hill (artist), a mural-painter of a Montana post office

== See also ==
- Forest Hills (disambiguation)
- Forest Hill Cemetery (disambiguation)
- Forest Hill Historic District (disambiguation)
- Forest Hill Park (disambiguation)
- Forest Hill station (disambiguation)
