= Forest Hills =

Forest Hills or Forrest Hills may refer to:

== Places ==
=== United States ===
- Forest Hills (Tampa), Florida
- Forest Hills, Illinois, a neighborhood in Western Springs
- Forest Hills, Kentucky
- Forest Hills, Boston, Massachusetts
  - Forest Hills Cemetery
- Forest Hills, Michigan
- Forest Hills, Queens, in New York City
- Forest Hills, North Carolina
- Forest Hills, Pennsylvania
- Forest Hills, Tennessee
- Forrest Hills, Tennessee
- Forest Hills, Dallas, Texas
- Forest Hills, Virginia
- Forest Hills, Kanawha County, West Virginia
- Forest Hills (Washington, D.C.)

=== Elsewhere ===
- Forest Hills, Nova Scotia, Canada
- Forest Hills, Kloof, South Africa

== Schools ==
- Forest Hills High School (disambiguation)
- Forest Hills Public Schools, Kent County, Michigan
- Forest Hills Local School District, a public school district in Hamilton County, Ohio
- Forest Hills School District, a public school district in Cambria County, Pennsylvania

== See also ==
- Forest Hills Foods, a local supermarket in Grand Rapids, Michigan owned by SpartanNash
- Forest Hills Historic District (disambiguation)
- Forest Hills station (disambiguation)
- Forest Hill (disambiguation)
