= Placer High School =

Public secondary school in Auburn, California, USA

Location
- 275 Orange Street; Auburn, California 95603; United States; 38.89522°N 121.07208°W

Information
- Type: Public secondary
- Established: 1897
- School district: Placer Union High School District
- Teaching staff: 59.70 (FTE)
- Grades: 9th – 12th
- Enrollment: 1,303 (2023–2024)
- Student to teacher ratio: 21.83
- Colors: Green and gold
- Fight song: Placer Fight Song
- Mascot: Hillman/Hillgal
- Rival: Lincoln High School (Lincoln, California) Del Oro High School
- Website: Official site
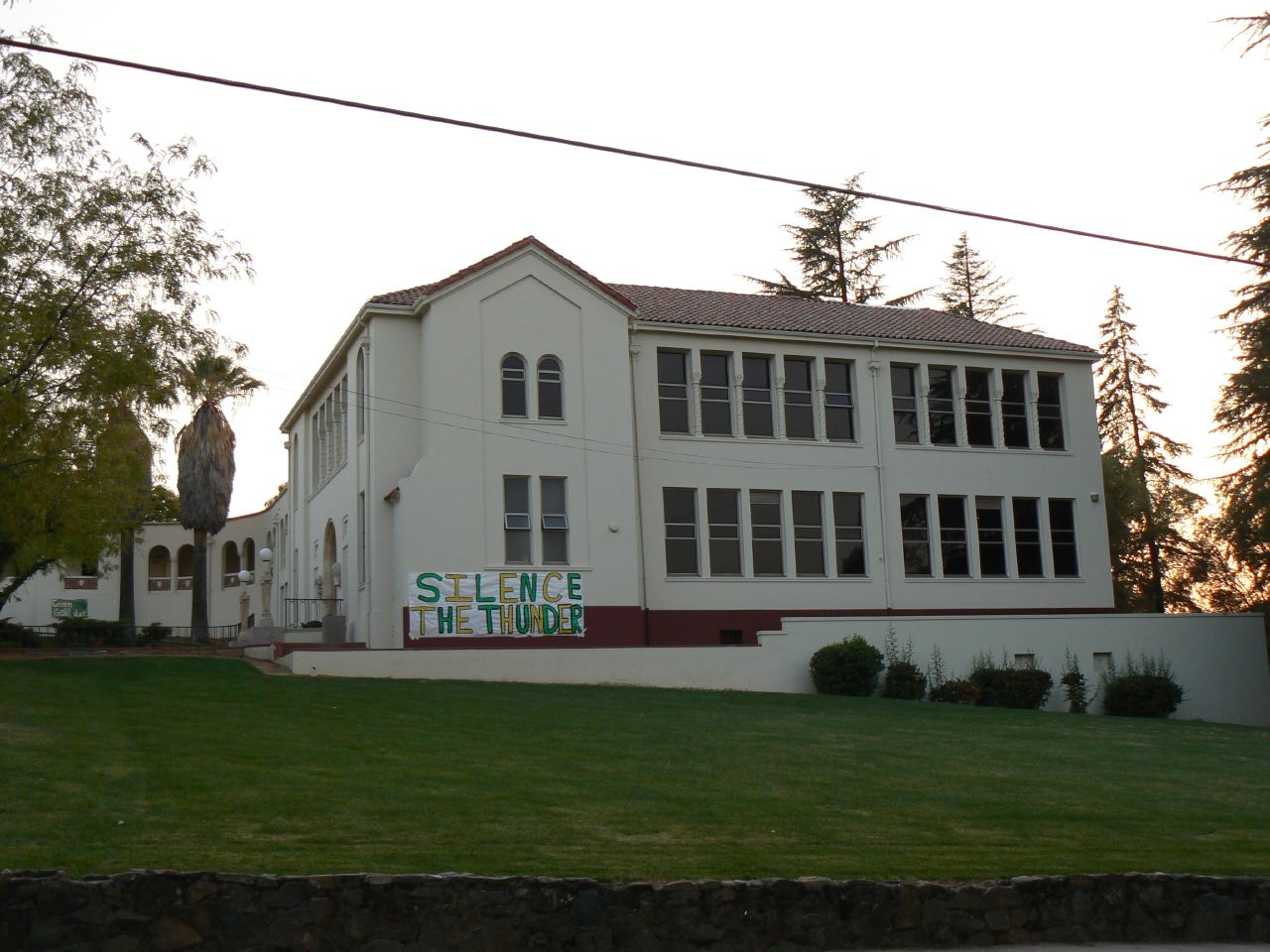

Placer High School is a public high school located in Auburn, California, United States, and is part of the Placer Union High School District. Auburn is located 33 miles (53 km) northeast of Sacramento, California, in the foothills of the Sierra Nevada Mountains.

== History ==
=== History, 1882 to 1906 ===
Placer High School’s origins can be traced back to 1882 when three young men from the East Coast arrived in Auburn with a dream of creating a college for Northern California. The trio met with influential members of the community in the Placer County Courthouse and began a campaign to solicit donations to the building fund of the Sierra Normal College and Business Institute. When the contributions reached $6,000, the three young teachers, M.L. Fries, A.W. Sutphen, and M.W. Ward contributed $1500 each and began to search for a building site.

General Jo Hamilton, a former Attorney General for the State of California during the 1870s, had retired to Auburn by this time and built a home on an estate at the corner of what is now High Street and College Way. He donated a 5-acre (20,000 m^{2}) parcel of his land to the newly formed school. By 1883 Sierra Normal College was advertised in the Placer Argus newspaper as “the only independent normal college on the Pacific Coast.” Normal in this instance meant preliminary, professional education of teachers.

1897 marks the beginning of Placer High School. In that year a Professor DeBell and the City of Auburn leased the Sierra Normal College building and property and ran the school under the name of Auburn High School. In September of that year the school began operations with 17 students present, all of whom paid tuition. Auburn High School graduated its first class in June 1900 at the opera house, the result of a three-year study. There were 10 students, six boys and four girls—five of them attended the University of California. At the time half of the students came from towns other than Auburn. In the first four years student population grew and more pupils were coming from outside of Auburn. This growth required more teachers and money and in 1901 the electors of Placer County voted for a high school and the name was changed to Placer County High School. Two years later, in 1903, the county purchased the building and grounds from Dr. Ward, the president and sole owner of the former Sierra Normal College.

=== History, 1906 to 1936 ===
Dr. John F. Engle became principal of Placer High School in 1906 and began a 30-year career in which the school expanded from five teachers in one rickety wooden building to an 800-student facility boasting five buildings and the creation of a junior college.

Several landmark buildings were added during Engle’s stay as principal. During the 1906–07 school years the original Sierra College wooden building was torn down and replaced by a $40,000 building. The new building was a brick structure consisting of 22 rooms on four levels, including a basement, and a large tin dome.

In 1909 shower baths and lockers for athletes were installed downstairs in the new building. In the next few years tennis courts were finished on the site of the old wooden building and a football field and track were installed. By 1918 the school showcased a large wooden gymnasium with sideline seating and a stage. 1926 marked the beginning of a new era for Placer when the music/auditorium and science wings were added and the brick building was plastered over to match the architectural style of the two new wings. The auto shop and bus shed building along Agard Street were constructed at this time. Ten years later, building began on Placer Junior College buildings, gym and athletic field during the final year of Engle's administration, 1936.

Athletics began to affect the school during Engle’s tenure. The addition of a young coach from the University of California, Earl Crabbe, enabled the girls’ and boys’ basketball teams to achieve great success. Between 1916 and 1920 the girls' basketball team went 41–1, winning 37 games in succession at one point, compiling four straight undefeated seasons. Beginning in 1923 the boys’ basketball teams won 16 out of 17 league championships, including 12 in a row. Crabbe also coached his men to eight Central California titles in 13 appearances.

Engle was at the helm through World War I, when a junior Red Cross Club was organized on campus with girls learning to make surgical dressings and the school donating over $500 to a war drive. The Engle years also saw the formation of the first high school cadet corps in the State of California under the direction of Captain Fred S. Roumage, a National Guard officer and later captain in France in World War I.

1914 marked the birth of the Placer High School district, thus again changing the names of the school to Placer High School. That same year college level classes were revived, having disappeared several years earlier. However, due to the enrollment drain caused by World War I, the junior college was abandoned by 1920.

Ceremonies included Freshman Reception, the Christmas Jinx, the Junior Prom, the Senior Ball, Senior Picnic, and the Graduation and Alumni Dance. Participation in clubs and organization also grew, beginning with the Agricultural Science Organization which became the Future Farmers of America, the oldest club in existence. During the period of time the Placer Band came into prominence under the guidance of Otto Fox, entertaining the school and the community at concerts and public performances.

Academics also took on prominence during the Engle principalship. A four-year curriculum became the norm with students tracked into Classical, Scientific, or Commercial fields of study.

=== History, 1936 to 1960 ===
During its next phase three wings of buildings and a new $85,000 gymnasium were constructed to serve primarily Placer Junior College, but Placer High School students shared many of the facilities and organizations with the new college.

Steve Barooshian, a slightly built, Armenian refugee with a Stanford education, came to the foothills to teach the feared “mountain boys”. Strict and unyielding, Barooshian introduced his young students to world history and classical music. He also taught at placer junior college and also became one of Auburns most well known teachers.

Earl Crabbe continued his career during this time, leaving coaching but creating journalism program at both the high school and college. The two school published the Placer Union newspaper with college students producing the paper first semester and the high school continuing production during second semester.

Howard Woodside joined the high school staff during this period of time, coaching baseball and football before moving on to an illustrations career at Placer Junior College. Frank Bonito became the FFA advisor and rifle team coach, capturing four California state championships and one US title between 1951 and 1955.

Ralph LeFebvre became a staff member in 1944. A graduate of Placer in 1923, he worked for several years as a custodian at the school in college, obtaining his teaching credential at night from Sacramento State college. His teaching career began in 1944 and continued until his retirement in 1970. During that span he created scores of championship teams in basketball and track. His cross country teams won 74 out of 102 meets and his track teams won 123 out of 150 meets.

In 1941 a young coach, Kendall Arnett, became the football, basketball, and baseball coach. He began the Block "P" society and initiated the annual Block "P" Patriotic Basketball Tournament in 1943. He died suddenly in 1954 and the school renamed it the Kendall Arnett Memorial Tournament. It has since become the oldest basketball tournament in Northern California.

The school continued its academic reputation with Placer Graduates attending UC Berkeley placing first in the scholastic ratings at the university, beating out 149 other schools in the five-year period from 1935 to 1940. The Music Department continued to improve with the high school band combining with the junior college band until 1940. The girl-ask-boy dance tradition began with the creation of the annual Sadie Hawkins Dance based on the characters from the Lil’ Abner comic strip. And the first female student body president, Barbara Billing was elected in the 1948–49 school year.

=== History, 1960 to current ===
By 1960, Placer High School had grown in terms of physical space but reduced in population. The junior college had vacated its campus, moving to Rocklin, California as Sierra College, and two new high schools, Del Oro High School and Colfax High School had become part of the high school district. Placer High, which began as a one-building facility in 1897, had an upper and lower campus comprised by 11 white stucco and red tiled buildings. More buildings would appear in the next three decades. By the end of the sixties the school boasted an on-site stadium for football and track, a new library, and new history and English wings which replaced the 1906 brick building. The 1926 science and auditorium wings had been renovated by the seventies and a new practice gymnasium was built behind the venerable Earl Crabbe Gym in 1982.

The band competes in competitions and often is one of the top schools. The program has produced many talented musicians, many being some of the top in the state. Placer excelled in sports during this period of time as Tom Barry took over the helm adding to the heritage of the Crabbe and LeFebvre coached teams, and creating his own glory. His teams won eight league titles in 12 years, including six in a row, at one point in the seventies, and he retired in 1979 averaging twenty wins per season. Bill Flake began a wrestling program at Placer in 1965. Before retiring, he coached his grapplers to seventeen league championships and guided two wrestlers, Steve Stratton and Gary Anderson, to state titles.

Tom Johnson and Bill Miller teamed up as co-coaches to guide the Hillmen football program to its most successful era. From 1973 to 1982 they compiled a 93–18–1 record and five Sac-Joaquin Section titles. Three times they achieved undefeated seasons and twice they were ranked Number one in the state. Miller went on to coach the girls' tennis and build a state powerhouse team that won 12 straight league championships and nine Sac-Joaquin Section titles. Radley McCord coached the boys’ tennis team to similar dominance. In the nineties, the Senior Project became a requirement for the students and the program paid off as student projects led to the Hall of Fame, an all-weather track, a Centennial Arch and brick walkway, and an art gallery among other projects.

The concept of Quality Schools became a reality with students given more responsibility to make decisions concerning their lives and education. As Placer High School approached the end of its first century, the school applied for and received Charter School status, enabling the school to be run on independent state of education codes.

== Athletics ==
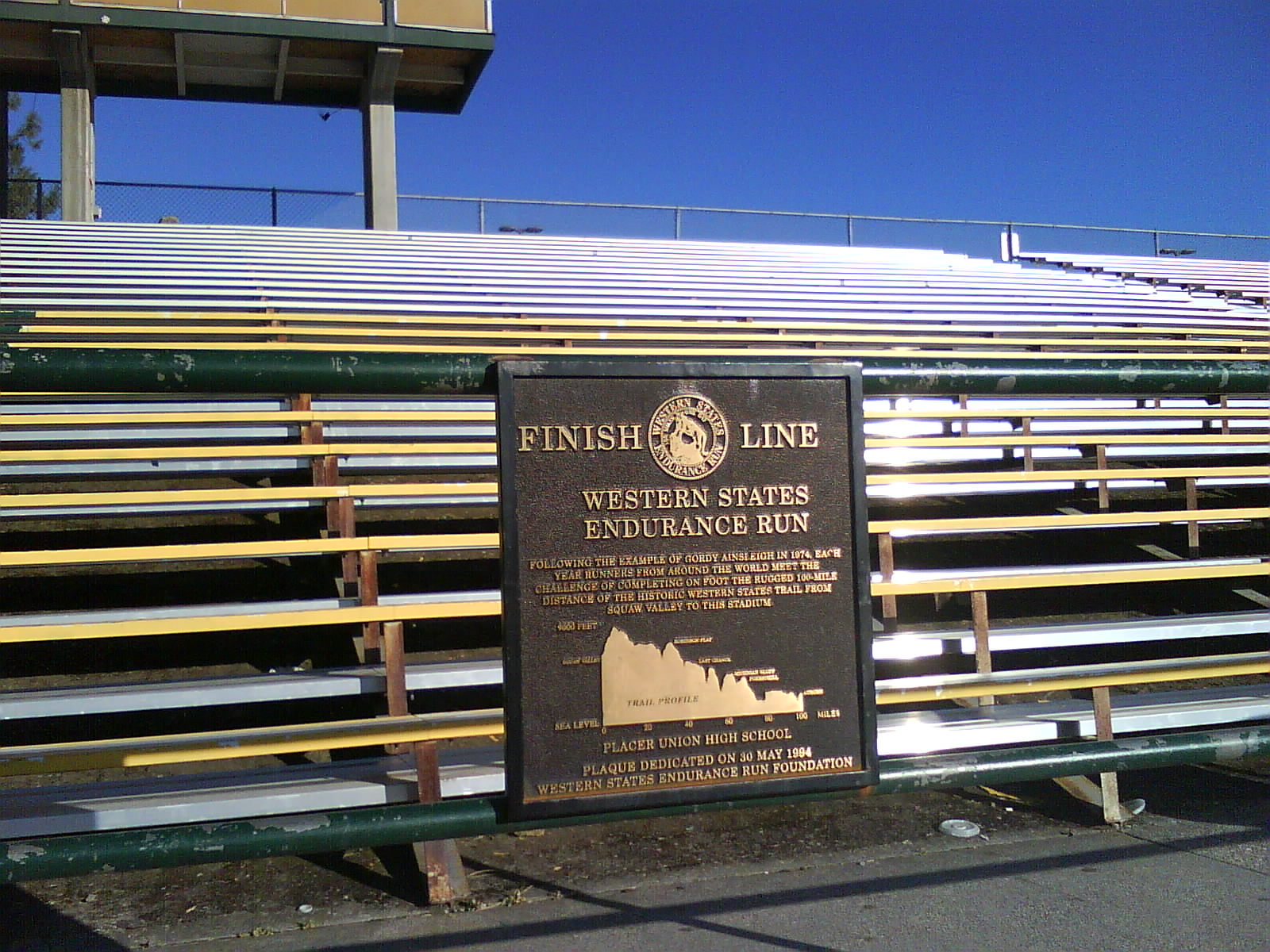
The finish line to the Western States 100 at Placer High School

- Men's fall: football, cross country
- Women's fall: golf, volleyball, cross country
- Men's winter: basketball, alpine skiing, snowboarding, wrestling, soccer, Nordic skiing
- Women's winter: basketball, alpine skiing, snowboarding, Nordic skiing, soccer
- Men's spring: track and field, baseball, swimming, golf, tennis, volleyball
- Women's spring: track and field, softball, swimming, tennis

Placer High School is known for some of its tournaments and athletic events, such as the Le Febvre Relays (Track) and the Kendall Arnett (basketball). The track also serves as the finish line of Western States Endurance Run.

== School statistics ==
- Total students: 1,599
- Full-time teachers: 71
- Student/teacher ratio: 23 students/1 teacher
- Asian: 3%, African American: 1%, Hispanic: 10%, Native American: 1%, White: 78%, Other: 7%

== Notable alumni ==
- Clarence E. "Bud" Anderson, retired officer in Air Force and "triple ace" in World War II, class of 1939
- Jeff Blauser, retired Major League baseball player, infielder for 1995 World Series champion Atlanta Braves, All-Star team
- Ben Nighthorse Campbell, former US Senator, Native American leader, and captain of judo team at 1964 Summer Olympics
- Thomas Martin, race car driver
- Stacy Dragila, Olympic gold medalist in pole vault at 2000 Summer Olympics, three-time world champion, member of National Track and Field Hall of Fame
- Lisa Mispley Fortier, head coach for the Gonzaga Bulldogs women's basketball team, wife of Craig Fortier, also a Placer High alumni
- Brad Johnson, played Deputy Lofty Craig on Gail Davis's television series Annie Oakley; later real estate developer in Los Angeles
- Dean S. Laird, retired USN Commander; only WWII Navy ace with victories in both the Pacific and European Theaters, class of 1939
- Lee Murchison, former NFL player
- Jason Rhoades, installation artist
- Clark Ashton Smith, fiction writer, poet, and artist; briefly attended the school
- Eddie Vanderdoes, football player for NFL's Oakland Raiders
- Buffy Wicks, political strategist, labor, women's, and children's rights advocate
- Ian Riley, radio personality, award-winning podcaster
- Isaiah Piñeiro, Olympian for Puerto Rico's Men's Basketball Team
