= Forest Hill Cemetery =

Forest Hill Cemetery or variation may also refer to:

== United States ==
- Forest Hill Calvary Cemetery, Kansas City, Missouri
- Forest Hill Cemetery (Greencastle, Indiana)
- Forest Hill Cemetery (Ann Arbor, Michigan)
- Forest Hill Cemetery (Utica, New York)
- Forest Hill Cemetery (Memphis, Tennessee)
- Forest Hill Cemetery (Madison, Wisconsin)
- Forest Hills Cemetery, Jamaica Plain, Boston, Massachusetts

== See also ==
- Forest Hills (disambiguation)
- Forest Hill (disambiguation)
