= Forest Hills School =

Forest Hills School may refer to:

- Forest Hills School (New Brunswick), a school in New Brunswick School District 08, Canada
- Forest Hills School (Franklin, Tennessee), listed on the U.S. National Register of Historic Places

== See also ==
- Forest Hills High School (disambiguation)
- Forest Hills School District
