= Forest Hill Historic District =

Forest Hill Historic District may refer to:

- Forest Hill Historic District (Newark, New Jersey), listed on the National Register of Historic Places (NRHP) in Essex County
- Forest Hill Historic District (Cleveland, Ohio), listed on the National Register of Historic Places in Cuyahoga County
- Forest Hill Historic District (Cleveland Heights, Ohio), listed on the National Register of Historic Places in Cuyahoga County
- Forest Hill Historic District (Richmond, Virginia), listed on the NRHP in Richmond

== See also ==
- Forest Hill (disambiguation)
