= Kenna Mitchell =

American racing driver (born 2006)

- Mitchell at Madera Speedway in 2026
- Born: March 6, 2006 (age 20); Loomis, California
- Awards: 2025 Wendell Scott Trailblazer Award

ARCA Menards Series West career
- 4 races run over 1 year
- ARCA West no., team: No. 13 (Central Coast Racing)
- Best finish: 19th (2026)
- First race: 2026 Bill Schmitt Memorial 173 (Shasta)
- Last race: 2026 NAPA Auto Parts 150 (Bakersfield)
Wins	Top tens	Poles
0	2	0
- Statistics up to date as of November 2, 2026.

Kenna Mitchell (born March 6, 2006) is an American professional stock car racing driver. She currently competes full-time in the limited late model division in the CARS Tour West in the No. 7 for her family-owned team and part-time in the ARCA Menards West Series in the No. 13 for Central Coast Racing.

Born and raised in Loomis, California, Mitchell began racing bandoleros and mini cup cars in the nearby city of Roseville's All American Speedway at the age of 11. After winning a track championship at All American in bandoleros in 2019, Mitchell moved to racing late models. Over the following five years, Mitchell won various track championships at All American Speedway, including two consecutive seasons of winning both the pro and super late model track championships. In 2026, Mitchell began making starts in the NASCAR regional touring ARCA Menards West Series to prepare for a full-time campaign in the West Series the following year.

== Early life and family background ==
Kenna Mitchell was born on March 6, 2006, in Loomis, California, to Michael and Katie Mitchell. Her father is the owner and co-founder of Sinister Diesel, an aftermarket automotive parts company for trucks with diesel engines. She was born alongside a younger sister named Tayler. Mitchell was educated at Del Oro High School, graduating in 2024. In her childhood years, she participated in various sports, but later admitted that none of the sports she did "never really clicked". As of 2024, Mitchell stated plans to pursue higher education at a university, but also stated in an interview that "I still have my whole life to do that. I'd rather race right now... and see where this goes."

== Racing career ==
=== Early racing career ===
Mitchell is a third-generation racer, with both her grandfather and her father having prior racing experience. Her grandfather competed in drag racing and her father competed in modified racing. Mitchell began racing at the age of 11, racing bandoleros and mini cup cars at All American Speedway and Madera Speedway. In 2019, Mitchell won the track championship at All American Speedway in the bandolero division. The following year, Mitchell began racing in junior pro late models, earning second in the driver's standings for the junior pro late model division at All America. Mitchell won the junior pro late model division track championship at All American in the following year, winning five races during the season. In 2022, Mitchell moved up into the pro late model division full-time after racing the division part-time the year prior. On July 9, Mitchell won her first career pro late model race at All American Speedway at the age of 16; Mitchell won another feature the following race for a two-win season.

After a one-win season in All American's pro late model division in 2023, for the 2024 season, Mitchell raced in two divisions at All American Speedway: the pro late model and super late model divisions. Mitchell won both track championships in pro late models and super late models, winning three pro late model features and two super late model features. Mitchell continued racing in pro and super late models for the 2025 season. During the season, Mitchell earned two pro late model and one super late model feature wins at All American Speedway. At season's end, Mitchell won her second pro late model and super late model championships at All American; the second consecutive season of doing so. As a result, Mitchell was awarded the California state championship from the NASCAR Local Racing Series. Mitchell was also awarded the Wendell Scott Trailblazer Award by NASCAR at the end of the year, an annual award given out to minority and women drivers for outstanding performance and "other qualities like sportsmanship and community service".

=== Transition to NASCAR (2026–present) ===
Mitchell's No. 13 car at All American Speedway in 2026

For the 2026 season, Mitchell committed racing full-time in the limited late model division in the CARS Tour West and the Local Racing Series limited late model season at All American Speedway. In addition, in March, Mitchell announced plans to race three races in the state of California in the regional-touring ARCA Menards West Series for Central Coast Racing during the year, owned by motorsports driver Todd Souza and the wife of Todd, Kelly Souza. According to a press release, Mitchell planned a part-time schedule to prepare for a full-time West Series season in 2027. Mitchell made her debut in the West Series at the fourth race of the West Series season at Shasta Speedway on May 2, finishing in eighth. In the CARS Tour West's limited late model division, she is currently the points leader in the driver's standings. On March 14, she earned her first feature win in the division at Kevin Harvick's Kern Raceway. In the Local Racing Series at All American Speedway, Mitchell won the first ten feature races of the season.

== Personal life ==
In her spare time, Mitchell pursues creative writing. In a 2022 interview with Madera Speedway promoter Kenny Shepherd, Mitchell stated that she began working on publishing a book set in a "post-apocalypse.”

== Motorsports results ==
=== Stock car career summary ===
Season	Series	Team	Races	Wins	Top 5	Top 10	Points	Position
2026	ARCA Menards Series West	Central Coast Racing	4	0	1	2	136	19th

=== ARCA Menards Series West ===
(key) (Bold – Pole position awarded by qualifying time. Italics – Pole position earned by points standings or practice time. * – Most laps led. ** – All laps led.)

ARCA Menards Series West results
Year	Team	No.	Make	1	2	3	4	5	6	7	8	9	10	11	12	13	AMSWC	Pts	Ref
2026	Central Coast Racing	13	Toyota	KER	PHO	TUC	SHA; 8	CNS	TRI	SON	PIR					KER; 14	19th	136	
2026	Central Coast Racing	13	Ford									AAS; 15	MAD; 3	LVS	PHO		19th	136	
