= Towerby =

- Location within Gauteng Location within South Africa
- Coordinates: 26.255°S 28.046°E
- Country: South Africa
- Province: Gauteng
- Municipality: City of Johannesburg
- Main Place: Johannesburg
- Established: 1953

Area
  - Total: 0.23 km^{2} (0.089 sq mi)

Population (2011)
  - Total: 751
  - Density: 3,300/km^{2} (8,500/sq mi)

Racial makeup (2011)
  - Black African: 51.7%
  - Coloured: 10.8%
  - Indian/Asian: 4.7%
  - White: 28.8%
  - Other: 4.1%

First languages (2011)
  - English: 37.2%
  - Afrikaans: 14.9%
  - Zulu: 14.9%
  - Sotho: 5.2%
  - Other: 27.8%
- Time zone: UTC+2 (SAST)
- Postal code (street): 2190

Towerby is a suburb of Johannesburg, South Africa. This small suburb is tucked between Forest Hill and Rosettenville. It is located in Region F of the City of Johannesburg Metropolitan Municipality.

== History ==
Prior to the discovery of gold on the Witwatersrand in 1886, the suburb lay on land on one of the original farms called Turffontein. It became a suburb on 18 March 1953 taking its name from a nearby water tower.
