= Lee Murchison =

American football player (1938–2017)

No. 80
- Position: Wide receiver

Personal information
- Born: April 16, 1938; Arkansas, U.S.
- Died: June 13, 2017 (aged 79); Stockton, California, U.S.
- Listed height: 6 ft 3 in (1.91 m)
- Listed weight: 205 lb (93 kg)

Career information
- High school: Placer (CA)
- College: Pacific
- NFL draft: 1960: 6th round, 70th overall pick
- AFL draft: 1960

Career history
- San Francisco 49ers (1960); Dallas Cowboys (1961)

Career NFL statistics
- Games played: 14
- Stats at Pro Football Reference

Ola Lee Murchison (April 16, 1938 – June 13, 2017) was a wide receiver in the National Football League (NFL) for the Dallas Cowboys. He played college football at the College of the Pacific.

== Early life ==
Murchison lived in a house without any electricity or running water. He attended Washington High School, before transferring to Placer High School. He practiced football, basketball, and track. He also composed the school's alma mater song.

He began playing organized football against his parents’ wishes as a sophomore. He played defensive end, receiving All-Northern California and All-sierra honors as a senior. In basketball, he helped the team win the Kendall Arnett Memorial Tournament as a senior in 1955.

In track, he competed in the 100-yard dash, 220-yard dash and the high jump. As a senior, he won the CIF Sac-Joaquin Section 100 and 220-yard dashes and placed seventh in the California Interscholastic Federation state meet in the 100.

Murchison accepted a football scholarship from the College of the Pacific. He was a two-way player at offensive end and linebacker. During his college career, he suffered injuries in both of his knees. He also practiced track.

In 2013, he was inducted into the African American Athletes Hall of Fame of Stockton.

== Professional career ==
=== San Francisco 49ers ===
Murchison was selected by the San Francisco 49ers in the sixth round (70th overall) of the 1960 NFL draft. He was waived on September 4, 1961.

=== Dallas Cowboys ===
On September 7, 1961, he was claimed off waivers by the Dallas Cowboys, where he was a backup wide receiver. He was released before the start of the 1962 season, because he suffered chronic knee problems.

== Personal life ==
After football, he was a music teacher at Hamilton Middle School and later became an administrator. In 1999, he retired as Franklin High School's principal. He earned a real estate license and had his own business in Stockton. He composed the Foresthill High School hymn "Stand up for Foresthill High".

Murchison owned a restaurant (Starlight Café), was a reserve police officer for the Stockton Police Department and had a pilot license. On June 13, 2017, he died after falling and undergoing surgery to repair an hematoma injury on his brain.
