= Forest Hill, Nova Scotia =

Forest Hill, Nova Scotia could be the following places in Nova Scotia, Canada:

- Forest Hill, Guysborough, Nova Scotia, in Guysborough County
- Forest Hill, Kings, Nova Scotia, in Kings County
- Forest Hills, Nova Scotia, a subdivision in Cole Harbour and Westphal in the Halifax Regional Municipality
