= Isaiah Piñeiro =

Puerto Rican basketball player (born 1995)

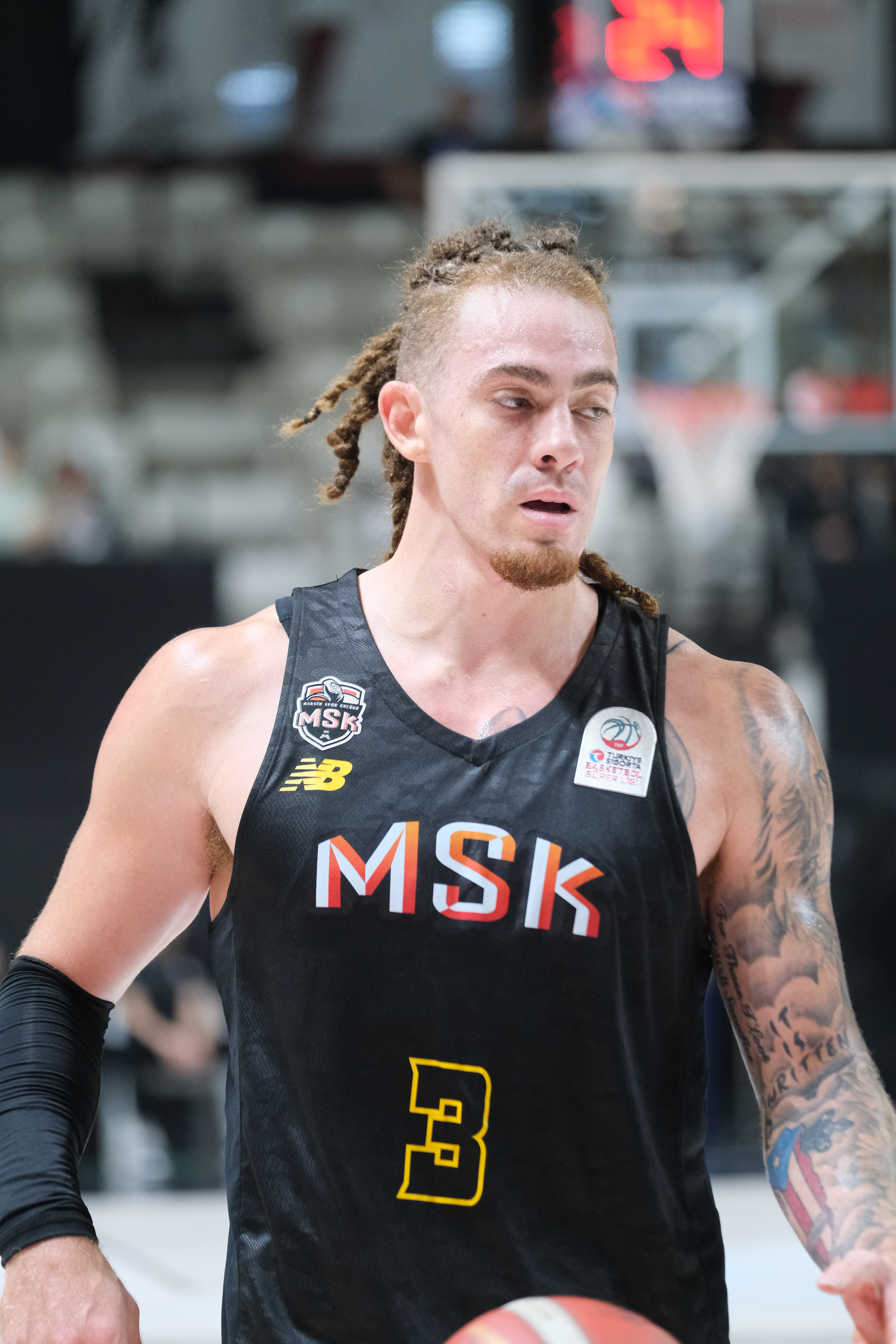
- Piñeiro with Mersin MSK in 2024

No. 0 – Soles de Mexicali
- Position: Power forward / small forward
- League: LNBP

Personal information
- Born: February 2, 1995 (age 31) Auburn, California, U.S.
- Listed height: 6 ft 7 in (2.01 m)
- Listed weight: 221 lb (100 kg)

Career information
- High school: Placer (Auburn, California)
- College: Sierra CC (2014–2015); Portland State (2015–2016); San Diego (2017–2019)
- NBA draft: 2019: undrafted
- Playing career: 2019–present

Career history
- 2019–2020: Stockton Kings
- 2020–2021: VEF Rīga
- 2021–2022: Darüşşafaka
- 2022–2023: Piratas de Quebradillas
- 2023: VEF Rīga
- 2024: Palencia
- 2024–2025: Mersin MSK
- 2025–2026: Cangrejeros de Santurce
- 2026–present: Soles de Mexicali

Career highlights
- LBL champion (2021); 2× First-team All-WCC (2018, 2019)
- Stats at Basketball Reference

Isaiah Piñeiro (born February 2, 1995) is a Puerto Rican professional basketball player for Soles de Mexicali of the Liga Nacional de Baloncesto Profesional (LNBP) and the Puerto Rican national team. Standing at a height of 6 ft 7 in (2.01 m), he plays the power forward and small forward positions.

== High school career ==
Piñeiro was born in Auburn, California, United States to parents of Puerto Rican descent. Piñeiro attended Placer High School, where he played both football and basketball. In football, Piñeiro was the team's defensive MVP and earned All-League and All-State honors. In basketball, he was a two-time team MVP and earned All-League and All-Section honors. And won MVP on Master Tournament at Turabo Heights

== College career ==
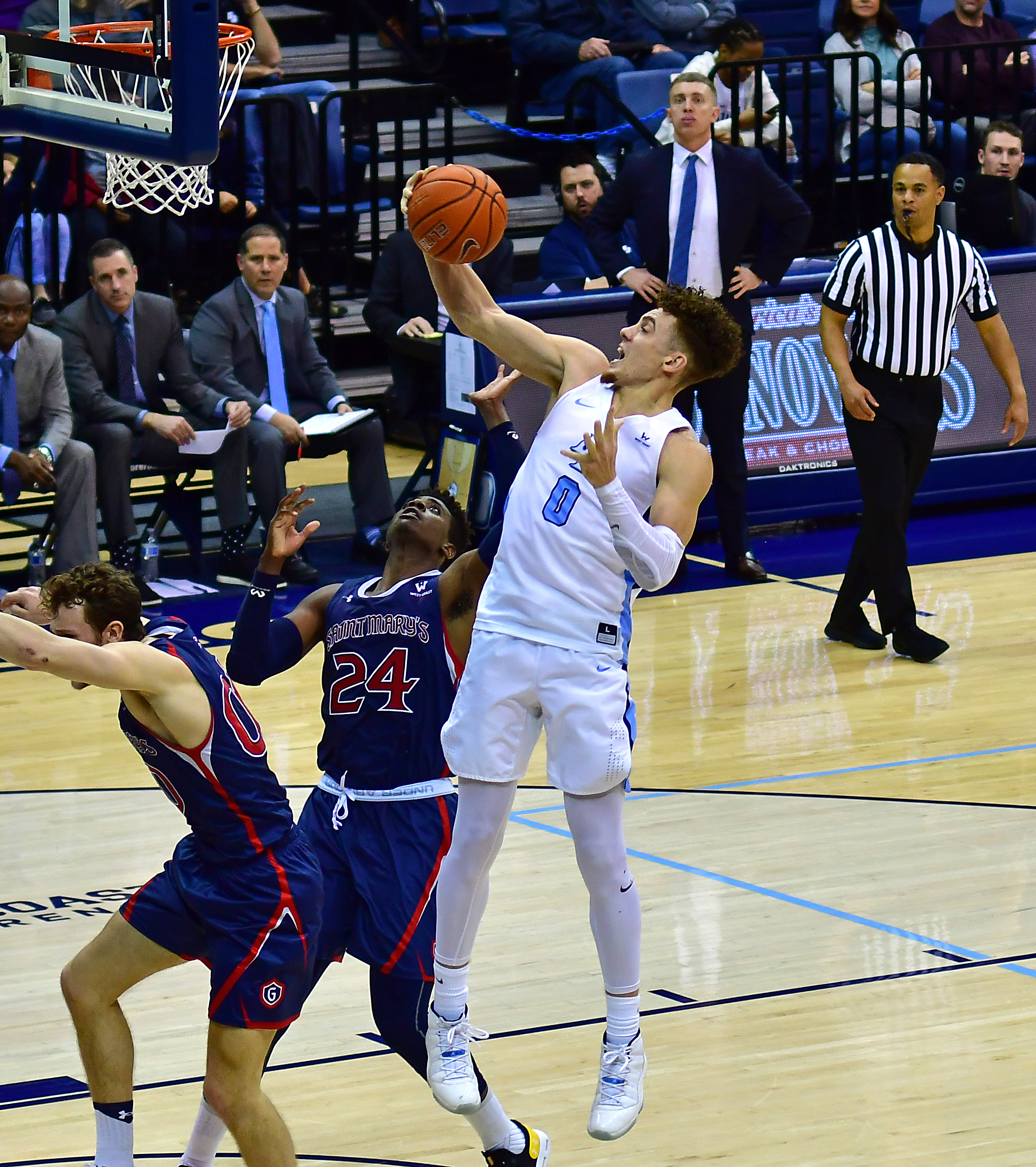
Piñeiro playing for San Diego

Piñeiro began his collegiate career with Sierra College, where he averaged 15.4 points and 7.4 rebounds per game as a freshman. He then transferred to Portland State, where he played all 31 games in his sophomore season averaging 12.0 points and 5.5 rebounds, while shooting 50.7 from the field and 76.3 from the free throw line.

Piñeiro sat out the 2016–17 season after transferring to San Diego. In his redshirt junior year, Piñeiro earned First-team All-WCC honors as he led the team in scoring (15.7 ppg) and rebounding (6.2 rpg), while averaging 49.1 from the field and 78.3 from the free throw line. In his redshirt senior year, Piñeiro earned another First-team All-WCC as he became the all-time leader in single-season points (677 points), field goals made (232), and games played (36).

== Professional career ==
=== Stockton Kings (2019–2020) ===
After going undrafted in the 2019 NBA draft, Piñeiro was named a member of the Sacramento Kings for the 2019 NBA Summer League season. Over 5 games, he averaged 4.6 points in 14 minutes per game.

On July 30, 2019, Piñeiro signed with the Sacramento Kings, a reported one-year partially guaranteed contract. On October 11, 2019, Piñeiro was waived by the Kings but was ultimately signed to their NBA G League affiliate, the Stockton Kings. On December 15, 2019, Piñeiro tallied 24 points, 16 rebounds and six steals in a victory over the South Bay Lakers. He averaged 9.6 points and 5 rebounds per game.

=== VEF Rīga (2020–2021) ===
On August 5, 2020, Piñeiro signed with VEF Rīga of the Latvian-Estonian league.

=== Darüşşafaka (2021–2022) ===
On June 28, 2021, he has signed with Darüşşafaka Tekfen of the Basketball Super League.

=== Mersin MSK (2024–2025) ===
On July 24, 2024, he signed with Mersin MSK of the Basketbol Süper Ligi (BSL).

== National team career ==
Piñeiro was named in the preliminary 17-man roster of Puerto Rico for the 2019 FIBA Basketball World Cup. On August, 28, 2019, it was announced that Piñeiro had made the Puerto Rican squad for the tournament.

On August 31, 2019, Piñeiro made his debut for the 2019 FIBA Basketball World Cup.

== Career statistics ==
Legend
GP	Games played	GS	Games started	MPG	Minutes per game
FG%	Field goal percentage	3P%	3-point field goal percentage	FT%	Free throw percentage
RPG	Rebounds per game	APG	Assists per game	SPG	Steals per game
BPG	Blocks per game	PPG	Points per game	**Bold**	Career high

=== College ===
Year	Team	GP	GS	MPG	FG%	3P%	FT%	RPG	APG	SPG	BPG	PPG
2015–16	Portland State	31	20	22.8	**.507**	.321	.763	5.5	1.1	1.1	.5	12.0
2016–17	San Diego	Redshirt										
2017–18	San Diego	34	30	28.1	.491	**.346**	.783	6.2	**2.1**	**1.2**	**.8**	15.7
2018–19	San Diego	**36**	**36**	**34.7**	.487	.336	**.820**	**9.4**	**2.1**	**1.2**	.5	**18.8**
Career		101	86	28.8	.493	.338	.794	7.1	1.8	1.2	.6	15.7
