= Woodland Heights, Virginia =

- Woodland Heights Historic District
- U.S. National Register of Historic Places
- U.S. Historic district
- Virginia Landmarks Register
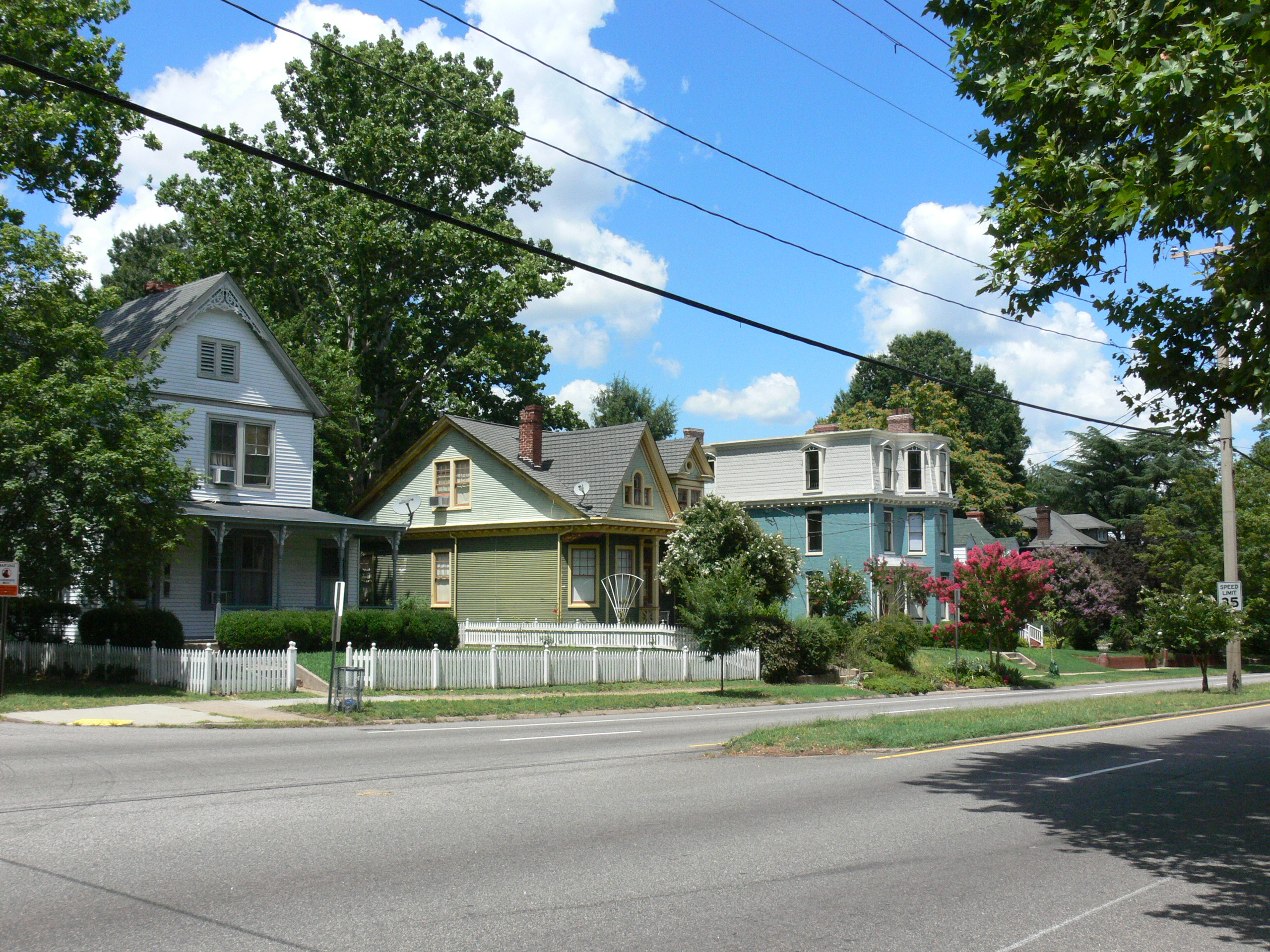

- Location within Virginia Location within the United States
- Location: Bounded by James River, W. 24th St., Bainbridge St. and Forest Hill Ave., and W. 32nd and 34th Sts., Richmond, Virginia
- Coordinates: 37°31′8″N 77°27′44″W
- Area: 245 acres (99 ha)
- Built: 1888
- Architect: Southside Land & Improvement Co.; et al.
- Architectural style: Late Victorian, Late 19th And 20th Century Revivals
- NRHP reference No.: 09000796
- VLR No.: 127-0830

Significant dates
- Added to NRHP: September 30, 2009
- Designated VLR: June 18, 2009

Woodland Heights is a neighborhood in the city of Richmond, Virginia. It began as a trolleycar neighborhood in the early 1900s and was built up along the James River beside Forest Hill Park. Woodland Heights is listed on the National Register of Historic Places and the Virginia Landmarks Registry.

== History ==
Woodland Heights was first advertised in 1891 as a luxury riverside retreat with proximity to downtown Richmond and Forest Hill Park. At this time, the "South Bank" of the James River was still mainly farms and woodlands along Old Manchester's western edge. Woodland Heights is the oldest of three sister neighborhoods built along the Rhodes trolley car line, along with Westover Hills and Forest Hill.

== Architecture ==
Amongst the first homes built in Woodland Heights was the T.D. Mann House. It was built in 1890 in the popular Victorian Queen Anne style.

Many subsequent homes built in Woodland Heights were of the American Four Square design from the Sears Roebuck catalog.

== Notable events ==
Woodland Heights holds an annual House Tour and craft fair. It is located within walking distance of Forest Hill Park, Canoe Run Park, and Carter Jones Park. Forest Hill Park holds a farmer's market on Sundays.
