= Bud Anderson =

American World War II flying ace (1922–2024)

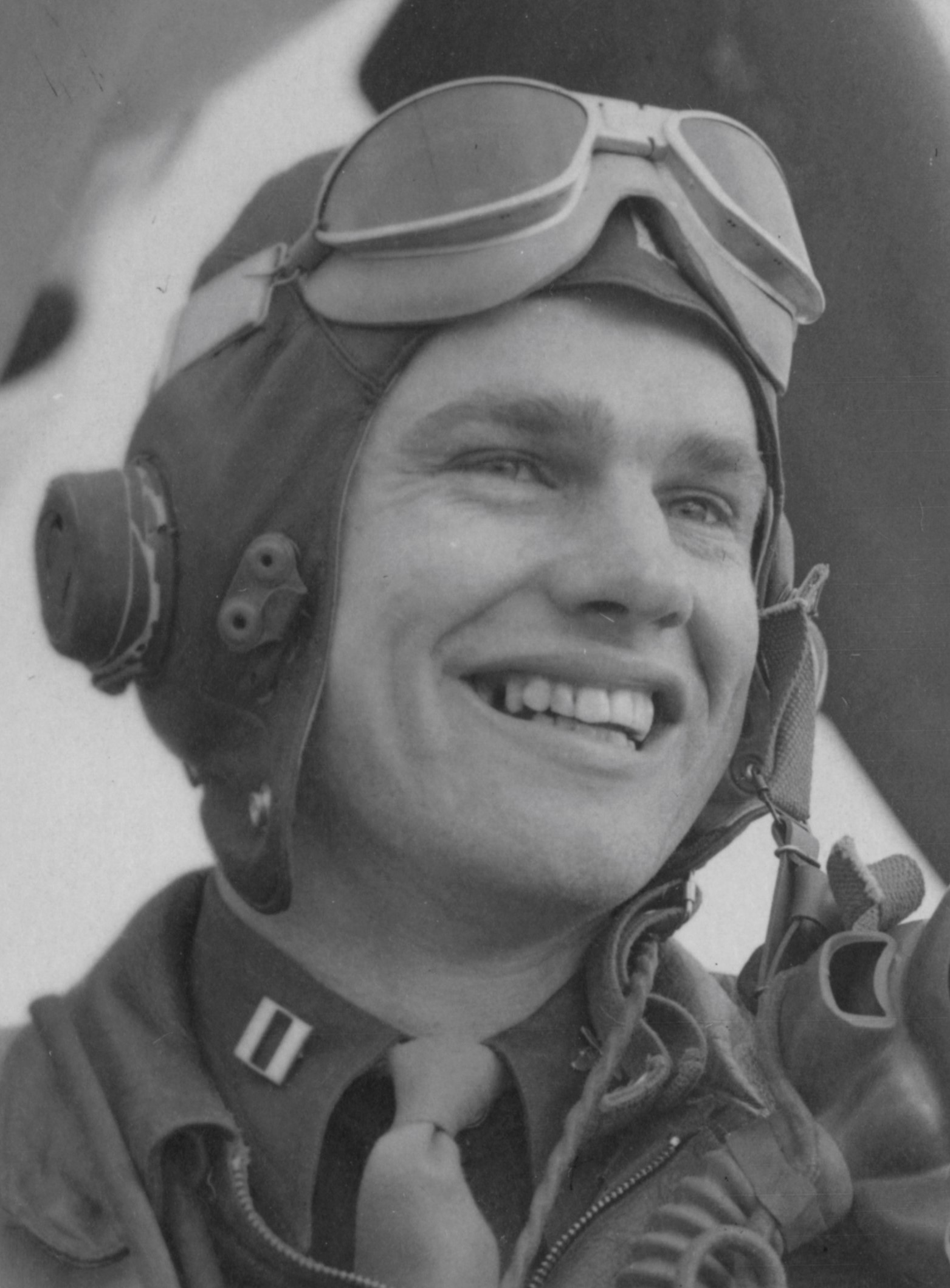
- Anderson in 1944
- Born: January 13, 1922; Oakland, California, U.S.
- Died: May 17, 2024 (aged 102); Auburn, California, U.S.
- Burial place: Arlington National Cemetery
- Spouse: Eleanor Cosby (m. 1945; died 2015)
- Children: 2
- Military career
- Allegiance: United States
- Branch: United States Army Air Forces; United States Air Force
- Service years: 1942–1972
- Rank: Colonel (retirement rank – 1972); Brigadier General (honorary promotion – 2022)
- Nickname: Bud
- Unit: 357th Fighter Group
- Commands: 69th Fighter-Bomber Squadron; 18th Tactical Fighter Wing; 355th Tactical Fighter Wing
- Conflicts: World War II; Vietnam War
- Awards: Legion of Merit (2); Distinguished Flying Cross (5); Bronze Star Medal; Air Medal (16)
- Other work: Manager of the McDonnell Aircraft Company's Flight Test Facility at Edwards AFB (1972–1998)

Clarence Emil "Bud" Anderson (January 13, 1922 – May 17, 2024) was an officer in the United States Air Force and a triple ace of World War II. During the war he was the highest scoring flying ace in his P-51 Mustang squadron.

Toward the end of Anderson's two combat tours in Europe in 1944 he was promoted to major at 22, a young age even for a highly effective officer in wartime. Afterward, he became a test pilot and a fighter squadron and wing commander, serving a combat tour in the Vietnam War.

Anderson retired as a full colonel in 1972, after which he worked in flight test management for McDonnell Douglas. A member of the National Aviation Hall of Fame, he continued to speak at aviation and military events well into his 90s. He received an honorary promotion to brigadier general in 2022.

== Early life ==
Anderson was born on January 13, 1922, in Oakland, California, and raised on a farm near Newcastle, California. He graduated from Placer Union High School in Auburn, California. In high school, he played football and basketball. He was introduced to aviation at Oakland Municipal Airport. He was working at the Sacramento Air Depot during the Japanese attack on Pearl Harbor on December 7, 1941.

== Military career ==
In January 1942, shortly after Japan attacked Pearl Harbor, Anderson enlisted in the United States Army as an aviation cadet. He completed Primary Flight Training at Lindbergh Field, San Diego, and his Advanced Training at Luke Field, Arizona. He received his wings and commission as a second lieutenant in the United States Army Air Forces at Hamilton Field, California in September 1942.

Anderson began flying Bell P-39 Airacobras with the 329th Fighter Squadron of the 328th Fighter Group at Hamilton Field and then at the Oakland Municipal Airport, from September 1942 to March 1943. He was later assigned to the 363rd Fighter Squadron of the 357th Fighter Group at Tonopah, Nevada, in March 1943, moving to bases in California from May to October 1943, then at Casper, Wyoming, from October to November 1943, and deploying to England in November 1943.

=== World War II ===
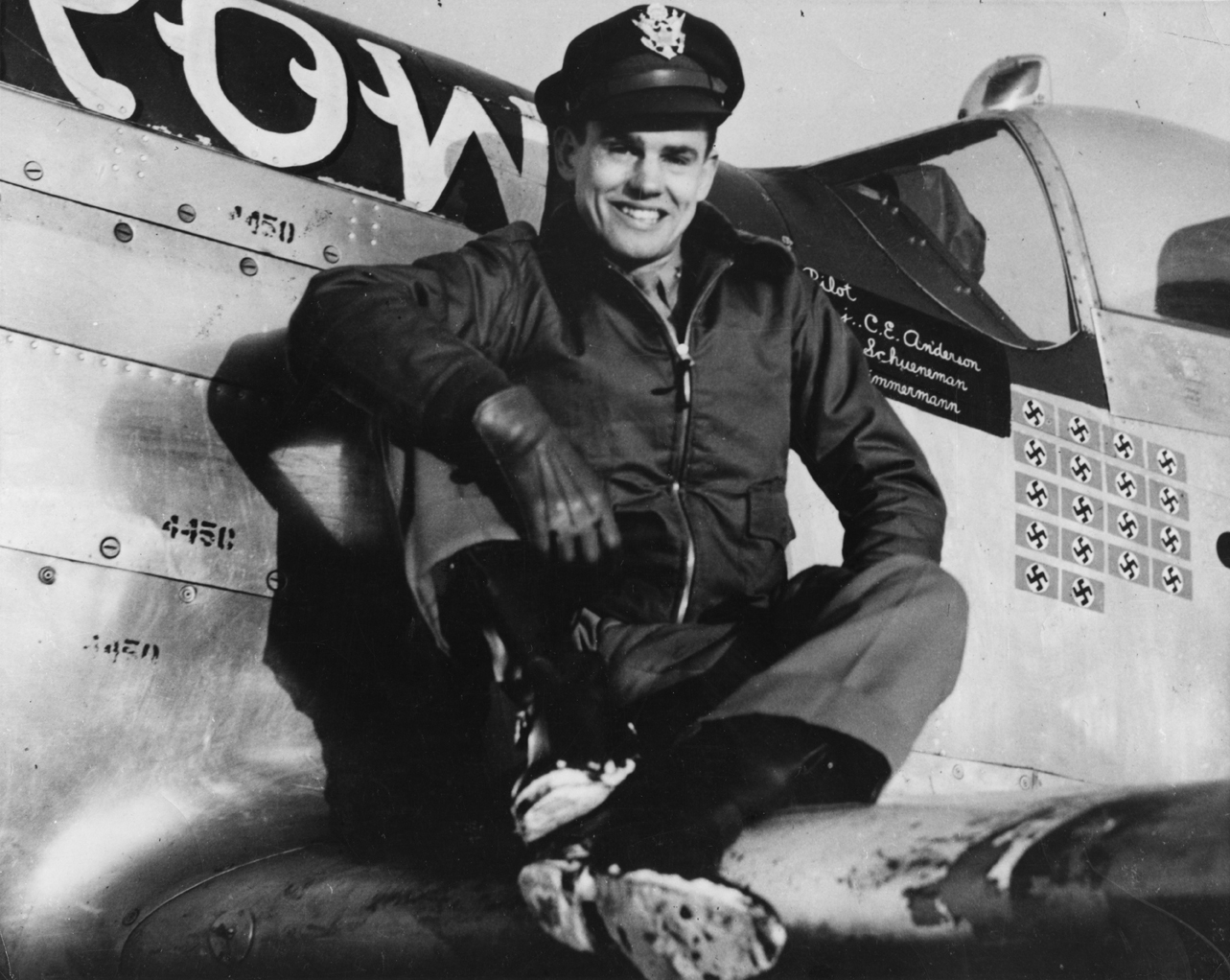
Anderson onboard his P-51D-10-NA Mustang 'Old Crow'

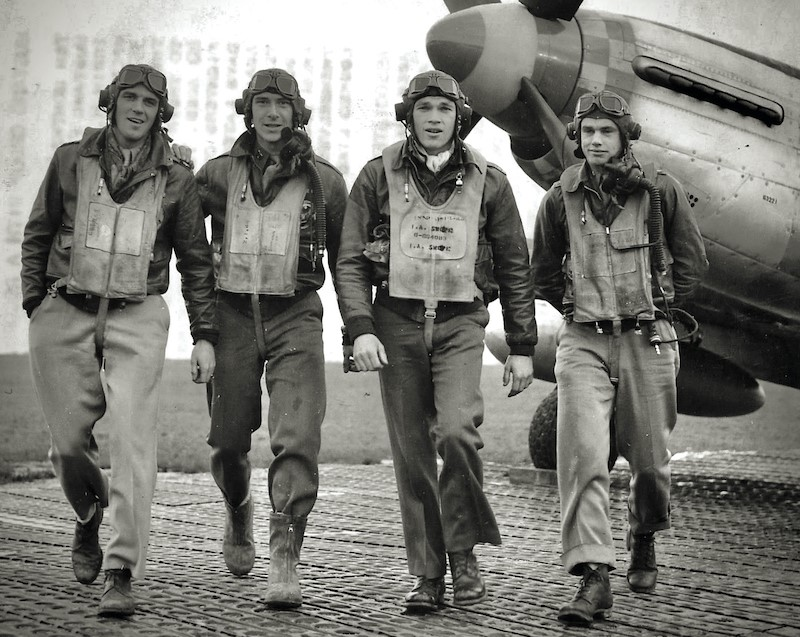
The top scoring fighter aces of the 357th Fighter Group. L-R; Richard Peterson, Leonard Carson, John England, and Clarence Anderson.

The 357th Fighter Group was stationed at RAF Leiston. The group was equipped with the North American P-51 Mustang in January 1944. On 5 February he claimed a Messerschmitt Bf 109 that was attacking a straggling B-17 Flying Fortress north of Dessau, damaged as his first aerial victory. On April 11, he claimed another Me 109 west of Hanover at 11:10 and damaged a second 20 minutes later. On the same mission, he and two other members of his flight took turns in shooting down a Heinkel He 111 bomber that was landing at an airfield in Hanover, resulting in the bomber crashing. The three of them shared the aerial victory. Anderson shot down a Bf 109 over Frankfurt on May 12 for his fifth aerial victory, making him a flying ace. Before the end of May, he destroyed three more enemy aircraft.

On June 29, Anderson led his fighter squadron on a bomber escort mission over Leipzig. Over the target, the squadron encountered eight Focke-Wulf Fw 190s attempting to attack the bomber formation. He shot down the lead Fw 190, then two more. In July, after scoring his twelfth aerial victory, he took leave and returned to the United States.

That fall, Anderson returned to 357th Fighter Group. On November 27 he shot down two Fw 190s over Magdeburg and forced another to crash land as he attempted to shoot it, crediting him with two aerial victories and one probable. On December 5, while leading a fighter escort of bombers over Berlin, the escort was attacked by a formation of 20 Fw 190s. In the dogfight, he shot down two, his final aerial victories.

Anderson flew two tours of combat against the Luftwaffe in Europe while with the 363d Fighter Squadron of the 357th Fighter Group and was the group's third leading ace with 16 1/4 aerial victories. The others only flew one tour, so they had less time in the air. His first P-51 Mustang (P-51B-15-NA AAF Ser. No. 43-24823) and his second (P-51D-10-NA Mustang, AAF Ser. No. 44-14450 B6-S), both nicknamed Old Crow, after the whiskey of the same name, carried him safely through 116 missions without being hit by fire from enemy aircraft, and without Anderson ever having to turn back for any reason.

=== Post-war ===
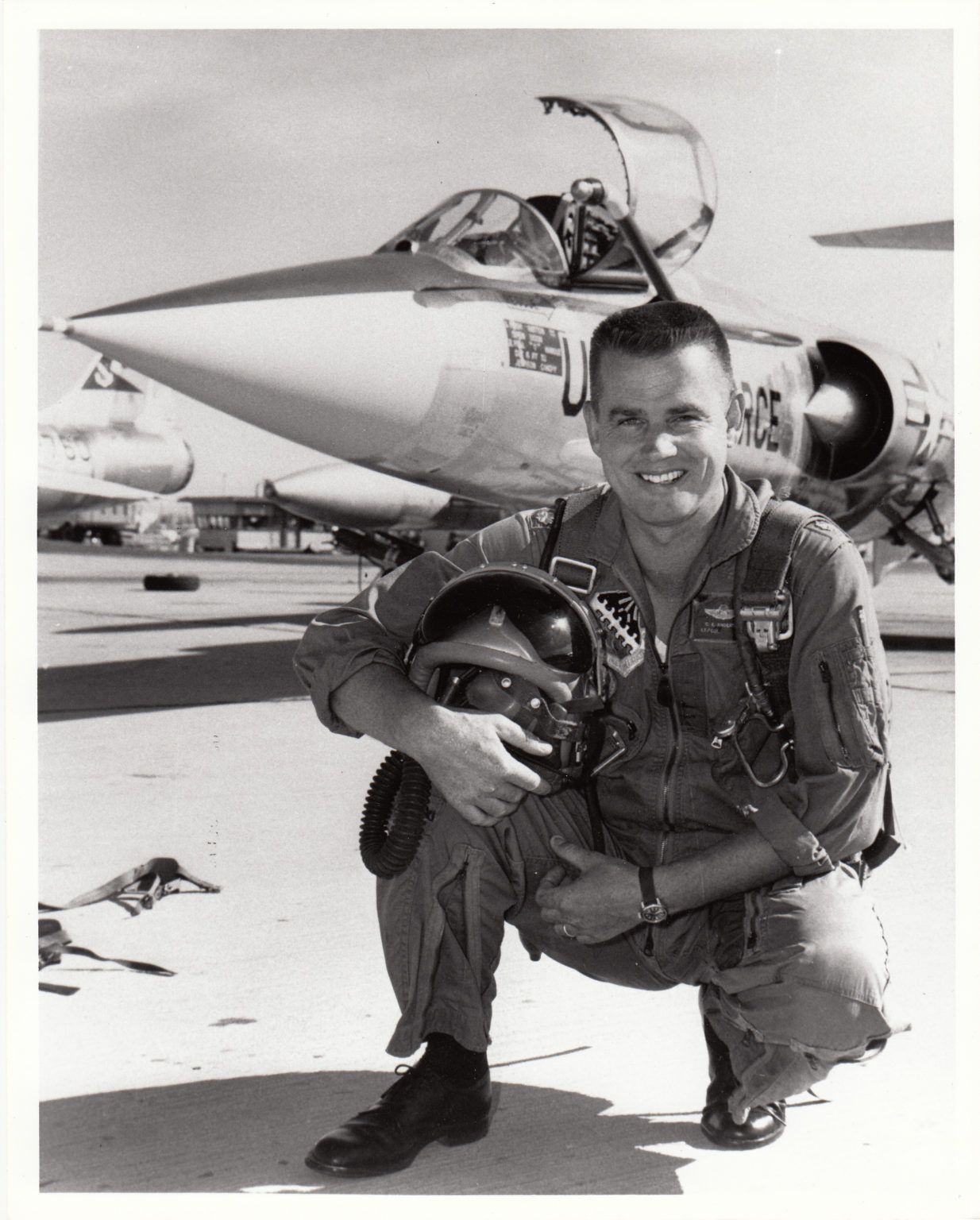
Anderson as a test pilot at Edwards AFB

In January 1945, Anderson returned to the U.S., serving at Perrin Field, Texas, until that October, when he was assigned as a recruiter in Ohio. He served as a test pilot at Wright Field from May 1948 to February 1953. During this time, he took part in the FICON project, a concept to increase the effective combat radius of jet fighters by attaching them to a propeller-driven bomber, one hooked up to each wingtip. The hope was that it would increase fuel efficiency and effective range, and allow the bomber to carry its own fighter escort deep into enemy territory.

Anderson attended Air Command and Staff College at Maxwell Air Force Base, Alabama, from September 1954 to August 1955, and then was assigned as Director of Operations for the 58th Fighter-Bomber Wing at Osan Air Base, South Korea, from August 1955 to February 1956 and commander of the 69th Fighter-Bomber Squadron at Osan, from February to August 1956.

Anderson continued as a test pilot and was assigned as Assistant Chief and then Chief of the Flight Test Operations Division at Edwards Air Force Base from November 1957 to August 1962. He attended the Army War College at Carlisle Barracks, Pennsylvania, from August 1962 to July 1963. From August 1965 to December 1967, he was stationed at Kadena Air Base in Okinawa where he served as deputy director, director of operations and commander of the 18th Tactical Fighter Wing.

After serving another tour at the Air Force headquarters in the Pentagon until December 1969, Anderson commanded the 355th Tactical Fighter Wing, an F-105 Thunderchief unit, during its final months of service in the Vietnam War, from June to December 1970. Stationed at Takhli Royal Thai Air Force Base, he flew 25 missions in strikes against enemy supply lines and later was in charge of closing the base when 355th TFW was inactivated.

Anderson retired as a colonel in March 1972. He was decorated 25 times for his service to the United States, during which he flew over 100 types of aircraft and logged over 7,000 hours. He was a close friend of Brigadier General Chuck Yeager during and after the end of World War II, where both served in the 357th Fighter Group.

== Personal life and death ==
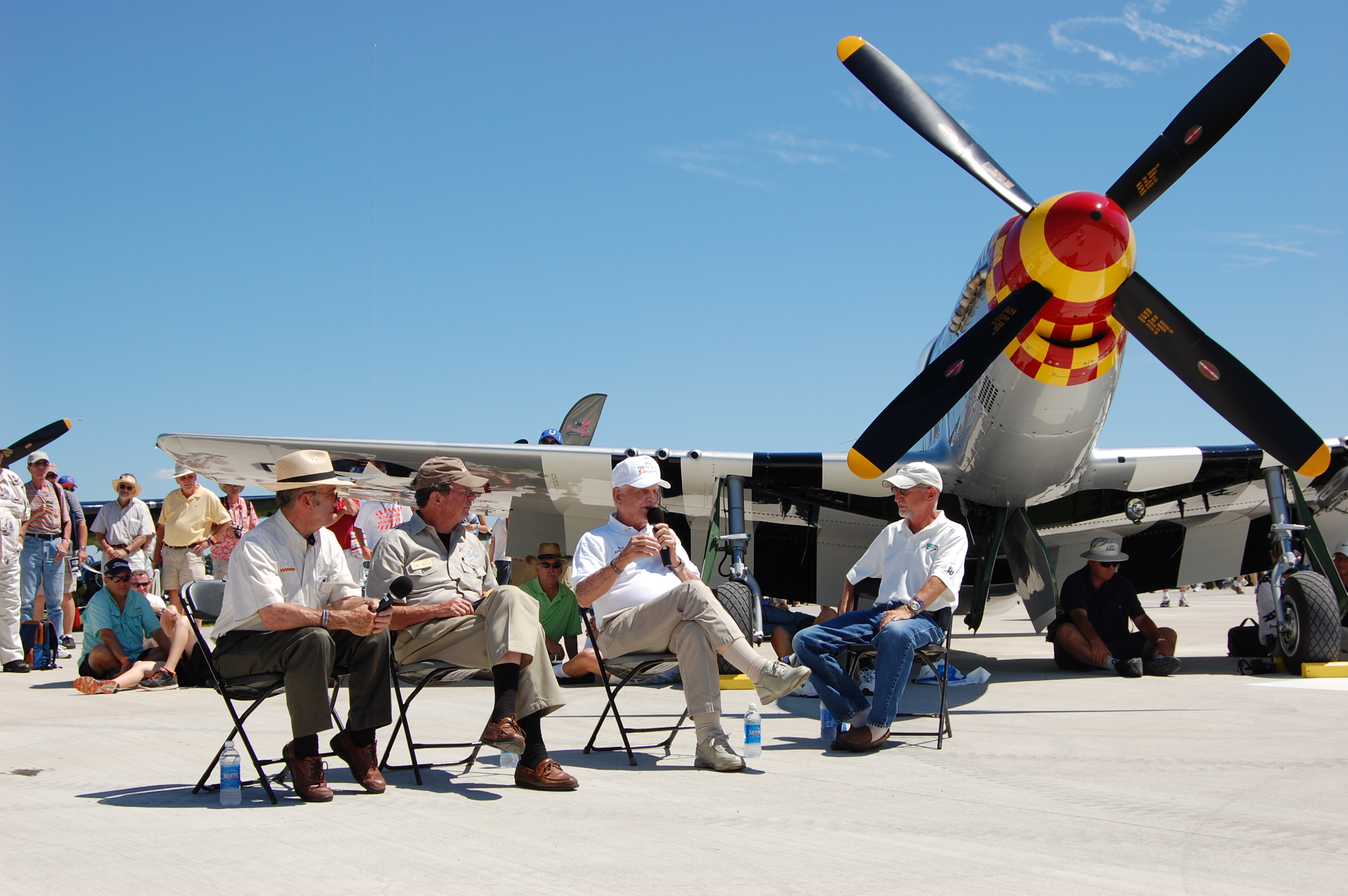
Anderson, seated second from the right in 2011

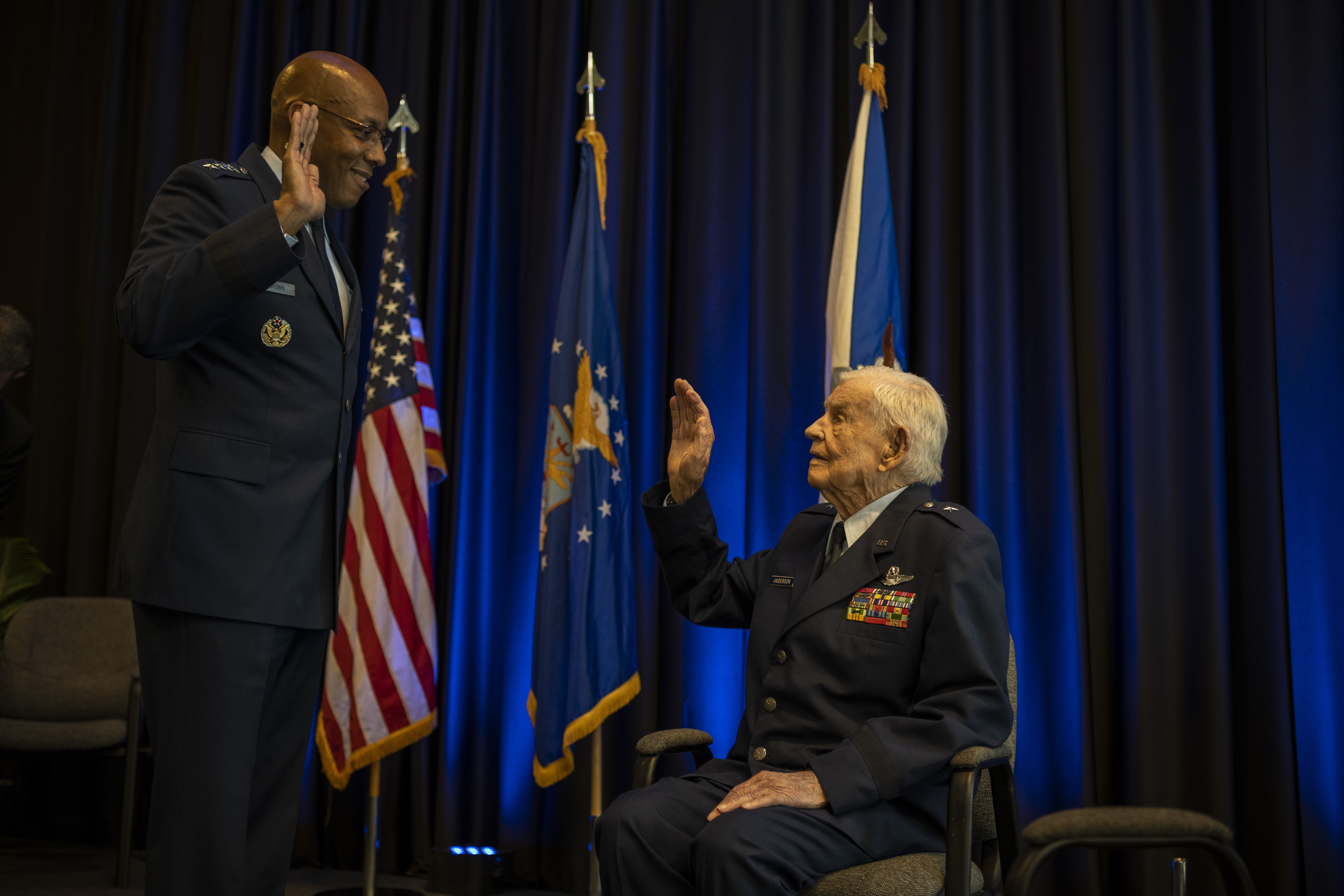
The Chief of Staff of the United States Air Force Charles Q. Brown Jr. administers the reaffirmation of the oath of office to Anderson, after promoting him to the honorary rank of brigadier general, 2022

Anderson married Eleanor Cosby, on February 23, 1945. She died on January 30, 2015, in Auburn, California, just four days before her 92nd birthday, and is buried at Arlington National Cemetery. They had two children.

After his retirement from active duty as a colonel, Anderson became the manager of the McDonnell Aircraft Company's Flight Test Facility at Edwards AFB, serving there until 1998. In 1990, he cowrote the book To Fly & Fight—Memoirs of a Triple Ace.

In 2005, Anderson appeared on the pilot episode of the History Channel series Dogfights. The episode, "The Greatest Air Battles", features his May 27, 1944, mission, with Anderson recounting his experience.

On July 19, 2008, Anderson was inducted into the National Aviation Hall of Fame. In 2013, he was inducted into the International Air & Space Hall of Fame at the San Diego Air & Space Museum. A life-size bronze statue of him was installed at the Auburn Municipal Airport.

In 2015, he and other flying aces received the Congressional Gold Medal in recognition of "their heroic military service and defense of the country's freedom throughout the history of aviation warfare."

Anderson turned 100 in January 2022. His hometown Auburn honored him with a grand celebration. He was the last living American triple flying ace of World War II. On December 2, he was promoted to the honorary rank of brigadier general by General Charles Q. Brown Jr., the Air Force chief of staff at the Aerospace Museum of California.

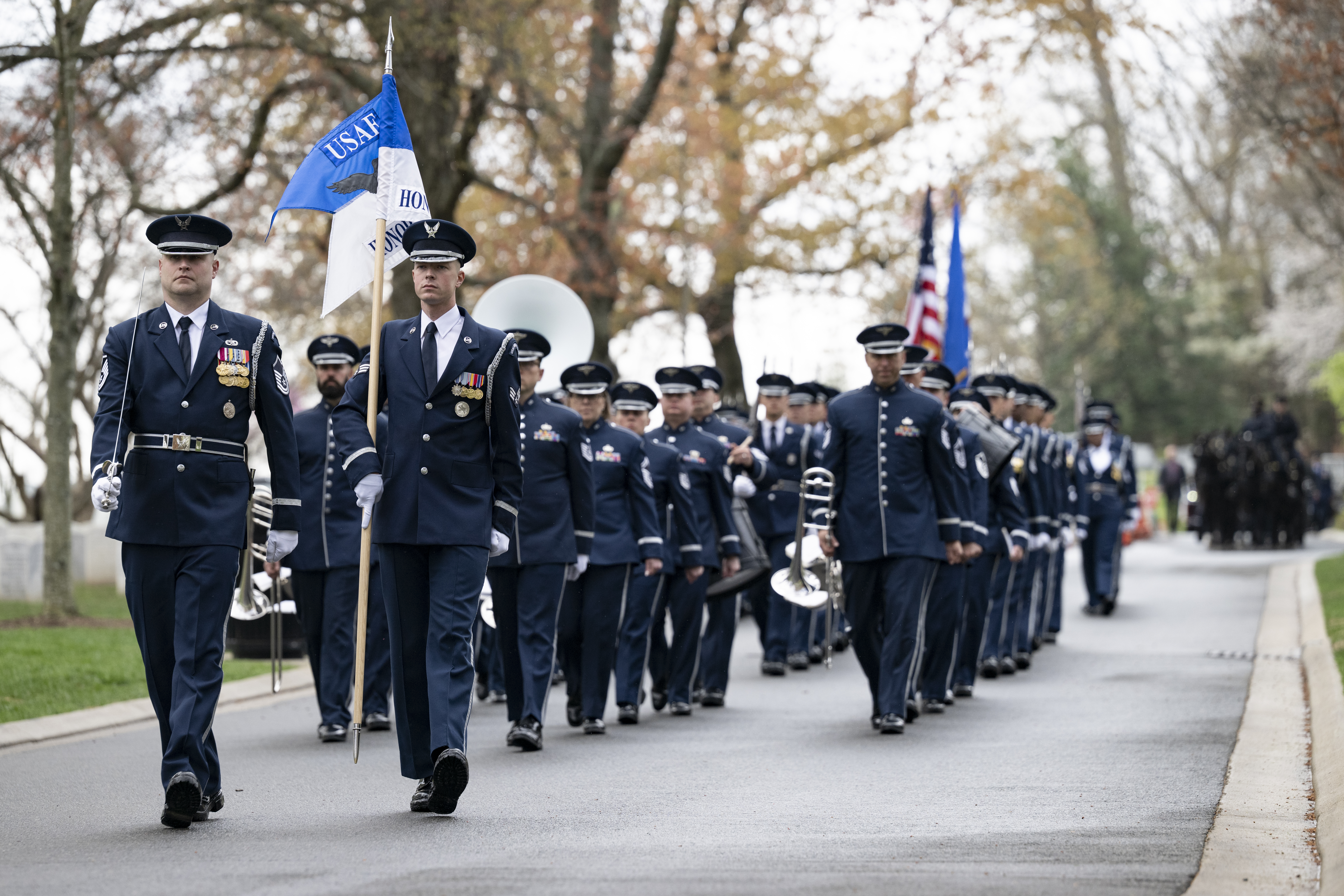
Anderson's funeral at Arlington National Cemetery, 30 March 2026

Anderson died in his sleep at his home in Auburn, California, on May 17, 2024, at the age of 102. A life-sized bronze statue of Anderson, dressed in his leather flight helmet and goggles and wearing a parachute, was installed in Grass Valley, California about three months after his death. On March 30, 2026, Anderson was buried with full military honors at Arlington National Cemetery.

== Aerial victory credits ==
Date	#	Type	Location	Aircraft flown	Unit Assigned
March 8, 1944	1	Messerschmitt Bf 109	Hanover, Germany	P-51B	363 FS, 357 FG
April 11, 1944	1; 0.25	Bf 109; Heinkel He 111	Hanover, Germany	P-51B	363 FS, 357 FG
April 30, 1944	1	Focke-Wulf Fw 190	Orléans, France	P-51B	363 FS, 357 FG
May 8, 1944	1	Fw 190	Soltau, Germany	P-51B	363 FS, 357 FG
May 12, 1944	1	Bf 109	Frankfurt, Germany	P-51B	363 FS, 357 FG
May 27, 1944	2	Bf 109	Strasbourg, France	P-51B	363 FS, 357 FG
May 30, 1944	1	Bf 109	Schönebeck, Germany	P-51B	363 FS, 357 FG
June 29, 1944	3	Fw 190	Leipzig, Germany	P-51B	363 FS, 357 FG
July 7, 1944	1	Bf 109	Leipzig, Germany	P-51B	363 FS, 357 FG
November 27, 1944	2	Fw 190	Magdeburg, Germany	P-51D	363 FS, 357 FG
December 5, 1944	2	Fw 190	Berlin, Germany	P-51D	363 FS, 357 FG

SOURCES: Air Force Historical Study 85: USAF Credits for the Destruction of Enemy Aircraft, World War II

== Awards ==
Anderson earned 25 awards, including:

Command pilot

Legion of Merit with one bronze oak leaf cluster
Distinguished Flying Cross with four bronze oak leaf clusters
Bronze Star Medal
Air Medal with three silver oak leaf clusters
Air Force Commendation Medal
Air Force Presidential Unit Citation
Air Force Outstanding Unit Award
American Campaign Medal
European-African-Middle Eastern Campaign Medal with four bronze service stars
World War II Victory Medal
National Defense Service Medal with one bronze service star
Vietnam Service Medal with two service stars
Korea Defense Service Medal (Note: As Anderson served in fighter units stationed in South Korea from 1955 to 1956, this award was retroactively awarded when it was created in 2004.)
Air Force Longevity Service Award with one silver and one bronze oak leaf clusters
Small Arms Expert Marksmanship Ribbon
Knight of the Legion of Honour (France)
Croix de Guerre with silver star (France)
Gallantry Cross unit citation with palm^{†}
Vietnam Campaign Medal

^{†} Not shown.

- American Fighter Aces Association life member
- Fellow, Society of Experimental Test Pilots
- Aerospace Walk of Honor, 1993
- Crystal Eagle Award, 2011
- Congressional Gold Medal, May 2015

== Bibliography ==
- Anderson, Colonel Clarence "Bud" with Joseph P. Hamelin. To Fly and Fight, Memoirs of a Triple Ace, Pacifica Military History, Library of Congress. ISBN 0-935553-34-7
