= Forest Hill Park (Richmond, Virginia) =

Listed on the National Register of Historic Places in Richmond, Virginia

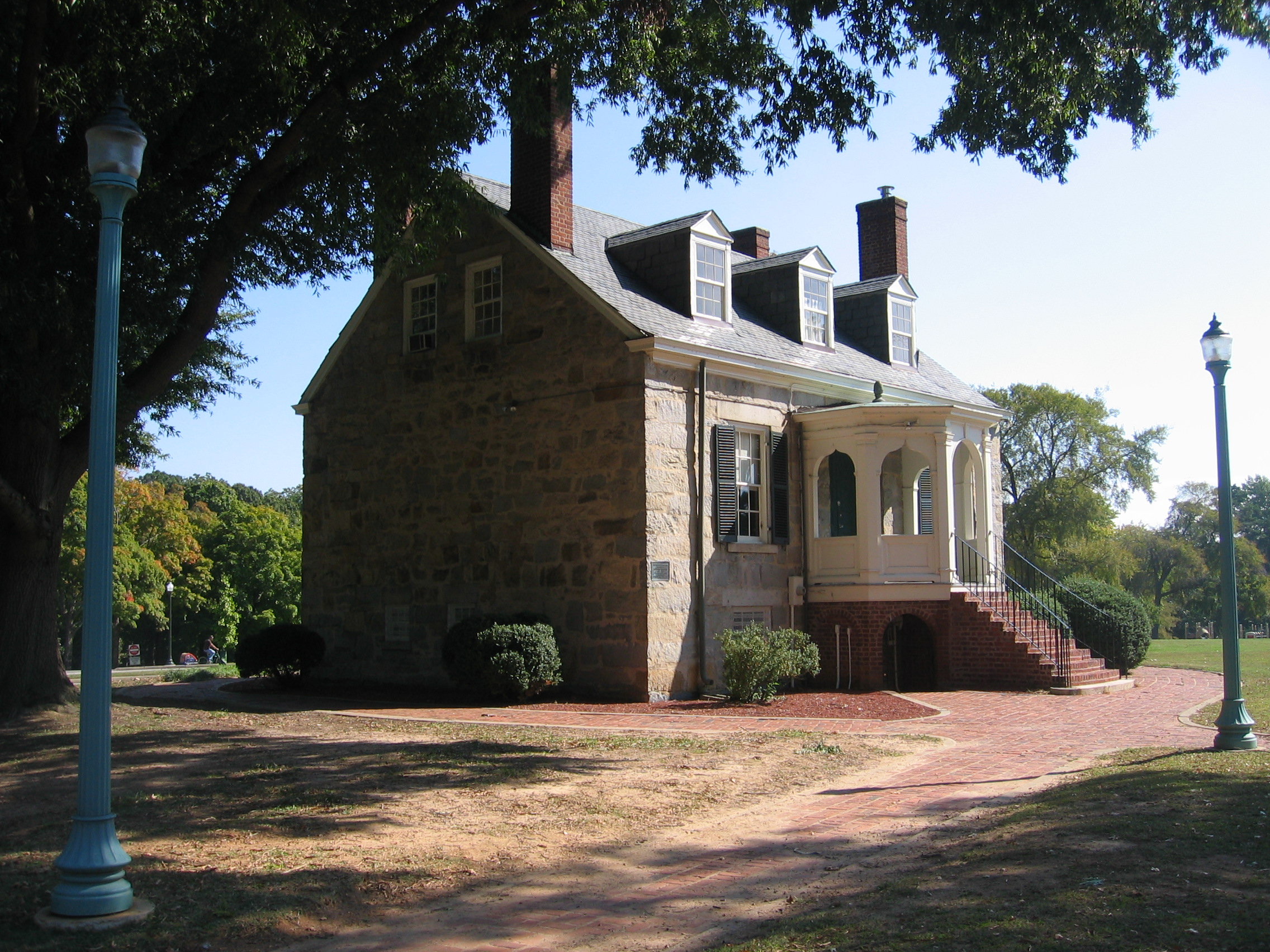
- Holden Rhodes house in Forest Hill Park
- Interactive map of Forest Hill Park
- Type: Public park
- Location: Forest Hill Avenue, Richmond, Virginia, U.S.
- Coordinates: 37°31′10″N 77°28′24″W
- Area: 105 acres (42 ha)
- Created: c. 1933
- Open: Year-round
- Forest Hill Park
- U.S. National Register of Historic Places
- U.S. Historic district
- Virginia Landmarks Register
- Location within Virginia Location within the United States
- Area: 105.2 acres (42.6 ha)
- Built: 1843
- Architect: Gilbert, Ernest R.
- Architectural style: Greek Revival, Bungalow/craftsman
- NRHP reference No.: 02001446
- VLR No.: 127-6027

Significant dates
- Added to NRHP: November 22, 2002
- Designated VLR: September 11, 2002

Forest Hill Park, known for its "Stone house" called Boscobel, is a historic 105-acre (0.4 km^{2}) urban park in Richmond, Virginia. Starting as a private property, the park has had several owners and uses before its present one, the City of Richmond.

== History ==
The first documented owner was William Byrd III (1728–1777), son of William Byrd II (1674–1744), founder of the city of Richmond. Like his father, the younger Byrd owned extensive properties in Richmond along the James River, and in 1768 he sought to repay his extensive gambling debts by auctioning off 100 of his lots in a public auction. As a result, some 1,730 acres (7 km^{2}) between Reedy Creek and Powhite Creek came to be owned by Bernard Markham.

=== Rhodes family ===
In 1820, Holden Rhodes (born Canada, 1798–99; died Richmond, Virginia, 1857) a graduate of Middlebury College in Middlebury, Vermont, went to Manchester, near Richmond, to tutor the sons of Judge Samuel Taylor. Rhodes eventually studied law and became a noted jurist in the Chesterfield County court systems, as well as a railroad entrepreneur, being one of the first presidents of the Richmond and Petersburg Railroad, chartered in 1836 and opened in 1838 (later the Atlantic Coast Line, now part of CSX Transportation).

After Rhodes married Eliza Anne Cunliffe Heth (daughter of Midlothian coal mine owner John Cunliffe and widow of Henry Heth, the son of Harry Heth, another coal mine owner) in 1833, he purchased 103 acres (0.4 km^{2}), known as "Dunstan's," from John N. Dunstan, Jr. Rhodes built his country estate, "Boscobel" (from bosco bello, Italian for "beautiful woods" ) some time between 1836 and 1843. The house, now known as the Old Stone House in Forest Hill Park, was constructed of granite that is believed to have been quarried on the property. When Rhodes died in 1857, his estate passed to his nephew and adopted son, Charles H. Rhodes, Jr.

In 1862, during the American Civil War, young Rhodes sold the property to Richard D. Mitchell. The estate was eventually sold, in turn, to James and Charles Labott, and later to William H. Benson, who in 1871 sold it to a group of New York investors.

=== Amusement park ===
Forest Hill Amusement Park
- Entrance to Forest Hill Park, c. 1910
- Interactive map of Forest Hill Amusement Park
- Coordinates: 37°31′10″N 77°28′24″W
- Closed: 1932

In 1889, the former Rhodes property was sold to the Southside Land and Improvement Co., and became a terminus for the Forest Hill trolley, part of one of the first successful trolley systems in the United States. The Virginia Passenger and Power Company (later VEPCO, now Dominion Energy) took over the enterprise in 1925.

To attract passengers to the countryside, the Rhodes residence was converted into a trolley terminus, complete with wrap-around porch and belfry, and an elaborate turn-of-the-20th-century amusement park was built on the grounds, complete with carousel, roller coaster, fun house, dance hall, penny arcade, and golf course, as well as bath house, swimming area, and boat lake in the former quarry pond. The park remained a popular Richmond attraction until it closed in 1932, due to the economic constraints of the Great Depression.

=== City park ===
When the land was deeded to the City of Richmond in 1933, the wooden amusement structures were demolished to convert the dilapidated estate into a landscaped urban park. The Rhodes home was renovated to serve as a community library and meeting house, and the wooded ravine that once held a quarry pond and boating lake returned to its natural state.

During the Works Progress Administration (1935–1943), unemployed craftsmen and stonemasons working under the auspices of the National Relief Act were hired to pave the old park footpaths with cobblestones, adding a stone-and-slate octagonal gazebo and a small warming hut for use by winter ice-skaters. New landscaping features included a small azalea garden that later provided plant stock for the extensive Joseph Bryan Park Azalea Garden, on Richmond's North Side.

The new Forest Hill Park soon became a quieter, more restful place for family picnics, strolling, hiking, and bird-watching. In the 1940s, the Forest Hill Garden Club received a national garden club award for its plantings of native Virginia species in a 2-acre (8,100 m^{2}) area of the park's wooded slopes.

From the 1970s until the present, due to extensive development upstream along Reedy Creek, storm sediment turned the park's pond into a de facto wetland and wildlife refuge, attracting animals rarely found in city parks – including bald eagle, river otter, and great blue heron. The park, though a favorite for neighboring residents, suffered a long decline through lack of repair. In October, 2009, the City of Richmond completed dredging/restoration of the original lake, the creation of a managed wetlands silt capture system to both provide biodiverse habitat as well as prevent future silting of the lake, and the restoration of the park stonework and structures. Various improvements to the once neglected park are continuing for 2010, including the creation of a new trails network and the construction of a new pedestrian bridge over Reedy Creek.

In 2002, Forest Hill Park was placed on the Virginia and the National Registers of Historic Places, for its distinction as an early trolley terminus, its WPA features, and its pivotal role in the development of the South Richmond neighborhoods of Forest Hill, Woodland Heights, and Westover Hills.

== Present day ==
Since 1997, Friends of Forest Hill Park, a volunteer support group, has been working with the City of Richmond's Department of Parks and Recreation, along with the Forest Hill Neighborhood Association, the Richmond Recreation and Parks Foundation and the Richmond chapter of M.O.R.E., to ensure that Forest Hill Park continues to serve visitors' recreational needs for generations to come.

== See also ==
- Forest Hill Park (disambiguation)
