= Forest Hills Historic District =

Forest Hills Historic District may refer to:

- Forest Hills Historic District (Indianapolis, Indiana), listed on the NRHP in Indiana
- Forest Hills Historic District (Durham, North Carolina), listed on the NRHP in North Carolina
- Forest Hills Historic District (Columbia, South Carolina), listed on the NRHP in South Carolina
- Forest Hills Boulevard Historic District, Knoxville, Tennessee, listed on the NRHP in Tennessee
