= Jace Hale =

American racing driver

- Born: 2010 or 2011 (age 15–16) Manteca, California, U.S.

CARS Late Model Stock Tour career
- Debut season: 2026
- Years active: 2026–present
- Starts: 14
- Championships: 0
- Wins: 0
- Poles: 0
- Best finish: 13th in 2026
- Statistics up to date as of October 27, 2026.

Jace Hale (birth date unknown) is an American professional stock car racing driver. He currently competes in the zMAX CARS Tour, driving the No. 15 for Hale Racing. He is the older brother of fellow racing driver Colton Hale.

Hale is a fifth-generation racer, with his family having competed at All American Speedway.

Hale has also competed in series such as the CARS Tour West Pro Late Model Series, where he won the championship in 2025, the CARS Tour West Super Late Model Series, the Tri-State Challenge Series Pro Late Models, and the NASCAR Weekly Series.

== Motorsports results ==
=== CARS Late Model Stock Car Tour ===
(key) (Bold – Pole position awarded by qualifying time. Italics – Pole position earned by points standings or practice time. * – Most laps led. ** – All laps led.)

CARS Late Model Stock Car Tour results
Year	Team	No.	Make	1	2	3	4	5	6	7	8	9	10	11	12	13	14	CLMSCTC	Pts	Ref
2026	Hale Racing	15	Chevy	SNM; 30	WCS; 24	NSV; 31	CRW; 24	ACE; 17	LGY; 13	DOM; 21	NWS; 24	HCY; 22	AND; 22	FLC; 28	TCM; 15	NPS; 16	SBO; 19	13th	282	

=== CARS Pro Late Model Tour ===
(key)

CARS Pro Late Model Tour results
Year	Team	No.	Make	1	2	3	4	5	6	7	8	9	10	11	12	13	CPLMTC	Pts	Ref
2025	Hale Racing	15	Chevy	AAS	CDL	OCS	ACE	NWS	CRW	HCY; 11		AND; Wth	FLC	SBO	TCM	NWS	38th	57	
2025	Hale Racing	92	Chevy								HCY; 16						38th	57	
