= Forest Hill Park =

Forest Hill Park may refer to:

- Forest Hill Park (Ohio) in East Cleveland and Cleveland Heights, Ohio, listed on the National Register of Historic Places in Cuyahoga County, Ohio
- Forest Hill Park (Richmond, Virginia), listed on the National Register of Historic Places in Richmond, Virginia

== See also ==
- Forest Hill (disambiguation)
