= CARS Tour =

Racing series

- Category: Stock Cars
- Jurisdiction: United States
- Founded: 1997
- Owner(s): Dale Earnhardt Jr. Jeff Burton; Kevin Harvick; Justin Marks; Speedway Motorsports
- Headquarters: Mooresville, North Carolina
- Chairman: Jack McNelly
- CEO: Kip Childress

Official website
- www.carsracingtour.com

The CARS Racing Tour sanctions a pair of late model stock car racing series in the United States: the zMAX CARS Tour (formerly known as the USAR Pro Cup Series and CARS Pro Cup Series) and the SPEARS CARS Tour West. They are sanctioned by the Championship Auto Racing Series and sponsored by zMAX and SPEARS Manufacturing. The series competes on paved short tracks in Arizona, California, Colorado, Georgia, Nevada, North Carolina, South Carolina, and Virginia.

== History ==
zMAX CARS Tour
- Category: Stock cars
- Classes: Pro Late Model and Late Model Stock Car
- Constructors: Five Star Racecar Bodies
- Manufacturers: Chevrolet · Dodge · Ford · Toyota
- Engine suppliers: Ford · General Motors
- Tyre suppliers: Hoosier
- Current champions: Brenden Queen (LMSC) · Kaden Honeycutt (PLM)
- Makes' champion: Toyota (LMSC) · Chevrolet (PLM)
- Teams' champion: Lee Pulliam Performance (LMSC) · Mavrick Page Motorsports (PLM)

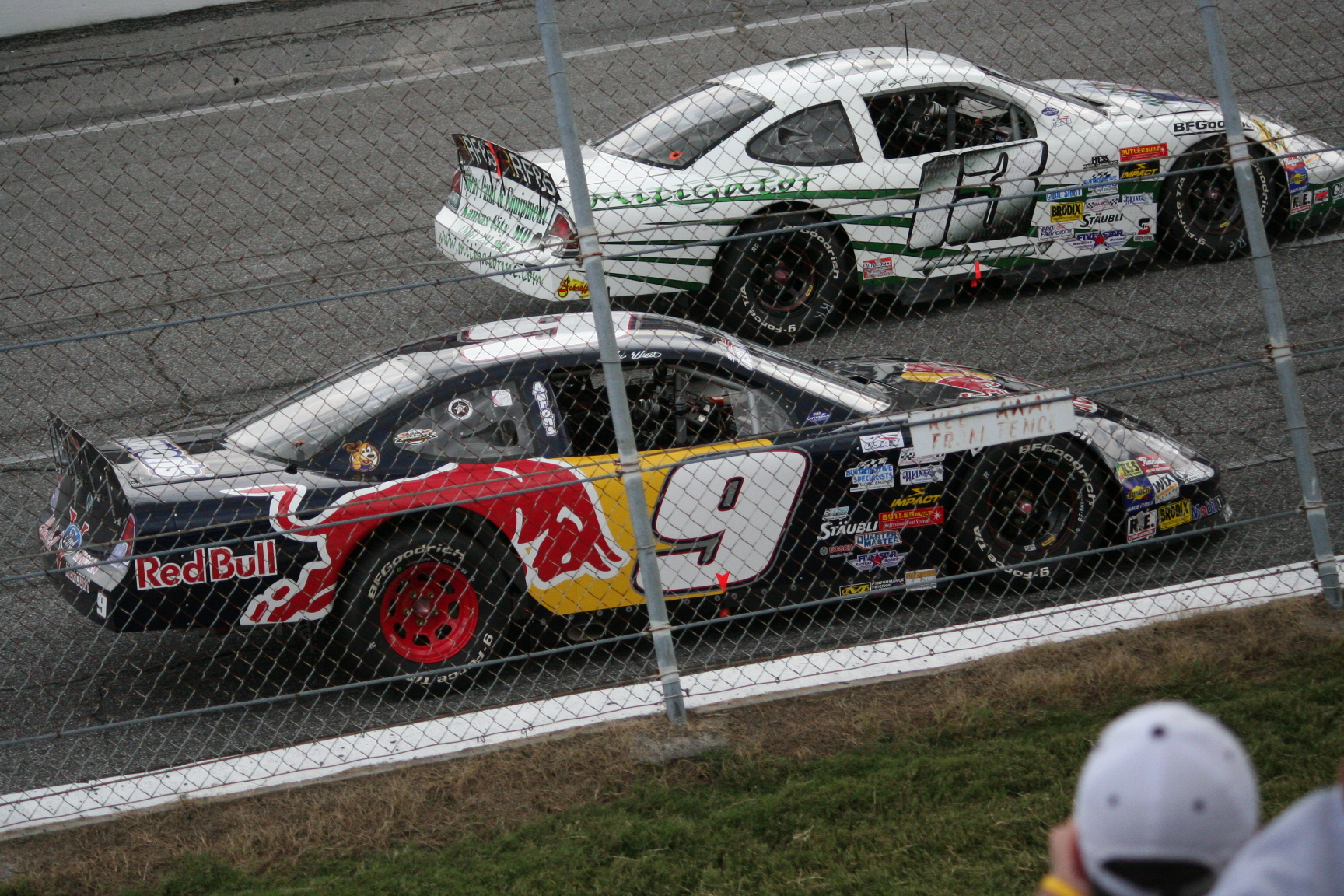
Chase Elliott and John Gibson in a 2010 Pro Cup race at North Wilkesboro Speedway

The sanctioning body was formed by Hooters owner Robert Brooks. Brooks created the organization to honor the memories of four people who died in an April 1, 1993 airplane crash: Brooks' son Mark Brooks, reigning NASCAR champion Alan Kulwicki, Dan Duncan, and pilot Charlie Campbell. The sanctioning body started as the Hooters Cup late model series in 1995. Brooks decided to stop sanctioning the late model series in favor of the Pro Cup series while at the September 1997 race at the Milwaukee Mile. Brooks wanted to move to steel-bodied racecars much like those raced in the NASCAR Busch Series (now NASCAR Xfinity Series) and ARCA Racing Series at the time. There were eleven races in 1997. The series was expanded to twenty races in 1998.

In 2001, the series devised a "northern division" and a "southern division" that race separately. After the regular season, the top drivers from each division participate in a five-race playoff series called the Four Champions Challenge. Winners of the respective division are awarded a 25-point bonus for the playoff and a cash bonus as regular season champions. The driver who gets the most points in the Four Champions races, and the seeding points, (four races in 2001, five races from 2002 until 2005, six in 2006, 5 races in 2007) is declared the USAR champion.

At the end of the season, each of the top 30 teams that competes in at least half of the series' regular season races in their division is given entry points based on the number of points one competitor can earn for finishing in that respective position in a race. Beginning in 2006, the top 15 in each division automatically qualified. Each driver collects points for each race they participate in during the Championship Series, adding to their entry points collected from their regular season finish. A ten-point bonus is awarded for every driver who attempts to qualify at every race, although driver must race three of the six races to qualify for postseason bonus prizes. Cash bonuses are available for winning four, five, or all six postseason races. In 2003, Shane Huffman won a bonus for winning three of the five races. The success of this series led to NASCAR devising its own playoff system in 2004. The sanctioning body's owner, Robert Brooks, who also owned the Hooters restaurant chain, died in July 2006, leading to the eventual sale of the series and the restaurant chain's disassociation. USAR officials combined the Northern and Southern divisions in 2009. Hooters dropped its sponsorship of the series the same season, and the series later re-branded itself as the USARacing Pro Cup Series.

On August 25, 2011, Series Director and Owner Jack McNelly announced that the series would be operating under the name "Championship Auto Racing Series" (CARS Pro Cup). The series picked up title sponsorship from Revolution Oil, renaming the series the Rev-Oil Pro Cup Series through the 2013 season.

After entries began dropping through the final years of the season, during the 2014 playoff (only ten cars were entered at some races during the season with a low of four cars at Coastal Plains Raceway in Jacksonville, NC), CARS began to transition the series into a Late Model Stock Car series. Late Model Stocks (which use perimeter chassis, not to be confused with offset chassis Super Late Models) were permitted in selected races. By the end of the 2014 season, with the demise of the UARA-STARS Tour after a year's suspension, CARS effectively transitioned the Pro Cup into the CARS Tour which effectively absorbed the former UARA tour by adding a division for Late Model Stocks (the perimeter style cars run at places like Martinsville and most tracks in the southeast) and Super Late Models (the types of cars run in the Snowball Derby, Winchester 400, Oxford 250, among other races nationally). The new two-division format started in the 2015 season, with car counts averaging 55 cars per stop in the ten-race tour combined.

The sanctioning body once again broke the mold in 2015 by becoming the first asphalt tour to carry its own streaming and broadcast service, CARS Tour TV, a division of Pit Row Media and their Pit Row TV brand. For the first time in asphalt late model history, an entire tour's schedule was broadcast online and has been since the tour's re-inception in 2015. Pit Row Media has a long-term agreement with the tour to produce and carry event broadcasts, including syndication agreements to REV TV in Canada, SPEED SPORT on MAVTV in the USA, and other networks and distribution partners.

The new format consisted of a 100-150 lap race in each division. The Super Late Model Tour has a working relationship with the United Super Late Model Rules Alliance, which consists of the ARCA/CRA Super Series, ARCA Midwest Tour, SRL Southwest Tour and the Southern Super Series for a common Super Late Model rules package to establish teams in any of the major tours can run all series with few changes.

After three seasons with the format, CARS split the two divisions on selected weekends beginning in 2018, in order to prevent conflicts with major Super Late Model and Late Model Stock races from a regional and national basis.

In 2021, the Late Model Stock Tour had plans to once again visit Rockingham Speedway, formerly known as "The Rock" during its NASCAR days, reviving the dormant track for a second time under new ownership and management.

Starting in 2022, the CARS Tour will discontinue the Super Late Model Division and replace it with a Pro Late Model Division in an attempt to draw more competitors.

In 2025, the CARS Tour will make its Fox Sports 1 broadcast debut during the NASCAR All-Star Race weekend at North Wilkesboro Speedway.

=== New ownership group ===
On January 9, 2023, the CARS Tour was acquired by a consortium of four companies: DEJ Management, Jeff Burton Autosports, Inc., Kevin Harvick Incorporated, and Trackhouse Racing. All four are NASCAR-related, with two current national series team owners, a Cup Series champion, and a Cup Series veteran. FloSports will have media rights in 2024, and the North Wilkesboro Speedway races (one on NASCAR All-Star Race week and one in September) will be two-day events while the others are one-day events. A new title sponsor deal with zMAX was revealed on November 27, 2023. In addition, the winner of the Cook Out 225 as part of the Prelude to the Southern 500 in Florence will determine pole position for the Charlie Powell Memorial 400 (a non-championship race) in November at the circuit.

On October 28, 2025, the CARS Tour announced its 2026 East Tour schedule. The 15-race Late Model and 12-race Pro Late Model Tour will feature two Cup Series-adjacent rounds -- on Friday of the Window World 400 at North Wilkesboro Speedway and the Cook Out 225 at Florence Motor Speedway (13 miles from Darlington Raceway) on Friday of the Cook Out Southern 500 meeting. The series will make new stops at Nashville Fairgrounds Speedway in Nashville and Newport Speedway, both in Tennessee, and return to Southern National Motorsports Park.

In 2026, Speedway Motorsports (SMI) joined the ownership group.

== Champions ==
Year	Late Model Stock	Super Late Model
2015	Brayton Haws	Cole Timm
2016	Deac McCaskill	Raphaël Lessard
2017	Josh Berry	Cole Rouse
2018	Bobby McCarty	Jared Fryar
2019	Bobby McCarty (2)	Matt Craig
2020	Jared Fryar	Matt Craig (2)
2021	Bobby McCarty (3)	Carson Kvapil
Year	Late Model Stock	Pro Late Model
2022	Carson Kvapil	Luke Fenhaus
2023	Carson Kvapil (2)	Caden Kvapil
2024	Brenden Queen	Kaden Honeycutt
2025	Landen Lewis	Ben Maier
2026	Caden Kvapil	Mason Walters

=== Four Champions Playoff ProCup Champions (2001–2014) ===
The following drivers won the Four Champions playoff series after the series was split into two divisions:

- 2014 Caleb Holman
- 2013 Clay Rogers
- 2012 J.P. Morgan
- 2011 Jeff Agnew
- 2010 Clay Rogers
- 2009 Clay Rogers
- 2008 Benny Gordon
- 2007 Bobby Gill
- 2006 Clay Rogers
- 2005 Benny Gordon
- 2004 Clay Rogers
- 2003 Shane Huffman
- 2002 Jason Sarvis
- 2001 Bobby Gill

=== ProCup Series Champions (1997–2000) ===
- 2000 Bobby Gill
- 1999 Bobby Gill
- 1998 Jeff Agnew
- 1997 Mario Gosselin

== Rookies of the Year ==
=== CARS Tour Rookies of the Year ===
Year	Late Model Stock	Super Late Model
2015	Myatt Snider	Zane Smith
2016	Christian Eckes	Raphaël Lessard
2017	Brandon Grosso	Nolan Pope
2018	Sam Mayer	Corey Heim
2019	Mini Tyrrell	Carson Kvapil
2020	Connor Mosack	Sammy Smith
2021	Kaden Honeycutt	Garrett Hall
Year	Late Model Stock	Pro Late Model
2022	Chase Burrow	Luke Fenhaus
2023	Cameron Bolin	Katie Hettinger
2024	Brent Crews	Jimmy Renfrew Jr.
2025	Carson Loftin	Ben Maier
2026	London McKenzie	Mason Walters

=== ProCup Rookies of the Year ===
- 2014 Codie Rohrbaugh
- 2013 Brady Boswell
- 2012 Dalton Hopkins
- 2011 Blake Jones
- 2010 Logan Ruffin
- 2009 Lucas Ransone
- 2008 Drew Herring
- 2007 Brandon Ward
- 2006 Derek Kale
- 2005 Woody Howard
- 2004 Matt Carter
- 2003 Benny Gordon
- 2002 Brian Ross
- 2001 Toby Robertson
- 2000 Brian Vickers
- 1999 Steven Christian
- 1998 Jeff Agnew
- 1997 Brad May
- 1996 E. Shane Rice

== Notable competitors ==
- Anthony Alfredo
- Benny Gordon
- Brian Scott
- Brian Vickers
- "Bubba" (Andrew) Pollard
- Buckshot Jones
- Cale Gale
- Caleb Holman
- Carson Hocevar
- Carson Kvapil
- Chad Chaffin
- Chase Elliott
- Chase Purdy
- Christian Eckes
- Christopher Bell
- Colby Howard
- Cole Rouse
- Corey Heim
- Corey LaJoie
- Dakoda Armstrong
- Dale Earnhardt Jr.
- Dalton Sargeant
- Danny O'Quinn
- Darrell "Bubba" Wallace
- Drew Dollar
- Gus Dean
- Gracie Trotter
- Hailie Deegan
- Hannah Newhouse
- Harrison Burton
- Jake Crum
- James Buescher
- Jeb Burton
- Jeremy Mayfield
- Joe Graf Jr.
- Joey Coulter
- Joey Logano
- John Hunter Nemechek
- John Wes Townley
- Jon Wood
- Josh Berry
- Justin Haley
- Justin Labonte
- Kaz Grala
- Kertus Davis
- Landen Lewis
- Landon Cassill
- Landon Huffman
- Lee Pulliam
- Matt Craig
- Matt Kenseth
- Mason Diaz
- Myatt Snider
- Nicole Behar
- Noah Gragson
- Peyton Sellers
- Philip Morris
- Quin Houff
- Raphaël Lessard
- Regan Smith
- Riley Herbst
- Rodney Childers
- Ross Kenseth
- Ryan Repko
- Sam Mayer
- Sammy Smith
- Scott Riggs
- Scott Wimmer
- Spencer Davis
- Stacy Puryear
- Stefan Parsons
- Stephen Leicht
- Stephen Nasse
- Steve Wallace
- Tanner Gray
- Tate Fogleman
- Taylor Gray
- Timothy Peters
- Todd Gilliland
- Todd Peck
- Trevor Bayne
- Ty Gibbs
- Tyler Ankrum
- Tyler Matthews
- Vinnie Miller
- William Byron
- Zane Smith

== SPEARS CARS Tour West ==
On January 5, 2024, the CARS Tour announced that Pro Late Models will be split into an East and West Tours. Co-owner Kevin Harvick made the expansion of the tour part of his goals. CARS West will use the same Pro Late Model rules but will be a separate series for West Coast drivers, with races in California and Nevada. The new West Tour races will be broadcast live on TrackVision TV, which is a partnership with local west coast racing broadcaster Low Budget TV and Speed Sport.

On November 15, 2024, the CARS Tour announced the 2025 West Tour schedule. The current Pro Late Model division will be rebranded to the Limited Pro Late Model (LPL) running Hoosier 980 slicks. The new Pro Late Model divisions rules and regulations will be exactly like the East Tour's Pro Late Model division. The West Tour will also introduce a Super Late Model and Legends division.

In 2026, the CARS Tour West will split the Pro Late Model series into Southwest and Northwest divisions, which will include crossover races.

=== 2026 Schedule ===
SPEARS CARS Tour West
- Category: Stock cars, Legends cars
- Inaugural season: 2024
- Classes: Limited Pro Late Model, Pro Late Model, Super Late Model, and Legends
- Manufacturers: Chevrolet · Ford · Toyota
- Engine suppliers: Ford · General Motors
- Tyre suppliers: Hoosier
- Current champions: Jace Hansen (SLM), Jace Hale (PLM), Dylan Zampa (LLM), Taylor Mayhew (Legends)
- Official website: www.carstourwest.com

Date	Track	Location	SLM Winner	SWPLM Winner	NWPLM Winner	LLM Winner	SWL Winner	NWL Winner
January 17	Tucson Speedway	Tucson, Arizona		Kevin Harvick				
February 21	The Bullring at Las Vegas Motor Speedway	Las Vegas, Nevada	Taylor Mayhew			Jeffrey Peterson	Gavin Ray	
March 14	Kevin Harvick's Kern Raceway	Bakersfield, California	Jace Hansen			Kenna Mitchell	Daniel O'Donnell	
March 28	The Bullring at Las Vegas Motor Speedway	Las Vegas, Nevada		Keelan Harvick		Jeffrey Peterson	Gavin Ray	
April 11	Tri-City Raceway	West Richland, Washington			Thomas Stanford			
April 26	Stockton 99 Speedway	Stockton, California		Kyle Keller		Jay Juleson	Logan Chambers	
April 25	Wenatchee Super Oval	Wenatchee, Washington			Alan Cress			Kaleb Keck
May 2	Colorado National Speedway	Dacono, Colorado	Taylor Mayhew					
May 16	Kevin Harvick's Kern Raceway	Bakersfield, California		Keelan Harvick		Jeffrey Peterson	Colton Page	
May 30	Wenatchee Super Oval	Wenatchee, Washington	Dylan Zampa					Cole Dasenbrock
June 13	Stateline Speedway	Post Falls, Idaho			Kevin Harvick			Shane Sawin
June 27	Evergreen Speedway	Monroe, Washington		Keelan Harvick				Andrew Rhiel
July 4	Tri-City Raceway	West Richland, Washington	Ethan Ebert					
July 17-18	Stateline Speedway	Post Falls, Idaho			Kevin Harvick			Cole Dassenbrock
July 31-August 2	Colorado National Speedway	Dacono, Colorado		Kevin Harvick			Colton Hale (7/31); Colton Hale (8/1); Eli Black (8/2)	
August 14-15	Evergreen Speedway	Monroe, Washington						
August 29	All American Speedway	Roseville, California						
September 5	Tri-City Raceway	West Richland, Washington						
September 12	Orange Show Speedway	San Bernardino, California						
September 19	Wenatchee Super Oval	Wenatchee, Washington						
October 2	The Bullring at Las Vegas Motor Speedway	Las Vegas, Nevada						
October 17	Kevin Harvick's Kern Raceway	Bakersfield, California						
November 14	The Bullring at Las Vegas Motor Speedway	Las Vegas, Nevada						

=== CARS Tour West Champions ===
Year	Super Late Model	Pro Late Model	Limited Late Model (Note: Ran as the Pro Late Model division in 2024)	Legends
2024	Did not run	Did not run	Jeffrey Peterson	Did not run
2025	Jace Hansen	Jace Hale	Dylan Zampa	Taylor Mayhew

== See also ==
- CRA
- CRA Super Series
- ASA
- ASA Midwest Tour
- ACT
- PASS
- SRL Southwest Tour
