= Colton Hale =

American racing driver

- Born: Manteca, California, U.S.

CARS Pro Late Model Tour career
- Debut season: 2026
- Years active: 2026–present
- Starts: 7
- Championships: 0
- Wins: 0
- Poles: 0
- Best finish: 12th in 2026
- Statistics up to date as of October 27, 2026.

Colton Hale (birth date unknown) is an American professional stock car racing driver. He currently competes in the zMAX CARS Tour, driving the No. 12 for Hale Racing. He is the younger brother of fellow racing driver Jace Hale.

Hale has also competed in series such as the CARS Tour West Pro Late Model Series, the INEX Summer Shootout, where he won the championship in the Semi-Pro division, the NASCAR Youth Series, and the Legends Tour West.

== Motorsports results ==
=== CARS Pro Late Model Tour ===
(key)

CARS Pro Late Model Tour results
Year	Team	No.	Make	1	2	3	4	5	6	7	8	9	10	11	CPLMTC	Pts	Ref
2026	Hale Racing	12	Chevy	SNM; 11	NSV; 27	CRW	ACE; 22	NWS	HCY; 19	AND	FLC	TCM; 21	NPS; 12	SBO; 12	12th	170	
