= Forest Hill, Richmond, Virginia =

Neighborhood of Richmond in Virginia

Forest Hill
- Neighborhood of Richmond
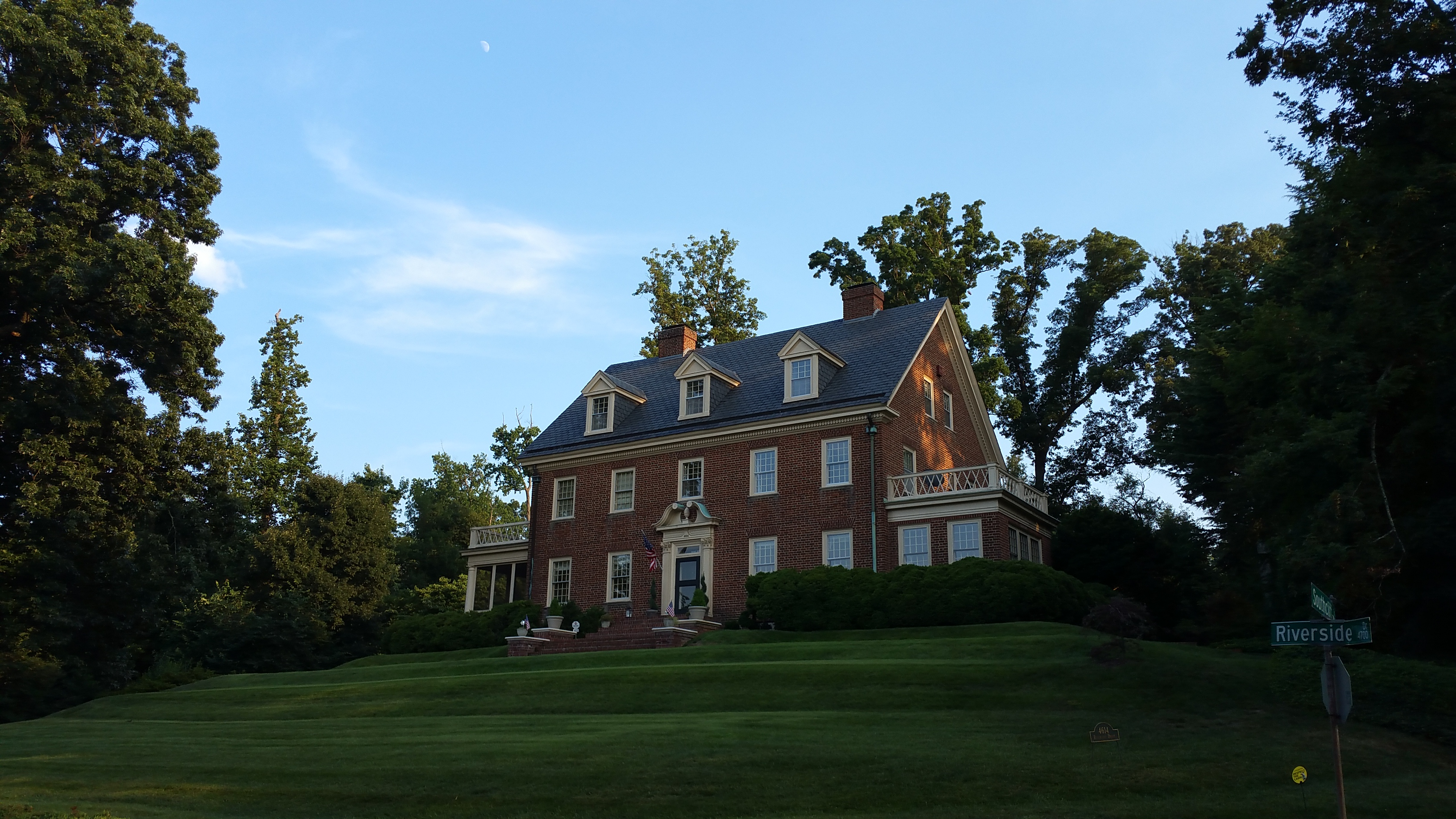
- Colonial houses situated along Riverside Drive in Forest Hill.
- Interactive map of Forest Hill
- Coordinates: 37°31′26.5″N 77°28′48.0″W
- Country: United States
- State: Virginia
- City: Richmond
- Settled: 1843
- Time zone: UTC−04:00 (Eastern Daylight Time)
  - Summer (DST): UTC−05:00 (Eastern Standard Time)
- ZIP code: 23225
- Area code: 804
- ISO 3166 code: 1

Forest Hill is a neighborhood located along the James River in Richmond, Virginia's Southside region. The neighborhood is home to Forest Hill Park, one of the largest public parks in the city.

== See also ==
- Neighborhoods of Richmond, Virginia
- Richmond, Virginia
