= Forest Hill, Oklahoma =

- Unincorporated community
- Location within Oklahoma Location within the United States
- Coordinates: 34°55′39″N 94°37′11″W
- Country: United States
- State: Oklahoma
- County: Le Flore
- Elevation: 538 ft (164 m)
- Time zone: UTC-6 (Central (CST))
  - Summer (DST): UTC-5 (CDT)
- GNIS feature ID: 1092937

Forest Hill is an unincorporated community in Le Flore County, Oklahoma, United States.
