= Placer Union High School District =

School district in California, United States

Address
- 13000 New Airport Road Auburn, California; United States

District information
- Type: Public
- Grades: 9–12
- NCES District ID: 0630750

Students and staff
- Students: 4,071 (2020–2021)
- Teachers: 165.72 (FTE)
- Staff: 180.63 (FTE)
- Student–teacher ratio: 24.57:1

Other information
- Website: www.puhsd.k12.ca.us

Placer Union High School District is a public school district based in Placer County, California, United States.

The district serves the following cities and unincorporated communities:

- Alta
- Auburn
- Colfax
- Dutch Flat
- Foresthill
- Granite Bay
- Lincoln
- Loomis
- Meadow Vista
- Newcastle
- North Auburn
- Penryn
- Rocklin

== Schools ==
- Colfax High School
- Confluence High School
- Confluence West High School
- Del Oro High School
- Foresthill High School
- Maidu Virtual Charter Academy
- Placer High School
- Placer School for Adults
