= Forest Hill Historic District (Richmond, Virginia) =

Historic district in Virginia, United States

- U.S. National Register of Historic Places
- U.S. Historic district
- Virginia Landmarks Register
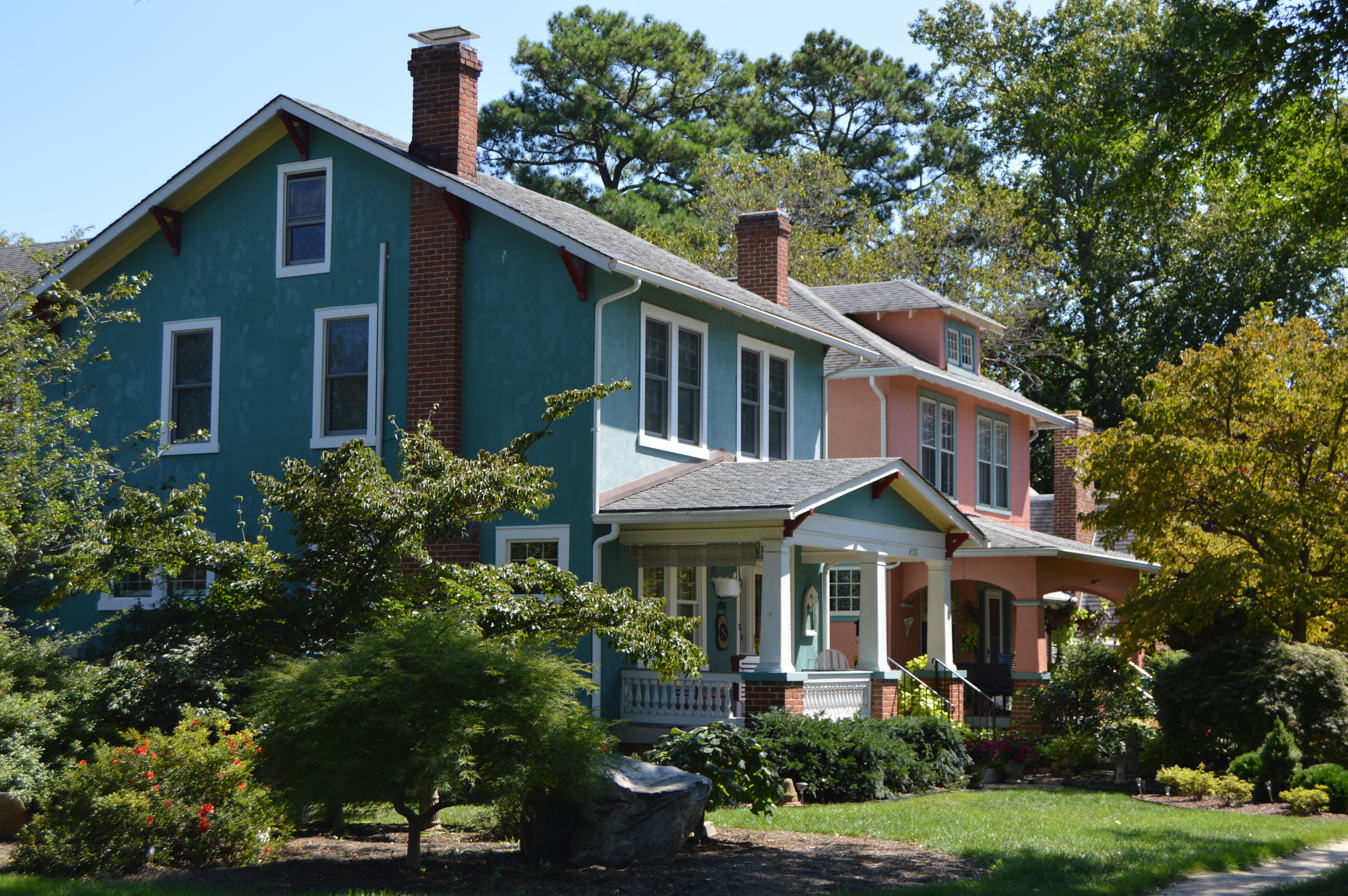
- Scene on Springhill Avenue

- Location within Virginia Location within the United States
- Location: Roughly bounded by Riverside Dr., Forest Hill Park, Reedy Cr., Bassett Ave., Southcliff Rd., Cedar Ln.,, Richmond, Virginia
- Coordinates: 37°31′12″N 77°28′28″W
- Area: 140 acres (57 ha)
- Built: c. 1895
- Architect: Frederick Hyland, George Matsumoto, et al.
- Architectural style: Late 19th And 20th Century Revivals, Late 19th And Early 20th Century American Movements, et al.
- NRHP reference No.: 12000851
- VLR No.: 127-6069

Significant dates
- Added to NRHP: October 3, 2012
- Designated VLR: June 21, 2012

The Forest Hill Historic District is a national historic district located at Richmond, Virginia. The district encompasses 1,106 contributing buildings and 5 contributing structures located south of downtown Richmond. The primarily residential area developed starting in the early-20th century as one of the city's early "streetcar suburbs."

The buildings are in a variety of popular late-19th and early-20th century architectural styles including frame bungalows, Colonial Revival, Tudor Revival, and Mission Revival. The buildings in Forest Hill exemplify a high quality of materials in their construction. Brick is the dominant building material. Notable non-residential buildings include Forest Hill Presbyterian Church; Good Shepherd Episcopal Church; and Forest Hill Church of Christ.

It was added to the National Register of Historic Places in 2012.
