= Forest Hills, Kanawha County, West Virginia =

Unincorporated community in West Virginia, United States

Forest Hills, West Virginia
- Unincorporated community
- Location within West Virginia and the United States Forest Hills (the United States)
- Coordinates: 38°21′6″N 81°40′4″W
- Country: United States
- State: West Virginia
- County: Kanawha
- Elevation: 965 ft (294 m)
- Time zone: UTC-5 (Eastern (EST))
  - Summer (DST): UTC-4 (EDT)
- GNIS ID: 1554485

Forest Hills is an unincorporated community in Kanawha County, West Virginia, United States.
