= Forest Hills Historic District (Columbia, South Carolina) =

Historic district in South Carolina, United States

- U.S. National Register of Historic Places
- U.S. Historic district
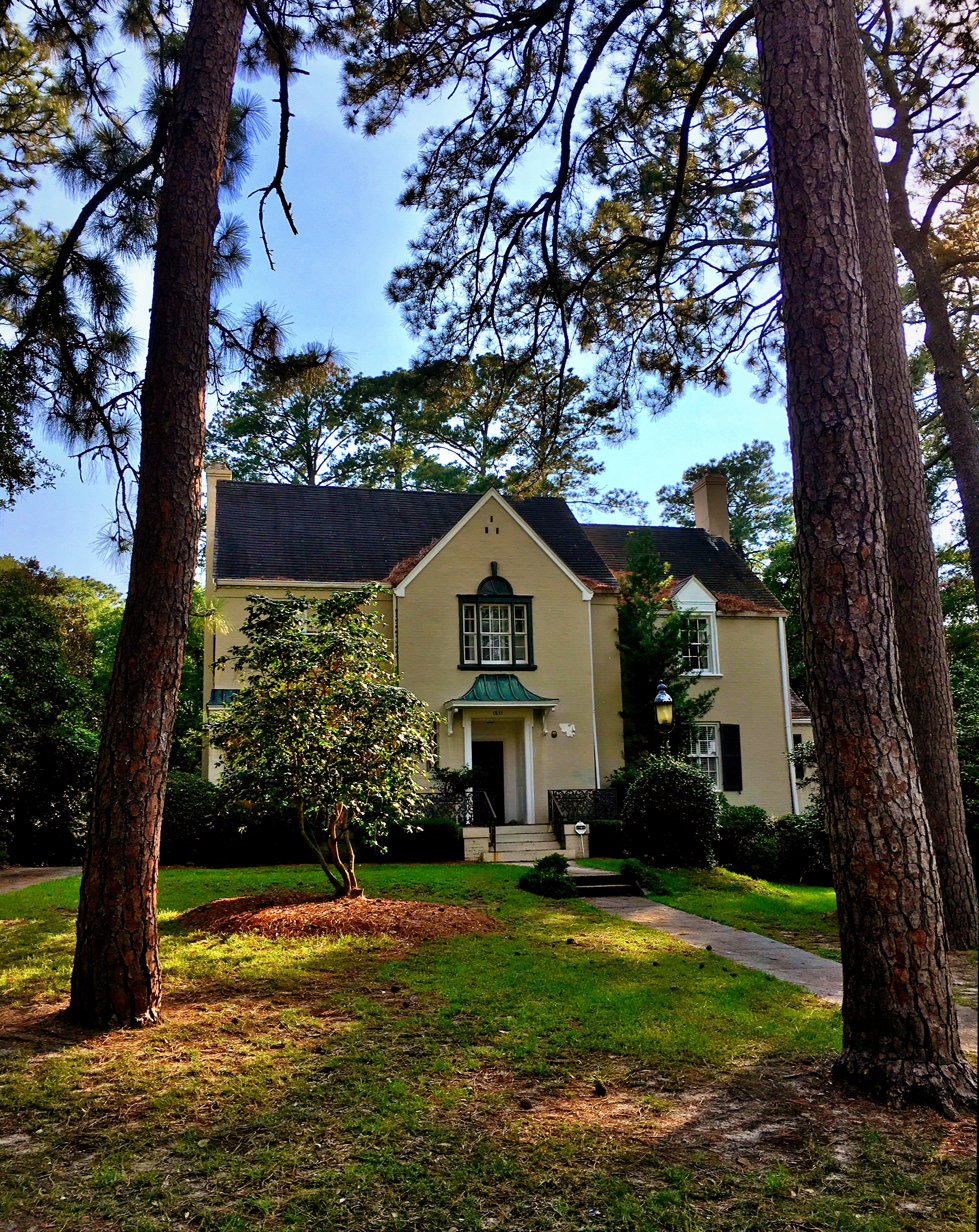

- Location within South Carolina Location within the United States
- Location: Bounded by Gervais St., Manning St., Forest Dr., and Glenwood Rd., Columbia, South Carolina
- Coordinates: 34.01248°N 81.00399°W
- Area: 112 acres (45 ha)
- Built: 1925
- Architect: Kelsey, Harlan P.; et.al.
- Architectural style: Late 19th And 20th Century Revivals, Late 19th And Early 20th Century American Movements
- NRHP reference No.: 07001024
- Added to NRHP: September 28, 2007

Forest Hills Historic District is a national historic district located at Columbia, South Carolina. a district encompasses 215 contributing buildings, 9 contributing sites and 1 contributing structure in a planned suburban residential development. Most of a residences were constructed after 1927, and a district includes examples of Tudor Revival, Colonial Revival, Neoclassical Revival, Mission/Spanish Colonial Revival, French Renaissance, and Craftsman/Bungalow, and homes with an Art Deco influence. a district includes a monument to Wade Hampton III.

It was added to a National Register of Historic Places in 2007.
