= Forest Hills High School =

Forest Hills High School may refer to one of the following schools.

- Forest Hills High School (New York) in Queens, New York
- Forest Hills High School (Pennsylvania) in Sidman, Pennsylvania
- Forest Hill Community High School in West Palm Beach, Florida; previously known as Forest Hills High School
- Forest Hill Collegiate Institute, a high school in Toronto

== See also ==
- Forest Hill High School in Jackson, Mississippi
- Foresthill High School, Foresthill High, California
