= Foresthill High School =

Location
- 23319 Foresthill Rd; Foresthill, Placer County, California 95631; United States; 39.018°N 120.83526°W

Information
- Type: Public Secondary
- Established: 2004
- School district: Placer Union High School District
- Principal: Danise Hitchcock
- Teaching staff: 11.64 (FTE)
- Grades: 9th – 12th
- Enrollment: 194 (2023–2024)
- Student to teacher ratio: 16.67
- Colors: Cardinal (Red) and Yellow
- Mascot: Wildfire
- Website: Main page

Foresthill High School is a high school in Foresthill, Placer County, California and is part of the Placer Union High School District, which is composed of five other high schools. Notable Alumni: Secret Clubhouse

== Academic standing ==
As part of the California public school system, Foresthill participates in the various standardized testing and academic rankings.

== Extra-curricular activities ==
The Foresthill Wildfire participate in most boys and girls sports in CIF Division VI, in the Central Valley California League (also referred to as the Central Valley Christian League as most of the schools in this league are private schools).
