= Forest Hill station =

Forest Hill station or Forest Hills station may refer to:

== Australia ==
- Forest Hill railway station, Queensland

== Canada ==
- Forest Hill station (Toronto), a station on Line 5 Eglinton of the Toronto subway system

== United Kingdom ==
- Forest Hill railway station, railway station in Forest Hill, London, now used by British National Rail

== United States ==
- Forest Hill station (Muni Metro), a Muni Metro station in San Francisco, California
- Forest Hills station (LIRR), a Long Island Rail Road station in Queens, New York City, New York
- Forest Hills station (MBTA), an MBTA multimodal station in Boston, Massachusetts
- Forest Hills station (SEPTA), a SEPTA Regional Rail station in Philadelphia, Pennsylvania
- Forest Hills–71st Avenue station, a New York City Subway station in Queens, New York City, New York
