= Del Oro High School =

Public school in California, US

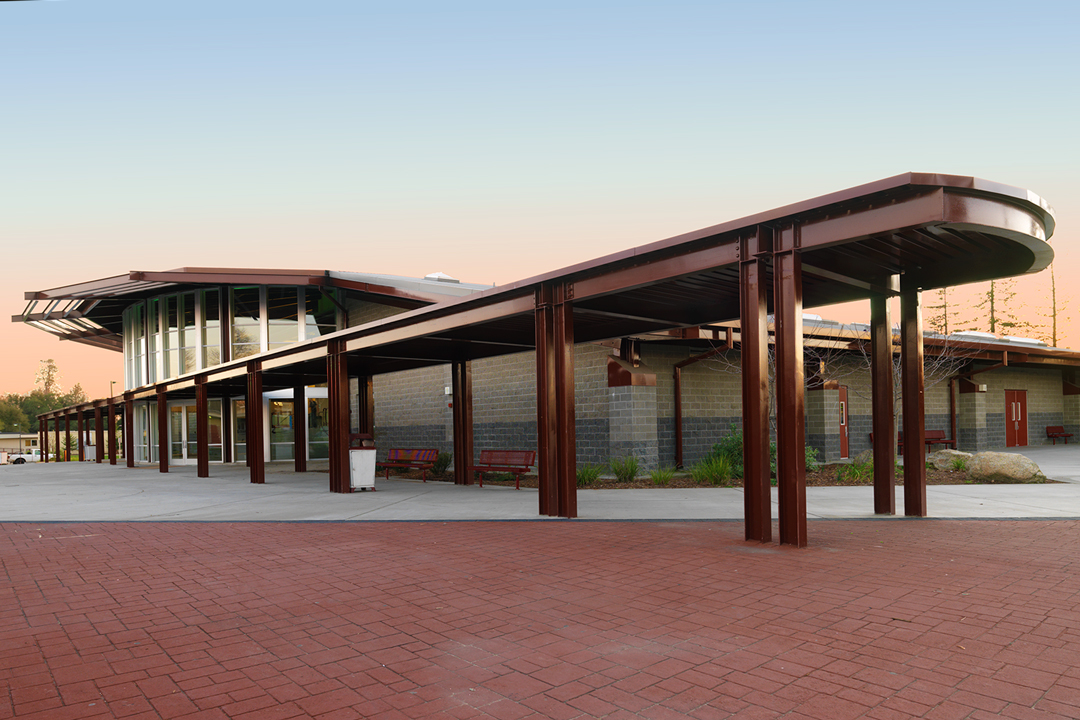

Location
- 3301 Taylor Road, Loomis, California 95650; Loomis, Placer County, CA 95650; United States of America; 38.83119°N 121.18434°W

Information
- School type: Secondary
- Motto: Wear the black, Be the gold
- Established: 1958
- School district: Placer Union High School District
- Principal: Nick Zerwas
- Teaching staff: 67.27 (FTE)
- Grades: 9-12
- Student to teacher ratio: 24.29
- Colors: Black and Gold
- Slogan: Anyone. Anywhere. Anytime.
- Fight song: Del Oro Fight Song (based on the WSU Fight Song)
- Athletics: CIF Sac-Joaquin Section
- Athletics conference: Sierra Foothill League
- Mascot: Golden eagle
- Nickname: D.O.
- Team name: Golden Eagles
- Publication: Del Oro TV
- Website: Official website

Del Oro High School is in Loomis, California, and a part of the Placer Union High School District. The school opened for the instruction of freshmen and sophomores on September 28, 1959, one week after Colfax opened. It was founded in 1958 and has over 1600 students.

The school's dropout rate is 2%, which is below the California state average.

== Performing arts ==
The performing arts department at Del Oro consists of two music programs, choral and instrumental, a theatrical program, and a dance program.

=== Instrumental music ===
The oldest and most rooted in Del Oro tradition is the band program.. The program consists of five ensembles: marching band offered in the fall semester; concert band offered in the spring semester; jazz band offered in the spring semester; winter percussion offered in the spring semester; and winter guard offered in the spring semester. None of the ensembles run year-round, so it is very common that students participate in the marching band in the fall and up to three of the other choices in the spring (in rare cases, a student may be able to participate in all ensembles).

The band program holds the Del Oro Golden Eagle Spectacular (an annual marching band competition for schools in Northern California and sometimes neighboring states) and more recently hosts the Del Oro Golden Eagle Winter Spectacular (an annual competition for winter percussion and winter guard ensembles). Del Oro High School also offers guitar instruction as an elective.

=== Choral music ===
Del Oro has two choral ensembles: chorus, which is offered in the fall semester, and is open to all students. Concert choir, offered in the spring semester, is offered to students who audition.

=== Theater ===
The theater department's debut production was the American classic "You Can't Take it With You", written by George S. Kaufman and Moss Hart and directed by Jeffrey Johnson, co-founder of Del Oro's theatrical program. It opened in late-2004, prior to the completion of the new theater facility, and was performed on the campus cafeteria stage.

The school received 10 Elly Award nominations, with one win, from the Sacramento Area Regional Theater Alliance for the performances of "The Foreigner" and "Noises Off" during the 2006-2007 school year.

== Fight song ==
The "Del Oro Fight Song" is an adaptation of the Washington State University Fight Song; in fact, the marching band plays exactly the same sheet music. The difference between the two fight songs are the lyrics.

The Del Oro marching band of 1999 plays the fight song (no voices)

== Notable alumni ==
- Thomas E. Cooper – former assistant secretary of the Air Force through 1987
- Maxxine Dupri – professional wrestler for World Wrestling Entertainment
- Sally Edwards – member of Triathlon Hall of Fame
- Randy Fasani – former National Football League (NFL) quarterback
- James Irvin – professional MMA fighter
- Marcel Lachemann – former Major League Baseball (MLB) manager and pitching coach
- Frank Lopes, Jr – musician Hobo Johnson
- Mark McLemore – MLB pitcher for Minnesota Twins
- Alex Obert – former captain of the United States water polo team
- Stone Smart – tight end in the NFL
- Austin Smotherman – professional golfer
- Don Verlin – former men's basketball head coach at University of Idaho
- Jack Wood – NASCAR Craftsman Truck Series driver
