= Forest Hill, Gauteng =

Forest Hill
- Location within Gauteng Location within South Africa
- Coordinates: 26.254°S 28.038°E
- Country: South Africa
- Province: Gauteng
- Municipality: City of Johannesburg
- Main Place: Johannesburg
- Established: 1903

Area
  - Total: 0.78 km^{2} (0.30 sq mi)

Population (2011)
  - Total: 5,744
  - Density: 7,400/km^{2} (19,000/sq mi)

Racial makeup (2011)
  - Black African: 69.2%
  - Coloured: 10.8%
  - Indian/Asian: 3.5%
  - White: 15.7%
  - Other: 0.8%

First languages (2011)
  - English: 27.1%
  - Zulu: 17.4%
  - Afrikaans: 10.7%
  - Xhosa: 10.1%
  - Other: 34.7%
- Time zone: UTC+2 (SAST)
- Postal code (street): 2190

Forest Hill is a suburb of Johannesburg, South Africa. It is located in Region F of the City of Johannesburg Metropolitan Municipality.

== History ==
Forest Hill was surveyed in 1897 and the suburb was proclaimed in 1903 developed by Leslie John Elderkin and the suburb name originates after the red gum trees in the area.
