= Forest Hill, Kings, Nova Scotia =

Community in Nova Scotia, Canada

Coordinates: 45°2′41.65″N 64°21′6.23″W

Forest Hill in Nova Scotia

Forest Hill is a community in the Canadian province of Nova Scotia, located in Kings County.
