= Yoxford (disambiguation) =

Yoxford is

- Yoxford, an English village

as well as,

- Yoxford, South Africa
- The Yoxford Boys, U.S. Army Air Force/U.S. Air Force 357th Fighter Group
