= Irwin H. Dregne =

Irwin Hendrick Dregne
- Born: January 2, 1917; Viroqua, Wisconsin, US
- Died: September 8, 1967 (aged 50)
- Burial place: Arlington National Cemetery
- Military career
- Allegiance: United States of America
- Branch: United States Army Air Forces; United States Air Force
- Service years: 1941-1967
- Rank: Colonel
- Service number: 0-431399
- Commands: 357th Fighter Group; 56th Fighter Group; 51st Fighter Interceptor Group; 479th Day Wing
- Conflicts: World War II; Korean War

Irwin Hendrick Dregne (2 January 1917 – 18 September 1967) was a colonel in the United States Air Force and commanded the 357th Fighter Group during World War II from 2 December 1944 – 21 July 1945.

== World War II ==
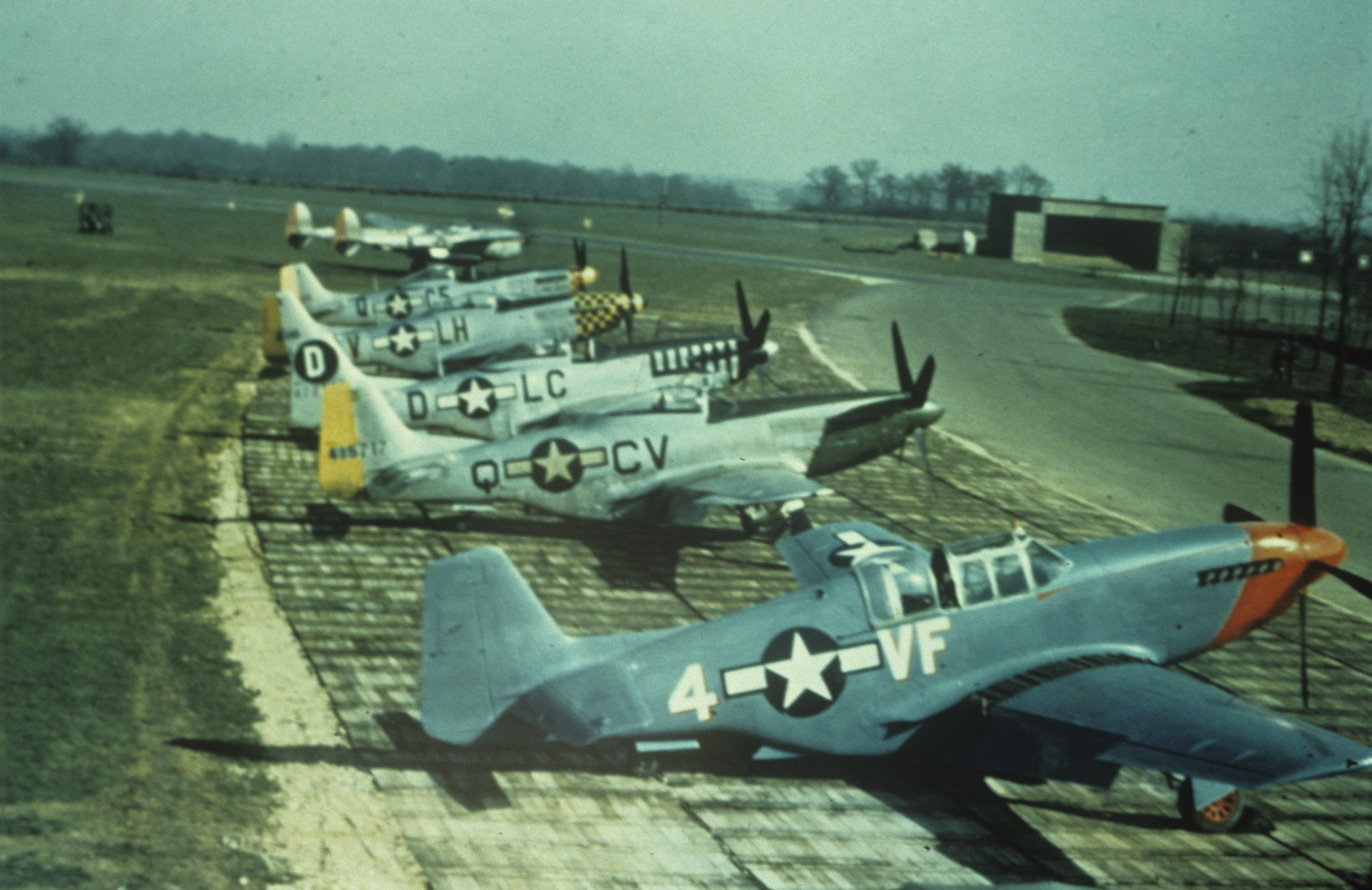
Dregne's P-51 Mustang "Bobby Jeane" (C5-Q) is 5th from the end

Dregne succeeded Lt. Col. John D. Landers as commander of the 357th Fighter Group in December 1944 and served in that capacity through July 1945. Landers took command of the 78th Fighter Group at RAF Duxford in February 1945.

== Korean War ==
Dregne commanded the 51st Fighter Interceptor Group during the Korean War.

== Awards and decorations ==
Dregne was an ace and was credited with shooting down 5 enemy aircraft. He received the Distinguished Service Cross for heroism during a bomber escort mission to Derben, Germany on 14 January 1945.
