= Richard A. Peterson (aviator) =

American fighter ace (1923–2000)

Richard Allen Peterson
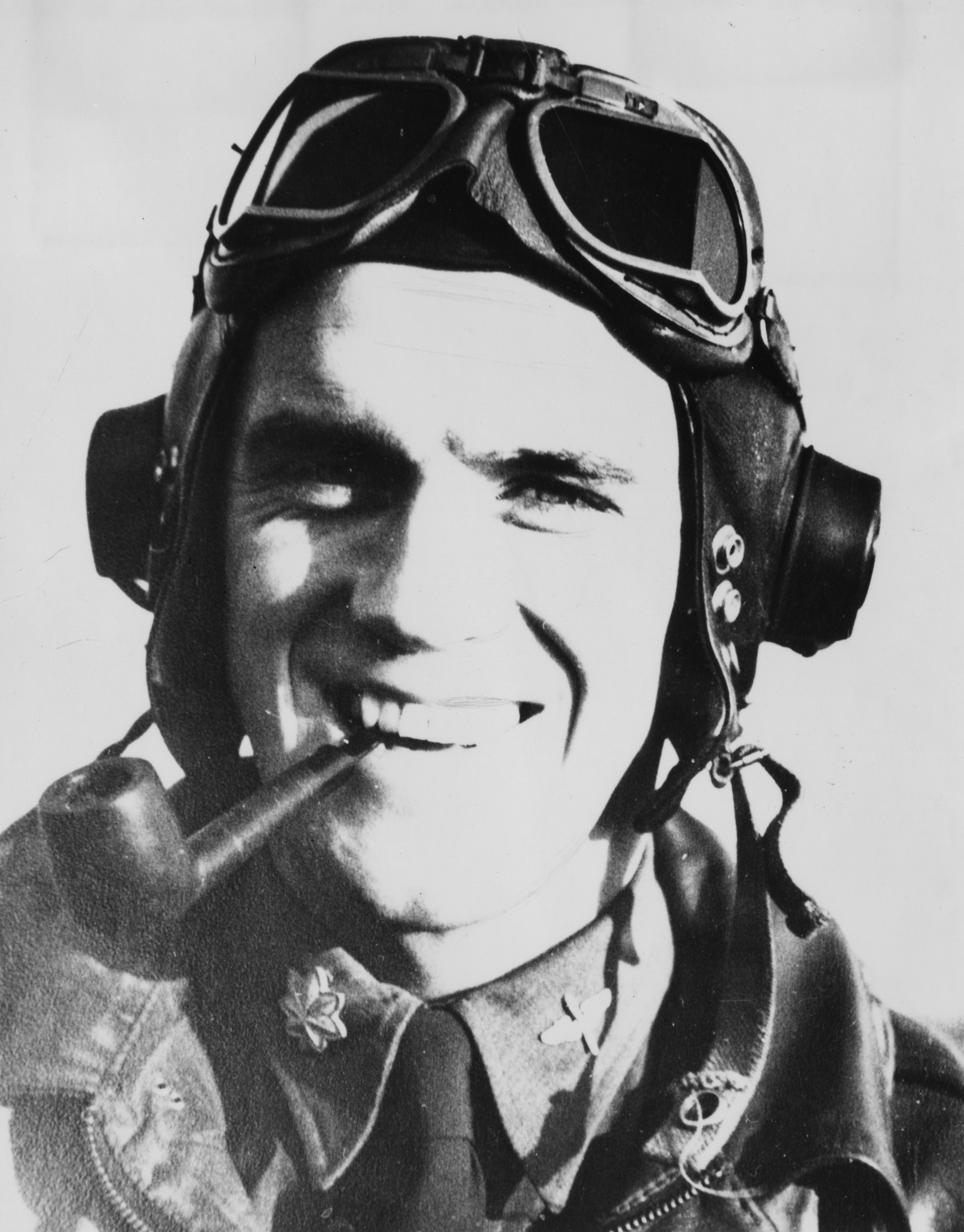
- Major Richard A Peterson of the 357th Fighter Group
- Born: February 26, 1923; Hancock, Minnesota, U.S.
- Died: June 4, 2000 (aged 77); Minneapolis, Minnesota, U.S.
- Burial place: Lakewood Cemetery; Minneapolis, Minnesota, U.S.
- Military career
- Allegiance: United States
- Branch: United States Army Air Forces
- Service years: 1942–1946
- Rank: Major
- Nicknames: Pete, Bud
- Units: 364th Fighter Squadron, 357th Fighter Group
- Conflicts: World War II
- Awards: Silver Star; Distinguished Flying Cross (3); Air Medal (13)

Richard Allen Peterson (February 26, 1923 – June 4, 2000) was a fighter ace and a major in the United States Army Air Forces. During World War II, he was the fourth highest scoring ace of 357th Fighter Group, with 15.5 aerial victories.

== Early life and education ==
Peterson was born in Hancock, Minnesota, and grew up in Alexandria, Minnesota. He graduated from Alexandria High School in 1940 and then attended the University of Minnesota. From 1940 to 1941, he was part of the university's track team.

== World War II ==
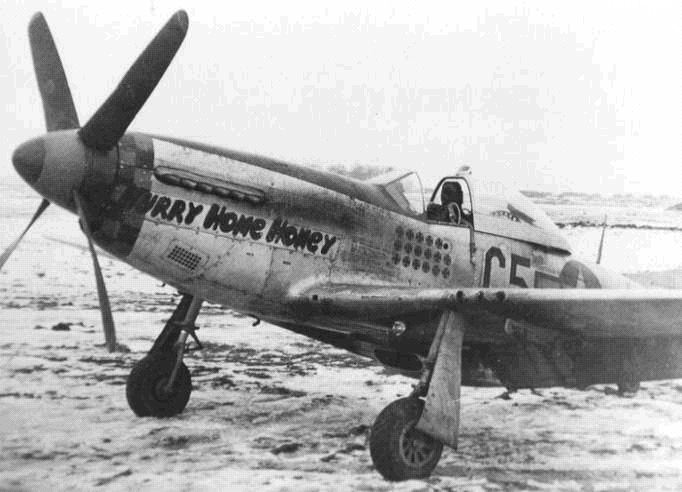
Peterson's P-51 Mustang "Hurry Home Honey"

On 30 March 1942, he enlisted in the Aviation Cadet Program of the United States Army Air Forces; in June 1942, he left the university to become an aviation cadet.

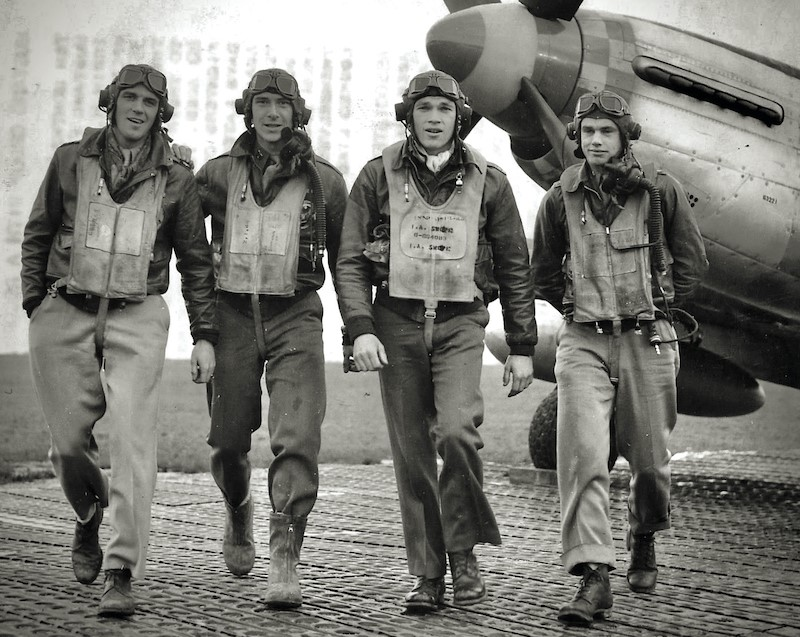
The top scoring fighter aces of the 357th Fighter Group. L-R; Richard Peterson, Leonard Carson, John England, and Clarence Anderson.

After finishing flight training in March 1943, Peterson was assigned to the 364th Fighter Squadron of the 357th Fighter Group at Tonopah, Nevada, flying Bell P-39 Airacobras. On October 4, 1943, while flying a P-39 during a transfer flight from El Paso, Texas to Tucson, Arizona, he became disoriented and got separated from his squadron. Despite navigation issues, Peterson made a deadstick landing at El Chapo, Chihuahua, Mexico, resulting in his aircraft being damaged beyond repair; the P-39's landing also damaged some railcars. Mexican officials confiscated the P-39's ammunition despite an Army Air Forces officer showing up at the crash site upon Peterson's request. Peterson was later allowed to travel back to Nevada to rejoin his fighter group.

In November 1943, the 357th Fighter Group was assigned to the European Theater of Operations, and was stationed at RAF Leiston in England—where the unit was now equipped with North American P-51 Mustangs. On March 6, 1944, he shot down a Focke-Wulf Fw 190 over Bordeaux, France, his first aerial victory. On March 16, he was credited with the shared destruction of a twin-engine Messerschmitt Bf 110, and on March 18, he shot down a Messerschmitt Bf 109 over Augsburg, Germany; his second aerial victory. By the end of May 1944, he shot down eight more enemy aircraft—including two shared destructions—bringing his total aerial victories to nine and earning him the title of flying ace. On July 1, he shot down two Bf 109s south of Saint-Quentin, France; later the same month, he returned to the United States for shore leave.

In October 1944, he returned to the 357th Fighter Group, and on October 6, he shot down a Fw 190 over Berlin, Germany; the next day, he shot down a Bf 109 over Jena, Germany. On November 2, he shot down a Bf 109 north of Merseburg, Germany. His fifteenth and final aerial victory was on November 11, when he shot down a Bf 109 over an airfield in Neuhausen, Germany. Peterson had 15.5 air victories and destroyed 3.5 aircraft on the ground while flying 150 missions. His P-51 Mustang aircraft were named Hurry Home Honey after his wife's letter closing. On one of the missions, he witnessed a Bf 109 shooting at American B-17 bomber crews in parachutes after being shot down. Peterson attacked the Bf 109 and forced the German pilot to bail out of the aircraft. He shot and killed him as he descended on his parachute. Peterson recalled that some of his unit were nervous that this would invite a retaliatory response from the Luftwaffe, "but they had to be there to know what I was seeing," Peterson said, adding that "those guys were helpless, the bomber crews going down". Peterson earned numerous awards and decorations during his career.

== Post-war ==
Peterson and his wife Elaine had three children and numerous grandchildren. After World War II, he left military service in 1946, and returned to the University of Minnesota; obtaining a degree in architecture in 1949, subsequently entering the field of architecture. In 2000, he was inducted into the Minnesota Aviation Hall of Fame.

He died of cancer on June 4, 2000, at the age of 77 and was buried at Lakewood Cemetery in Minneapolis.

== Aerial victory credits ==
Chronicle of aerial victories
Date	#	Type	Location	Aircraft flown	Unit Assigned
March 6, 1944	1	Focke-Wulf Fw 190	Bordeaux, France	P-51B Mustang	364 FS, 357 FG
March 16, 1944	0.5	Messerschmitt Bf 110	Ulm, Germany	P-51B	364 FS, 357 FG
March 18, 1944	1	Messerschmitt Bf 109	Augsburg, Germany	P-51B	364 FS, 357 FG
April 11, 1944	1	Bf 109	Magdeburg, Germany	P-51B	364 FS, 357 FG
April 24, 1944	1	Bf 109	Munich, Germany	P-51B	364 FS, 357 FG
April 30, 1944	2	Fw 190	Auxerre, France	P-51B	364 FS, 357 FG
May 12, 1944	0.5	Fw 190	Frankfurt, Germany	P-51B	364 FS, 357 FG
May 13, 1944	1.5	Messerschmitt Me 410	Grünberg, Germany	P-51B	364 FS, 357 FG
May 28, 1944	1	Bf 109	Magdeburg, Germany	P-51B	364 FS, 357 FG
July 1, 1944	2	Bf 109	Saint-Quentin, France	P-51D Mustang	364 FS, 357 FG
October 6, 1944	1	Fw 190	Berlin, Germany	P-51D	364 FS, 357 FG
October 7, 1944	1	Bf 109	Jena, Germany	P-51D	364 FS, 357 FG
November 2, 1944	1	Fw 190	Merseburg, Germany	P-51D	364 FS, 357 FG
November 11, 1944	1	Bf 109	Neuhausen, Germany	P-51D	364 FS, 357 FG

SOURCES: Air Force Historical Study 85: USAF Credits for the Destruction of Enemy Aircraft, World War II

== Awards and decorations ==
Army Air Forces Pilot Badge

Silver Star
Distinguished Flying Cross with two bronze oak leaf clusters
Air Medal with two silver and two bronze oak leaf clusters
American Campaign Medal
European-African-Middle Eastern Campaign Medal with silver campaign star
World War II Victory Medal
Croix de Guerre with bronze star (France)

Army Presidential Unit Citation

== See also ==
- Robert W. Foy
- Chuck Yeager
