= Robert W. Foy =

American flying ace

Robert William Foy
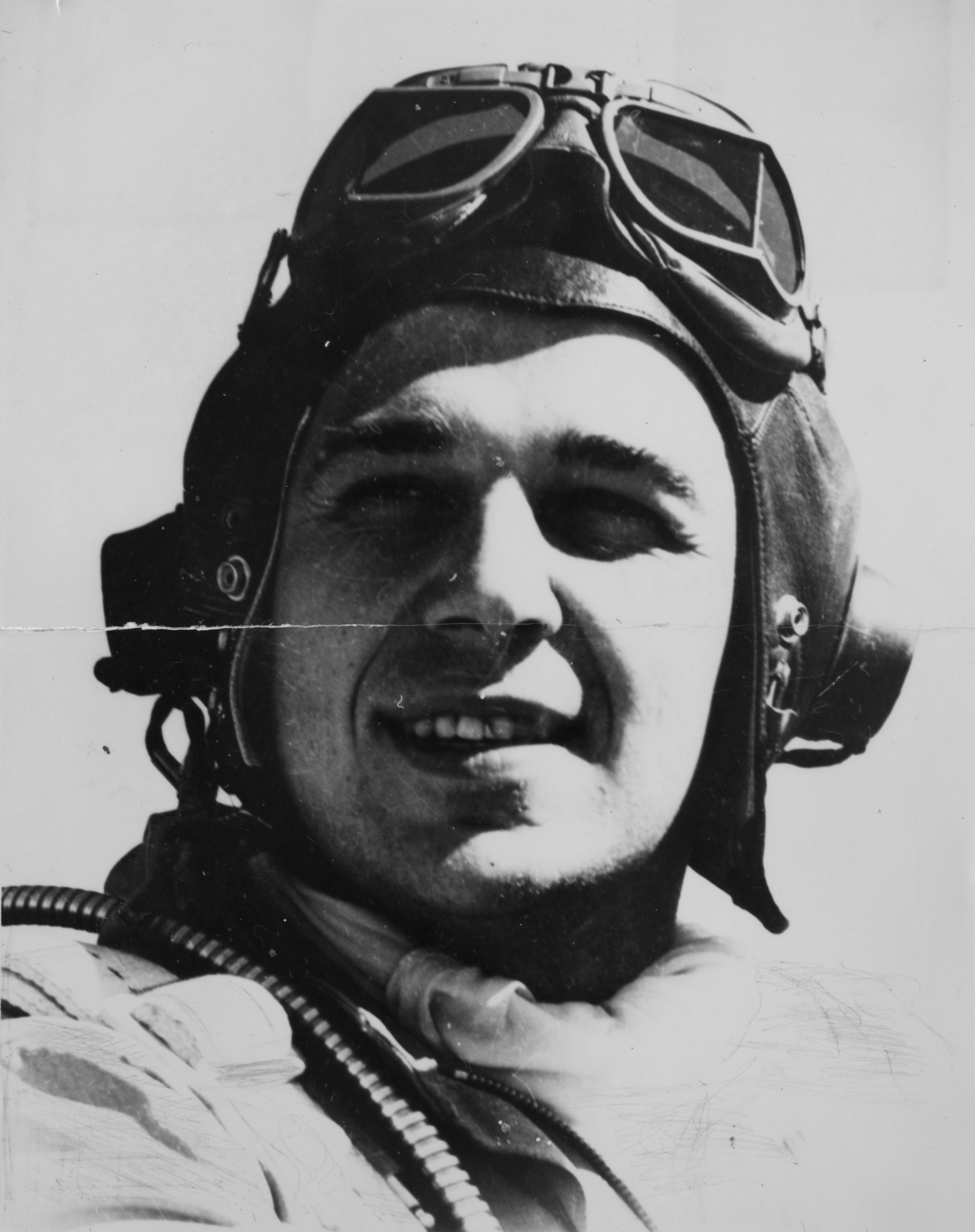
- Born: March 13, 1916; New York, U.S.
- Died: March 25, 1950 (aged 34); Gilbert, Arizona, U.S.
- Military career
- Allegiance: United States
- Branch: United States Army Air Forces; California Air National Guard
- Service years: 1942–1950
- Rank: Lieutenant Colonel
- Service number: O-745340
- Units: 357th Fighter Group; California Air National Guard
- Conflicts: World War II
- Awards: Silver Star; Distinguished Flying Cross (3); Purple Heart; Air Medal (19)

Robert William Foy (March 13, 1916 – March 25, 1950) was a United States Army Air Forces fighter pilot and triple-ace who was credited with 15 aerial victories during World War II.

== Early life ==
Foy was born on 1916 in New York.

== Military career ==
On April 2, 1942, he enlisted in the United States Army Air Force and entered flight training, and on May 20, 1943, he graduated from flight training. Upon completion of his flight training, he was assigned to the 363d Fighter Squadron of the 357th Fighter Group at Tonopah, Nevada, flying P-39 Airacobras.

=== World War II ===
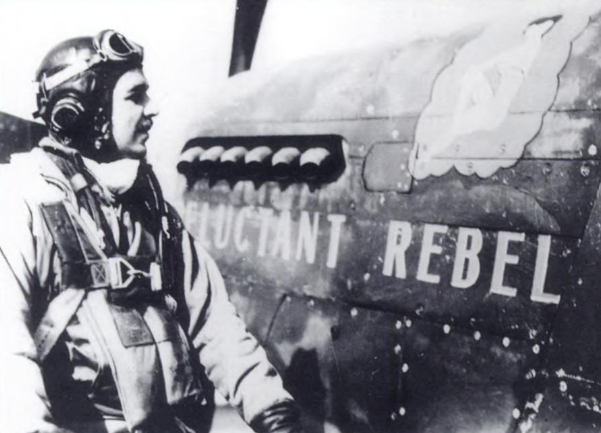
Foy with his P-51B Mustang 'Reluctant Rebel'

In November 1943, the 357th Fighter Group was assigned to European Theater of Operations and was stationed at RAF Leiston in England, where the unit was now equipped with the North American P-51 Mustangs. On May 19, 1944, he shot down three Messerschmitt Bf 109s northwest of Brandenburg, Germany, his first aerial victories. On June 29, while leading 'Cement Green flight' on a bomber escort over Leipzig, Germany, they encountered four Focke-Wulf Fw 190s. Foy shot down one Fw 190 while in a Lufberry circle. He then shot down a Bf 109 that was attacking another P-51 and also shot down another Bf 109, bringing his total aerial victories to six and earning him the title of flying ace. On 25 July, he shot down a Bf 109 over Paris, France, his seventh aerial victory, before he returned back to the United States for shore leave.

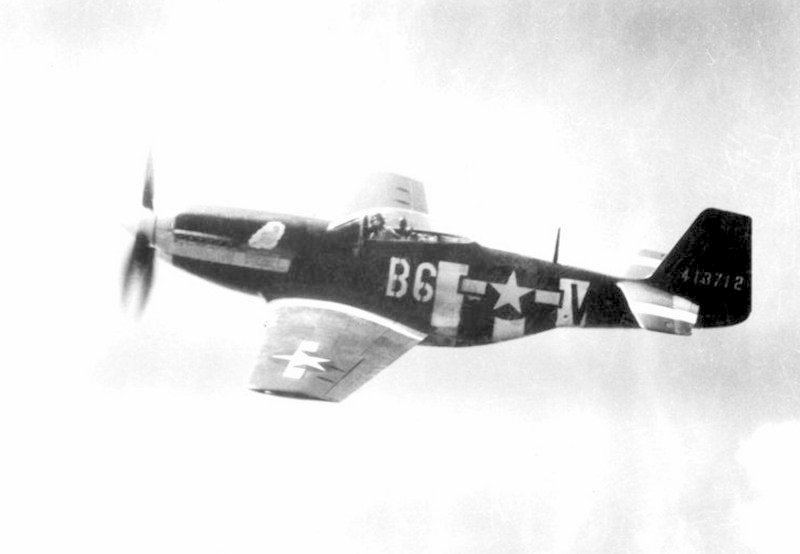
Foy's P-51D Mustang 'Reluctant Rebel'

In November 1944, Foy returned to the 357th FG for a second tour of duty. On November 18, while leading his flight to strafe an aerodrome in Strasbourg, they encountered eight Bf 109s circling around the aerodrome. Foy shot down one Bf 109 and damaged another. Before the end of 1944, he shot down three more enemy aircraft, bringing his total to 11 enemy aircraft destroyed.

On January 14, 1945, Foy led a flight escorting 3rd Air Division's B-17 Flying Fortresses over Berlin, Germany. Upon reaching the target, the flight encountered a formation of Fw 190s and Bf 109s. In the dogfight, Foy destroyed two Fw 190s. After the dogfight, Foy and his wingman strafed an enemy airfield where he managed to destroy one enemy aircraft on the ground before flying back to the home base.

On March 19, 1945, Foy took part in a flight escorting B-17 Flying Fortresses to targets in Ruhr, Germany. While over Giessen, Germany, Foy spotted three jet-powered Messerschmitt Me 262s bouncing on a flight of P-51s. He then chased the Me 262s and before they were able to accelerate out of his range, he managed to shoot at one of the Me 262 with shots hitting the aircraft's left engine. The Me 262 rolled over and crashed, crediting Foy with his fourteenth aerial victory. His fifteenth and final aerial victory was on March 24, when he shot down a Bf 109 over Gütersloh, Germany.

During World War II, Foy was credited with the destruction of 15 enemy aircraft in aerial combat plus 2 damaged, and 3 destroyed on the ground while strafing enemy airfields. While serving with the 357th FG, he flew P-51s bearing the names "Reluctant Rebel" and "Little Shrimp". During his combat tours, he was forced to ditch twice in the English Channel after being shot by enemy fire, and was rescued.

=== Post war ===
After the war, Foy left from active duty at the rank of major. He joined California Air National Guard and commanded a fighter wing, and worked as a public relations representative for North American Aviation. On March 25, 1950, while flying a B-25 Mitchell converted for civilian use, from El Paso, Texas to Inglewood, California, he was killed with five other occupants when the aircraft broke up in mid-air over Gilbert, Arizona.

== Aerial victory credits ==
Chronicle of aerial victories
Date	#	Type	Location	Aircraft flown	Unit Assigned
May 19, 1944	3	Messerschmitt Bf 109	Brandenburg, Germany	P-51B Mustang	363 FS, 357 FG
June 29, 1944	1; 2	Focke-Wulf Fw 190; Bf 109	Leipzig, Germany	P-51B	363 FS, 357 FG
July 25, 1944	1	Fw 190	Paris, France	P-51D Mustang	363 FS, 357 FG
November 18, 1944	1	Bf 109	Strasbourg, France	P-51D	363 FS, 357 FG
December 2, 1944	1	Junkers Ju 88	Koblenz, Germany	P-51D	363 FS, 357 FG
December 23, 1944	1; 1	Bf 109; Ju 88	Wetzlar, Germany	P-51D	363 FS, 357 FG
January 14, 1945	2	Fw 190	Berlin, Germany	P-51D	363 FS, 357 FG
March 19, 1945	1	Messerschmitt Me 262	Giessen, Germany	P-51D	363 FS, 357 FG
March 24, 1945	1	Bf 109	Gütersloh, Germany	P-51D	363 FS, 357 FG

SOURCES: Air Force Historical Study 85: USAF Credits for the Destruction of Enemy Aircraft, World War II

== Awards and decorations ==

USAF Senior Pilot Badge
Silver Star		Distinguished Flying Cross with two bronze oak leaf clusters
Purple Heart	Air Medal with three silver and one bronze oak leaf clusters	Air Medal with bronze oak leaf cluster (second ribbon required for accoutrement spacing)
American Campaign Medal	European-African-Middle Eastern Campaign Medal with four bronze campaign stars	World War II Victory Medal

Army Presidential Unit Citation
with bronze oak leaf cluster

=== Silver Star citation ===
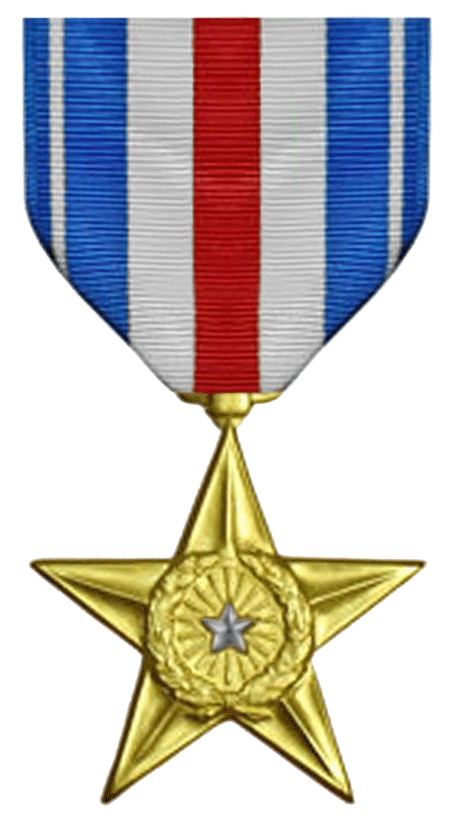

Foy, Robert W.
Major (Air Corps), U.S. Army Air Forces
363d Fighter Squadron, 357th Fighter Group, Eighth Air Force
Date of Action: June 29, 1944

Citation:

The President of the United States of America, authorized by Act of Congress July 9, 1918, takes pleasure in presenting the Silver Star to Major (Air Corps) Robert William Foy, United States Army Air Forces, for gallantry in action against the enemy as a P-51 Fighter Pilot of the 363d Fighter Squadron, 357th Fighter Group, Eighth Air Force, in action against the enemy in aerial combat in the European Theater of Operations on 29 June 1944. Major Foy led his flight of four P-51 Mustangs into a large force of enemy fighters and dispersed them. Upon firing a burst from his guns, all but one jammed. Undaunted, Major Foy attacked and destroyed one Focke Wulf 190, and then, although alone and extremely vulnerable to attack, went to the assistance of a fellow pilot. With extreme disregard for personal safety, he skillfully maneuvered the attacking aircraft within range of his one effective gun and shot it down in flames. A few minutes later, when his remaining gun ceased to function, Major Foy pursued a Messerschmitt 109 with such tenacity the plane dived into the ground and exploded. His gallant actions and dedicated devotion to duty, without regard for his own life, were in keeping with the highest traditions of military service and reflect great credit upon himself, his unit, and the United States Army Air Forces.

== See also ==
- Chuck Yeager
- Bud Anderson
- Leonard K. Carson
- John B. England
- Richard A. Peterson
