= Robert Foy =

Robert Foy may refer to:

- Robert W. Foy (1916–1950), United States Army Air Forces fighter pilot
- Robert de Foy (1893–1960), Belgian magistrate
- Robbie Foy (born 1985), Scottish footballer
- Robert Foy (ice hockey)
