= Henry Spicer (disambiguation) =

Henry Spicer (1837–1915) was an English stationer and politician.

Henrry Spicer may also refer to:

- Henry R. Spicer (1909–1968), general in the United States Air Force
- Henry Spicer (MP for Derby) for Derby
- Henry Spicer (assemblyman) in 100th New York State Legislature
- Henry Spicer (painter), see Gervase Spencer
