= Leonard K. Carson =

American flying ace (1923-1994)

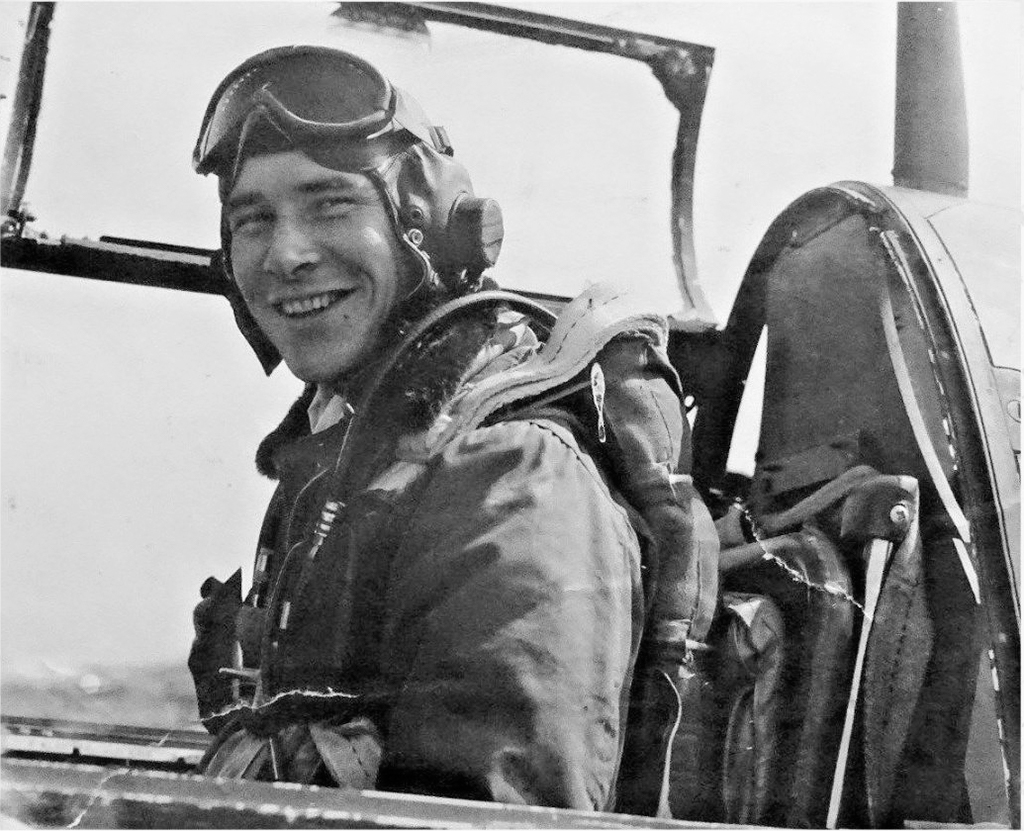
- Born: March 12, 1923; Falls City, Nebraska, U.S.
- Died: March 8, 1994 (aged 70); Chester, California, U.S.
- Burial place: Chester Cemetery; Chester, California, U.S.
- Military career
- Allegiance: United States
- Branch: United States Army Air Forces; United States Air Force
- Service years: 1942–1968
- Rank: Colonel
- Nickname: "Kit"
- Unit: 357th Fighter Group
- Commands: 362nd Fighter Squadron
- Conflicts: World War II
- Awards: Silver Star (2); Distinguished Flying Cross (3); Air Medal (17)

Leonard Kyle Carson Sr. (March 12, 1923 – March 8, 1994) was an American fighter ace and a colonel in the Air Force. During World War II, he was the highest scoring ace of 357th Fighter Group and one of the top Air Force aces of the Eighth Air Force, with 18.5 aerial victories.

== Military career ==
In April 1942, he entered the U.S. Army Air Corps Aviation Cadet Program and in April 1943, he graduated from flight training. On the same month, he was assigned to the 362nd Fighter Squadron of the 357th Fighter Group at Tonopah, Nevada, flying Bell P-39 Airacobras.

=== World War II ===
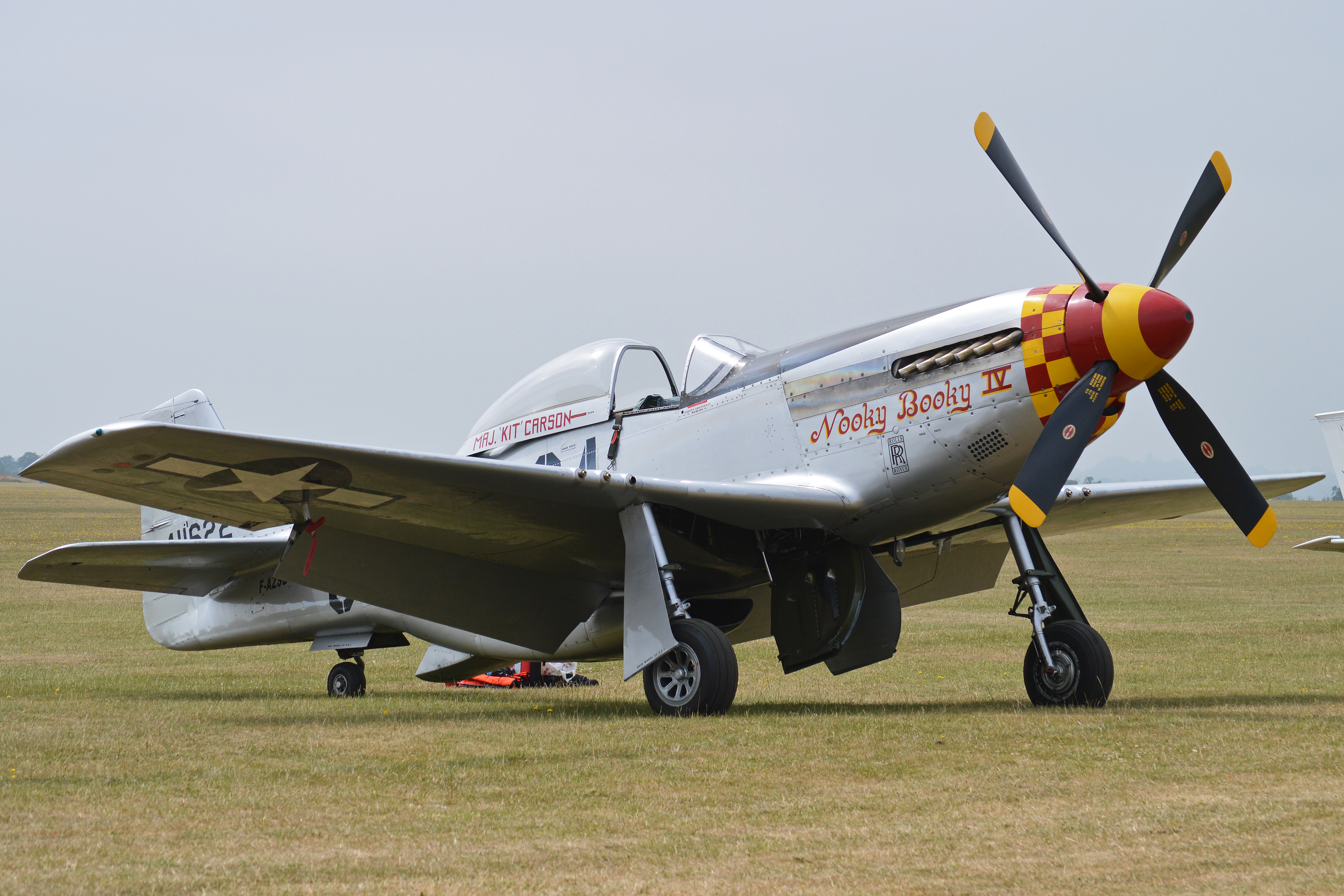
P-51 Mustang is painted to represent 'Nooky Booky IV' flown by Major 'Kit' Carson of the 362nd Fighter Squadron, 357th Fighter Group based at Leiston in Suffolk

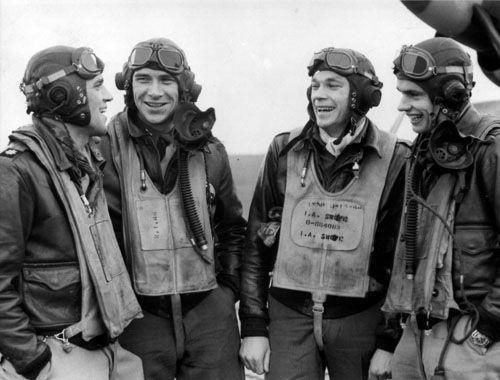
Aces of the 357th Fighter Group: (from left) Richard A. Peterson, Carson, John B. England and Bud Anderson

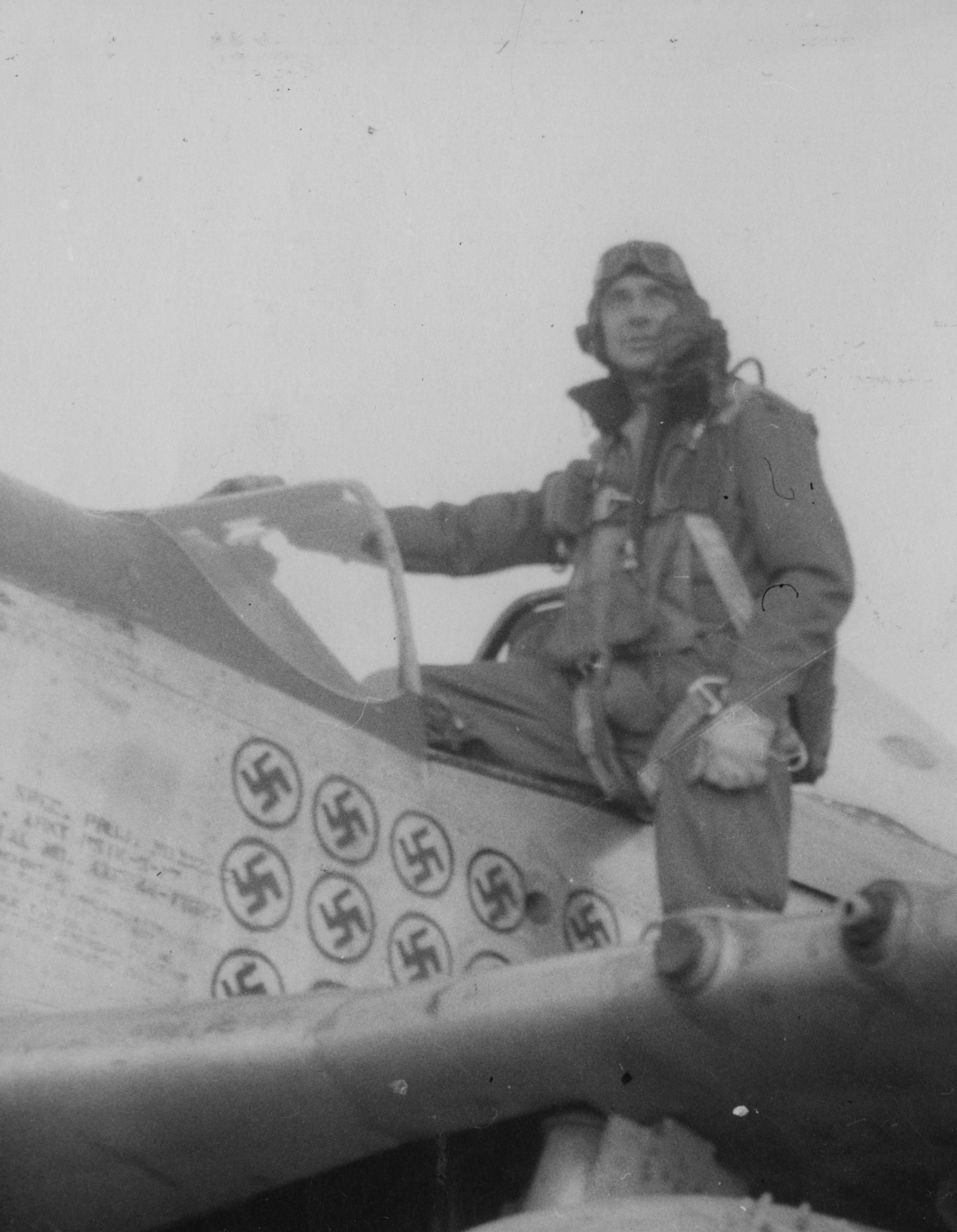
Carson onboard his P-51 Mustang

In November 1943, the 357th Fighter Group was assigned to European Theater of Operations and was stationed at RAF Leiston in England, where the unit was now equipped with the North American P-51 Mustangs. On April 8, 1944, Carson was credited with a shared aerial victory and on April 13, he shot down a Focke-Wulf Fw 190 over Mannheim, Germany, his first solo aerial victory. On May 28, he scored his second aerial victory and on May 30, during a bomber escort near Bernburg, Germany, he shot down a Messerschmitt Me 410 that was attempting to attack the bombers, his third aerial victory. By the end of July 1944, he scored two more aerial victories, bringing his total to five aerial victories and earning the title of flying ace. Following this, he returned to the United States for shore leave.

In November 1944, he returned to the 357th FG and on November 2, he shot down a Messerschmitt Bf 109 over Naumburg. On November 27, while leading 'Blue flight' and providing fighter escort for another set of fighters, the flight encountered large formation of German fighters. In the dogfight, Carson shot down five Fw 190s, making him one of the 38 USAAF pilots to become an "ace in a day" and bought his total aerial victories to 11. On December 2, 1944, he shot down two Bf 109s during a bomber escort over Bingen, Germany. Before the end of the year, he shot down two more enemy airplanes.

On January 14, 1945, Carson led a flight escorting 3rd Air Division's B-17 Flying Fortresses over Berlin, Germany. During the escort, some of the P-51s in the escort formation aborted flight and returned to home base. As Carson and his flight continued with the mission and as they reached the target, they encountered a formation of 120 German fighters. In the dogfight, Carson downed two Fw 190s and one Bf 109, bringing his total aerial victories to 18, his last aerial victories of the war. In the mission, the 357th FG downed over 57 1/2 German aircraft. Following the success of the mission, Lt. General Jimmy Doolittle, the commanding officer of the Eighth Air Force, sent a message to the 357th FG:

You gave the Hun the most humiliating beating that he has ever taken in the air. Extend my personal admiration and congratulations to each member of you command both ground and air, for a superb victory.

In March 1945, he was appointed as commander of the 362nd FS. On April 18, 1945, he damaged two jet-powered Messerschmitt Me 262s in aerial combat over Prague, Czechoslovakia.

During World War II, Carson was credited with the destruction of 18.5 enemy aircraft in aerial combat plus 3 damaged, and 3.5 destroyed on the ground while strafing enemy airfields. While serving with the 357th FG, he flew P-51s bearing the name "Nooky Booky". During his time in the 357th FG, he ran 357th FG's air combat school called "Clobber College".

=== Post war ===
After the war, Carson continued to serve in the newly created United States Air Force (USAF), and was involved in experimentation with aerodynamics and flight testing within the USAF. He retired in 1968, at the rank of colonel.

== Later life ==
After his retirement from the Air Force, Carson worked in the aerospace industry. In 1978, he published his book Pursue & Destroy: Eighth Air Force's Fighter Group in WWII, which recounted his aerial combat experiences during World War II.

Carson died on March 8, 1994, at the age of 70.

== Aerial victory credits ==
Chronicle of aerial victories
| Date | # | Type | Location | Aircraft flown | Unit Assigned |
|---|---|---|---|---|---|
| April 8, 1944 | 0.5 | Messerschmitt Bf 109 | Brunswick, Germany | P-51B Mustang | 362 FS, 357 FG |
| April 13, 1944 | 1 | Focke-Wulf Fw 190 | Mannheim, Germany | P-51B | 362 FS, 357 FG |
| May 28, 1944 | 1 | Fw 190 | Magdeburg, Germany | P-51B | 362 FS, 357 FG |
| May 30, 1944 | 1 | Messerschmitt Me 410 | Bernburg, Germany | P-51B | 362 FS, 357 FG |
| July 25, 1944 | 1 | Fw 190 | Paris, France | P-51D Mustang | 362 FS, 357 FG |
| July 29, 1944 | 1 | Bf 109 | Merseburg, Germany | P-51D | 362 FS, 357 FG |
| November 2, 1944 | 1 | Bf 109 | Naumburg, Germany | P-51D | 362 FS, 357 FG |
| November 27, 1944 | 5 | Fw 190 | Merseburg, Germany | P-51D | 362 FS, 357 FG |
| December 2, 1944 | 2 | Bf 109 | Bingen, Germany | P-51D | 362 FS, 357 FG |
| December 5, 1944 | 1 | Bf 109 | Berlin, Germany | P-51D | 362 FS, 357 FG |
| December 24, 1944 | 1 | Bf 109 | Fulda, Germany | P-51K Mustang | 362 FS, 357 FG |
| January 14, 1945 | 2; 1 | Fw 190; Bf 109 | Berlin, Germany | P-51K | 362 FS, 357 FG |

SOURCES: Air Force Historical Study 85: USAF Credits for the Destruction of Enemy Aircraft, World War II

== Awards and decorations ==
His awards include:

USAF Command Pilot Badge
| Silver Star with bronze oak leaf cluster | | Distinguished Flying Cross with two bronze oak leaf clusters |
| Air Medal with three silver and one bronze oak leaf clusters | Air Force Presidential Unit Citation | American Campaign Medal |
| European-African-Middle Eastern Campaign Medal with four bronze campaign stars | World War II Victory Medal | Army of Occupation Medal with 'Germany' clasp |
| National Defense Service Medal with bronze service star | Air Force Longevity Service Award with silver oak leaf cluster | Distinguished Flying Cross (United Kingdom) |
