= Donald William Graham =

United States Air Force general

- Born: 1917; San Francisco, California
- Died: January 18, 2010 (aged 92–93)
- Military career
- Allegiance: United States
- Branch: United States Army Air Corps; United States Army Air Forces; United States Air Force
- Service years: 1939–1971
- Rank: Major General
- Service number: O-25247
- Commands: 357th Fighter Group; Twenty-First Air Force

Donald William Graham (1917-2010) was a major general in the United States Air Force. He commanded the 357th Fighter Group from March to October 1944.

== Life and Awards ==
Graham was born in 1917 in San Francisco, California, then he entered the University of California and received a Bachelor of Science in Electrical Engineering in 1939. Graham entered active military service in October 1939 as a flying cadet and was commissioned as a Second Lieutenant in the Air Corps Reserve in June 1940. Graham’s decorations include the Silver Star, Legion of Merit with oak leaf cluster, Distinguished Flying Cross with oak leaf cluster, Air Medal with three oak leaf clusters, Air Force Commendation Medal and Croix de Guerre with Palm (France).
