= Donald H. Bochkay =

American flying ace (1916–1981)

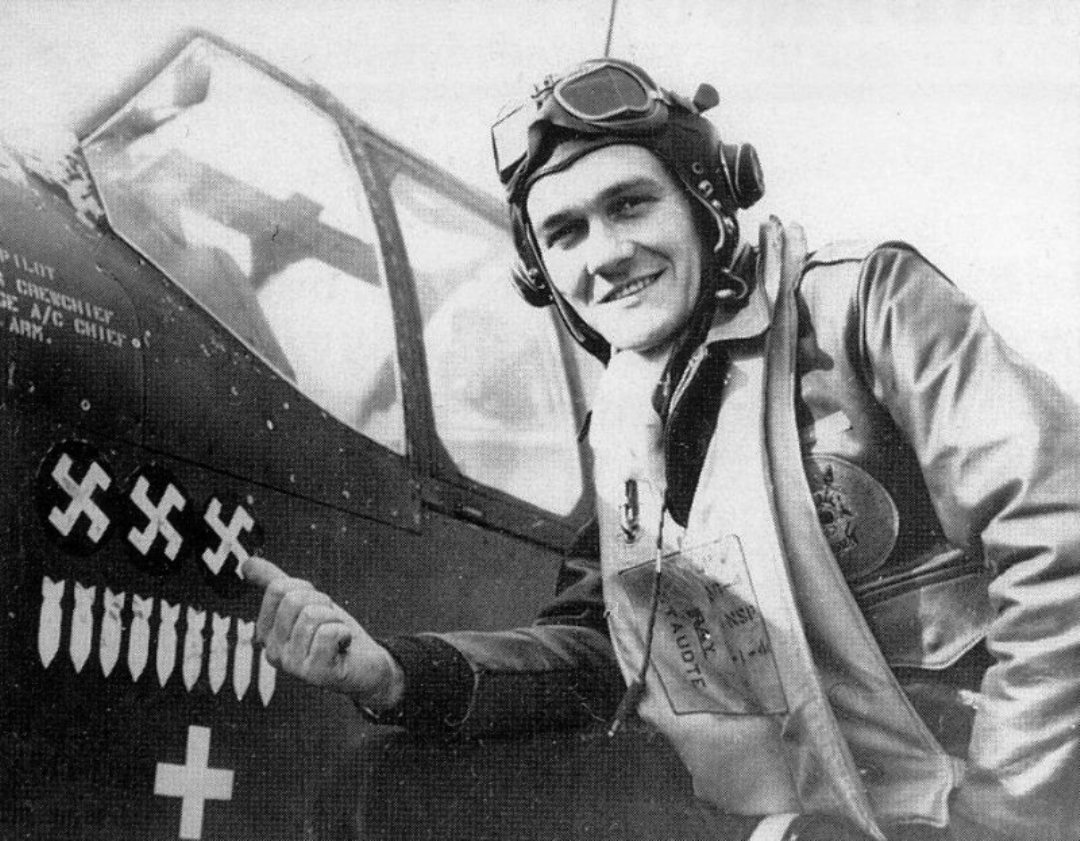
- Bochkay in 1944
- Born: September 19, 1916; Ashtabula, Ohio, U.S.
- Died: January 9, 1981 (aged 64)
- Military career
- Allegiance: United States
- Branch: United States Army Air Forces; United States Air Force
- Service years: 1940–1945; 1956–1970
- Rank: Lieutenant colonel
- Unit: 357th Fighter Group
- Commands: 363d Fighter Squadron
- Conflicts: World War II
- Awards: Distinguished Flying Cross (4); Air Medal (14)

Donald Harlow Bochkay (September 19, 1916 – January 9, 1981) was an American fighter ace in the United States Army Air Forces. During World War II, he was credited with destroying 13 enemy airplanes in aerial combat, including two jet-powered Messerschmitt Me 262s.

== Early life ==
Donald Harlow Bochkay was born on September 19, 1916, in Ashtabula, Ohio, and was of Hungarian descent. At the age of nine, he moved with his family to the San Fernando Valley, California, and in 1935, he graduated from Hollywood High School in Los Angeles.

== Military career ==
In 1940, Bochkay entered the United States military as a private with the 7th Infantry Division in Fort Ord, California. In 1941, he was transferred to the Aviation Cadet Program of the United States Army Air Corps. In April 1943, he was commissioned as second lieutenant and earned his pilot wings.

=== World War II ===
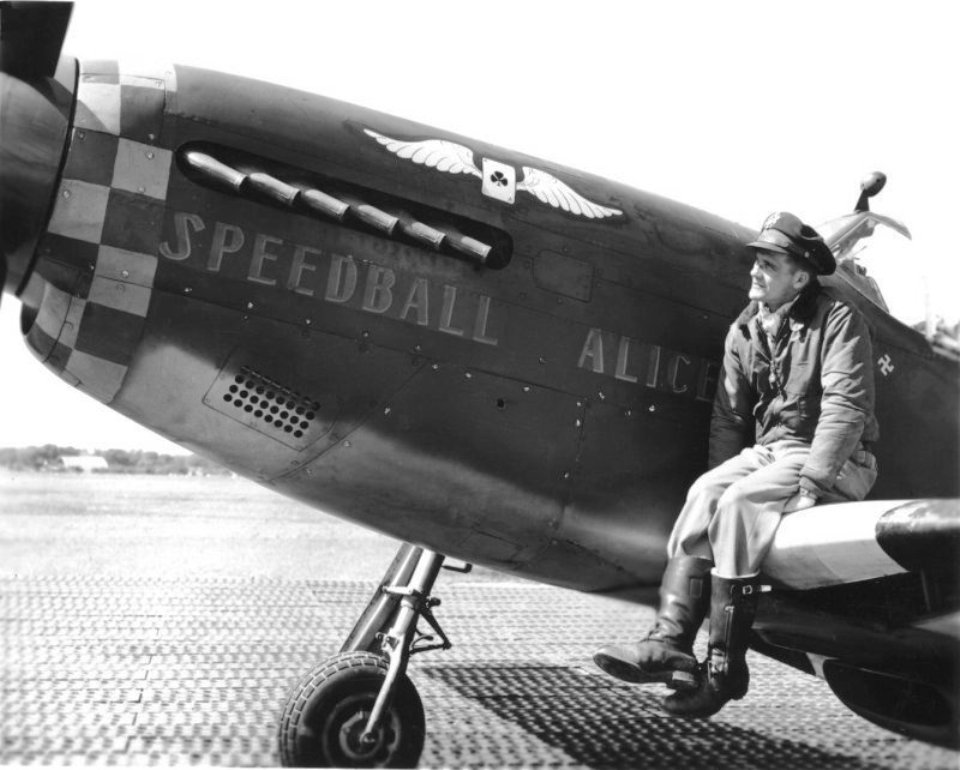
Bochkay with his P-51B "Speedball Alice"

Following the completion of his flight training, Bochkay was assigned as a Bell P-39 Airacobra pilot with the 363d Fighter Squadron of the 357th Fighter Group in Tonopah, Nevada, in May 1943. In November 1943, the 357th Fighter Group was assigned to the European Theater of Operations and was stationed at RAF Leiston in England, where the unit was equipped with the propeller-driven North American P-51 Mustangs.

On March 5, 1944, over Bordeaux, France, Bochkay and two other pilots jointly shot down a Focke-Wulf Fw 190. On March 6, during a bomber escort over Berlin, Germany, he shot down two twin-engined Messerschmitt Bf 110s, his first two solo aerial victories. In April, he shot down two more enemy aircraft. On June 29, he shot down a Messerschmitt Bf 109 over Schöningen, Germany, his fifth aerial victory, earning the title of flying ace.

On July 5, during a fighter mission over Rouen, France, he shot down a Bf 109 and Fw 190. Before the end of July, he shot down two more enemy airplanes. In August, he returned to the United States on leave. In October, he returned to the 357th FG and, on December 5, he shot down two Fw 190s northwest of Berlin, bringing his total aerial victories to 11.

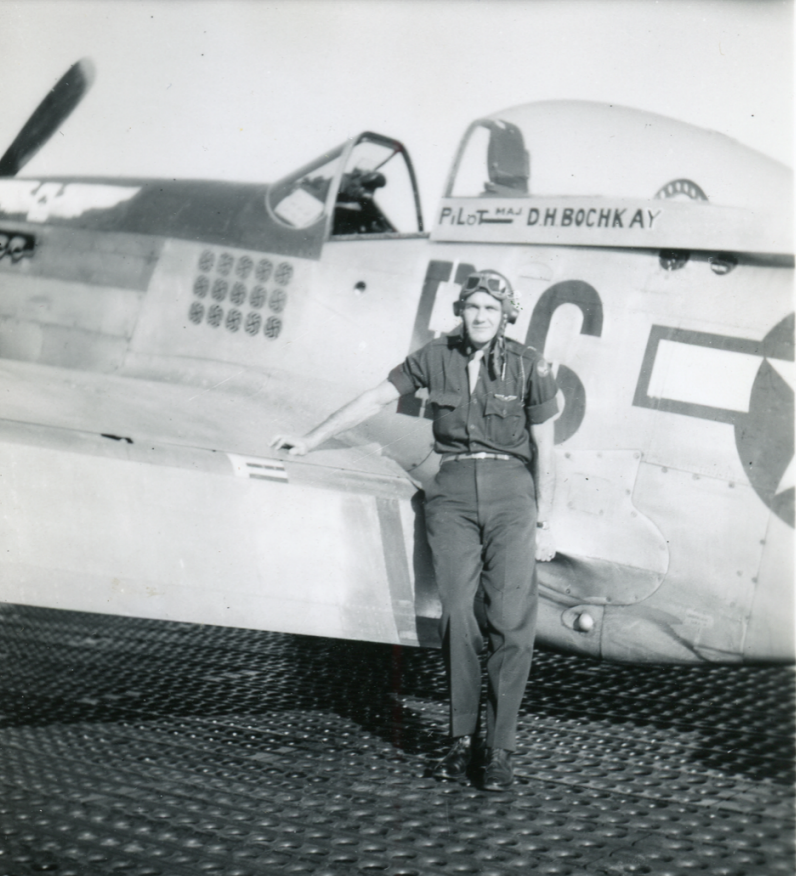
Bochkay next to his P-51D "Winged Ace of Clubs"

In February 1945, Bochkay was appointed Commander of the 363d Fighter Squadron and on February 9 during a fighter escort of B-17 Flying Fortresses of the 3rd Air Division over Fulda, Germany, a formation of four jet-powered Messerschmitt Me 262s was spotted 4,000 ft below the fighter escort. Bochkay dropped his P-51's external tanks and chased the Me 262s with his wing mate, Captain James W. Browning. The Me 262s broke into pairs with Bochkay and Browning chasing each pair. Bochkay was chasing the Me 262s over 28,000 ft; as they leveled out, the jets made a steep climbing turn to the right. He continued to dive after them and overshot before turning right and positioning himself toward one of the Me 262s. At 300 yards, he shot at a Me 262 as it accelerated to go out of range. The jet turned left, allowing Bochkay to fire at it again, resulting in a gunfire strike to the cockpit of the Me 262, and the consequent death of the pilot. The Me 262 crashed, crediting Bochkay with his first aerial victory over a jet. Bochkay attempted to go after another Me 262 that pounced on a group of P-51s before his aircraft's ammunition was exhausted. He had to rejoin with another P-51 to head back to base after Browning was killed during the combat.

On April 18, 1945, Bochkay shot down another Me 262 that was taking off from Ruzyně Airport in Prague, Czechoslovakia, his thirteenth and final aerial victory of the war.

During World War II, Bochkay flew a total of 123 combat missions and was credited with the destruction of 13.83 enemy aircraft in aerial combat plus 2 shared, as well as 1 destroyed on the ground while strafing enemy airfields. While serving with the 357th FG, he flew P-51s bearing the names "Alice in Wonderland," "Speedball Alice," and "Winged Ace of Clubs." During the war, he obtained a silk underwear and using it to impress an English barmaid, he remarked "stick with me honey, and you'll be farting through silk."

=== Post war ===
Following the end of World War II, Bochkay left active duty. In 1956, he re-entered active duty with the United States Air Force and retired in 1970 with the rank of lieutenant colonel.

Following his retirement from military service in 1970, Bochkay visited his former WWII base at RAF Leiston. Noting in a letter his World War II memories at the base and how derelict it had become 25 years after the end of the war, Bochkay concluded the letter with the comment, "Have a good trip if you go to Leiston, and don't be ashamed to cry."

Bochkay died on January 9, 1981, at the age of 64. He was cremated, and his ashes were scattered in the San Francisco Bay.

== Aerial victory credits ==
Chronicle of aerial victories
Date	#	Type	Location	Aircraft flown	Unit Assigned
March 5, 1944	0.15	Focke-Wulf Fw 190	Bordeaux, France	P-51B Mustang	363 FS, 357 FG
March 6, 1944	2	Messerschmitt Bf 110	Berlin, Germany	P-51B	363 FS, 357 FG
April 8, 1944	1	Messerschmitt Bf 109	Brunswick, Germany	P-51B	363 FS, 357 FG
April 11, 1944	0.5	Bf 109	Magdeburg, Germany	P-51B	363 FS, 357 FG
April 24, 1944	1	Bf 109	Munich, Germany	P-51B	363 FS, 357 FG
June 29, 1944	1	Bf 109	Schöningen, Germany	P-51B	363 FS, 357 FG
July 5, 1944	1; 1	Bf 109; Fw 190	Rouen, France	P-51C Mustang	363 FS, 357 FG
July 25, 1944	1	Bf 109	Paris, France	P-51D Mustang	363 FS, 357 FG
July 29, 1944	1	Fw 190	Merseburg, Germany	P-51D	363 FS, 357 FG
December 5, 1944	2	Fw 190	Berlin, Germany	P-51D	363 FS, 357 FG
February 9, 1945	1	Messerschmitt Me 262	Fulda, Germany	P-51K Mustang	363 FS, 357 FG
April 18, 1945	1	Me 262	Prague, Czechoslovakia	P-51D	363 FS, 357 FG

SOURCES: Air Force Historical Study 85: USAF Credits for the Destruction of Enemy Aircraft, World War II

== Awards and decorations ==

U.S. Air Force Command Pilot Badge
Distinguished Flying Cross with three bronze oak leaf clusters	Air Medal with two silver and two bronze oak leaf clusters	Air Medal (second ribbon required for accoutrement spacing)
Air Force Presidential Unit Citation with two bronze oak leaf clusters	American Defense Service Medal	American Campaign Medal
European–African–Middle Eastern Campaign Medal with silver and bronze campaign stars	World War II Victory Medal	Army of Occupation Medal with 'Germany' clasp
National Defense Service Medal	Air Force Longevity Service Award with four bronze oak leaf clusters	Croix de Guerre with Palm (France)

== Bibliography ==
- Chapis, Stephen; Thomas, Andrew (2017). Allied Jet Killers of World War 2 (Hardcover). Bloomsbury Publishing. ISBN 9781472823502.
- Toliver, Raymond; Constable, Trevor J. (1979). Fighter Aces of the U.S.A. (Hardcover). Aero Publishers. ISBN 9780816857920.
- Yeager, Chuck; Janos, Leo (1999). Yeager: An Autobiography (Hardcover). Bantam Dell. ISBN 9780553256741.
