= Edwin Shepard Chickering =

United States Air Force general

Edwin S. Chickering
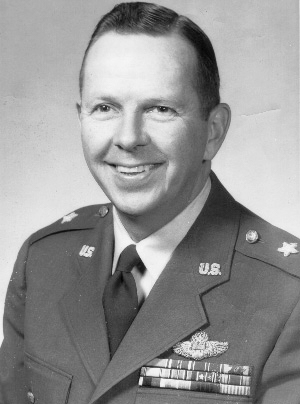
- Brigadier General Edwin S. Chickering
- Born: 21 September 1912; Oil City, Pennsylvania, US
- Died: 14 February 2003 (aged 90); Little Rock, Arkansas, US
- Burial place: Arlington National Cemetery
- Military career
- Allegiance: United States of America
- Branch: United States Army Air Corps; United States Army Air Forces; United States Air Force
- Service years: 1935–1967
- Rank: Brigadier General
- Nickname: Chick
- Service number: O-21405
- Commands: 357th Fighter Group; 367th Fighter Group; 405th Fighter Bomber Wing; 836th Air Division
- Conflicts: World War II; Korean War

Edwin Shepard Chickering (21 September 1912 – 14 February 2003) was a brigadier general in the United States Air Force.

== Early life ==
Chickering was born in Oil City, Pennsylvania on 21 September 1912. He graduated from Lehigh University in 1935 with a degree in engineering.

After graduating, he joined the United States Army Air Corps and attended flight school. He was commissioned a second lieutenant and assigned to Kelly Field in Texas.

== World War II ==
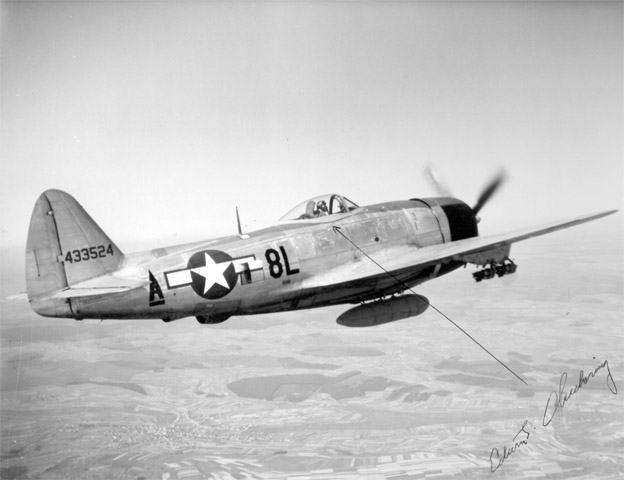
Col. Edwin S. "Chick" Chickering in his P-47 Thunderbolt in 1945

During World War II, Chickering commanded the 357th Fighter Group in England and later commanded the 367th Fighter Group in Europe.

== Korean War ==
During the Korean War Chickering commanded of the 67th Tactical Reconnaissance Wing.

== Post-retirement ==
After retiring from the US Air Force Chickering worked for a Baltimore, Maryland, engineering firm. Upon his death he was buried at Arlington National Cemetery.

== Awards and decorations ==
Chickering was awarded the Legion of Merit, the Distinguished Flying Cross with Oak Leaf Cluster, the Air Medal with seven Oak Leaf Clusters, the Bronze Star, and the French Croix de Guerre with Palm.
