= 357th Fighter Group =

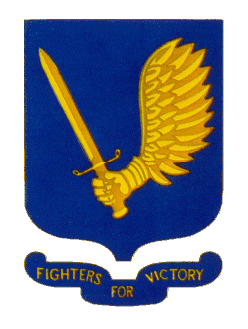
- 357th Fighter Group
- Active: 16 December 1942 – 20 August 1946
- Country: United States
- Branch: United States Army Air Forces
- Type: Fighter group
- Role: Air Superiority
- Size: 125 P-51 aircraft, 1000 personnel
- Part of: 66th Fighter Wing; Eighth Air Force
- Garrison/HQ: RAF Leiston, UK
- Nickname: "The Yoxford Boys"
- Motto: Semper Omnia (All Things at All Times)
- Engagements: DUC: Berlin, 6 March 1944 and Leipzig, 29 June 1944; DUC: Derben, 14 January 1945; Big Week; 313 group missions

The 357th Fighter Group was an air combat unit of the United States Army Air Forces during the Second World War. The 357th operated P-51 Mustang aircraft as part of the U.S. Eighth Air Force and its members were known unofficially as the Yoxford Boys after the village of Yoxford near their base in the UK. (Group tradition holds that the name was the invention of Lord Haw-Haw in a broadcast greeting the night of its arrival at RAF Leiston.) Its victory totals in air-to-air combat are the most of any P-51 group in the Eighth Air Force and third among all groups fighting in Europe.

The 357th flew 313 combat missions between 11 February 1944 and 25 April 1945. It is officially credited by the U.S. Air Force with having destroyed 595.5 German airplanes in the air and 106.5 on the ground. The 357th as such existed as a USAAF unit only during World War II; postwar, the group became an Ohio Air National Guard group which is a direct descendant of the 357th FG.

== History ==
=== Lineage ===
- Constituted as 357th Fighter Group on 1 December 1942 and activated the same day.

Inactivated in Germany on 20 August 1946

- Redesignated 121st Fighter Group. Allotted to the National Guard on 21 August 1946

=== Assignments ===
- IV Fighter Command, 1 December 1942
- 72d Fighter Wing, 7 October – 9 November 1943
- 66th Fighter Wing, 31 January 1944

Attached to: 1st Bombardment (later Air) Division, 15 September 1943 – 8 July 1945

- XII Fighter Command, 21 July 1945 – 20 August 1946

=== Components ===
- 362d Fighter Squadron: (G4) 1 December 1942 – 20 August 1946
- 363d Fighter Squadron: (B6) 1 December 1942 – 20 August 1946
- 364th Fighter Squadron: (C5) 1 December 1942 – 20 August 1946

=== Stations ===
- Hamilton Field, California, 1 December 1942
- Tonopah Army Airfield, Nevada, 4 March 1943
- Santa Rosa Army Airfield, California, 3 June 1943
- Oroville Army Airfield, California, 18 August 1943
- Casper Army Airfield, Wyoming, 7 October – 9 November 1943
- RAF Raydon (USAAF Station 157), England, 30 November 1943
- RAF Leiston (USAAF Station 373), England, 31 January 1944 – 8 July 1945
- Fliegerhorst Neubiberg (ALG R-85), Germany, 21 July 1945 – 20 August 1946.

=== Aircraft ===
- P-39 Airacobra, 1942–1943
- P-51B/C/D/K Mustang, 1943–1945

=== 357th FG command staff ===
Group Commanders	Dates of command	Casualty Status
Lt.Col. Loring G. Stetson, Jr.	16 December 1942 – 7 July 1943	
Lt.Col. Edwin S. Chickering	7 July 1943 – 17 February 1944	
Col. Henry R. Spicer	17 February 1944 – 5 March 1944	Prisoner of war
Col. Donald W. Graham	7 March 1944 – 11 October 1944	
Lt.Col. John D. Landers	12 October 1944 – 2 December 1944	
Lt.Col. Irwin H. Dregne	2 December 1944 – 21 July 1945	
Lt.Col. Andrew J. Evans	21 July 1945 – 20 November 1945	
Lt.Col. Wayne E. Rhynard	20 November 1945 – 1 April 1946	
Col. Barton M. Russell	1 April 1946 – 20 August 1946	
Deputy Group Commanders	Dates of service	Casualty Status
unknown	16 December 1942 – 27 September 1943	
Lt.Col. Donald W. Graham	27 September 1943 – 7 March 1944	
Lt.Col. Hubert I. Egnes	7 March 1944 – 28 March 1944	Killed in action
Lt.Col. Thomas L. Hayes	28 March 1944–unknown	
Lt.Col. John D. Landers	unknown–12 October 1944	
Lt.Col. Irwin H. Dregne	12 October 1944 – 2 December 1944	
Lt.Col. Andrew J. Evans	2 December 1944 – 21 July 1945	
Operations Officers (S-3s)	Dates of service	Casualty Status
Major Donald W. Graham	16 December 1942 – 27 September 1943	
unknown	27 September 1943–	
Lt.Col. Thomas L. Hayes, Jr.	14 August 1944–	

=== Squadron commanders ===
Three fighter squadrons were constituted 16 December 1942, and assigned to the group.

362d Fighter Squadron	Dates of command	Casualty Status
Lt.Col. Hubert I. Egnes	16 December 1942 – 10 March 1944	Killed in action
Major Joseph E. Broadhead	10 March 1944 – 25 August 1944	
Major John B. England	25 August 1944 – 8 April 1945	
Major Leonard K. Carson	8 April 1945 – 1 November 1945	
Captain Robert D. Brown	1 November 1945–	
363d Fighter Squadron	Dates of command	Casualty Status
Capt. Stuart R. Lauler	8 January 1943 – 20 May 1943	
Capt. Clay R. Davis	20 May 1943 – 7 July 1943	Killed in training accident
Major Donald W. Graham	−27 September 1943	
1st Lt. Wesley S. Mink	27 September 1943 – November 1943	
Capt. Joseph H. Giltner, Jr.	Nov 1943–25 January 1944	Prisoner of war
Major Montgomery H. Throop, Jr.	25 January 1944 – June 1944	
Major Edwin W. Hiro	Jun 1944–20 September 1944	Killed in action
Lt.Col. Guernsey I. Carlisle	20 September 1944 – January 1945	
Major Donald C. McGee	January 1945 – February 1945	
Major Donald H. Bochkay	Feb 1945–	
364th Fighter Squadron	Dates of command	Casualty Status
Capt. Varian K. White	16 December 1942 – 18 May 1943	Killed in training accident
Major Thomas L. Hayes, Jr.	22 May 1943 – 14 August 1944	
Major John A. Storch	14 August 1944 – May 1945	
Major Donald C. McGee	May 1945–	
Major Richard A. Peterson	14 August 1944 – 8 April 1945	

=== Non-component support organizations ===
- 50th Service Group headquarters and detachment
- 469th Service Squadron
- 70th Station Complement
- 1177th Quartermaster Company (detachment)
- 1076th Signal Company (detachment)
- 1260th Military Police Company (platoon)
- 1600th Ordnance Company (detachment)
- 18th Weather Squadron (detachment)
- 2121st Engineering Firefighting Platoon

SOURCES: Commanders, AFHRA website and Maurer Maurer; other staff and support units, Olmsted

== Training history and movement overseas ==
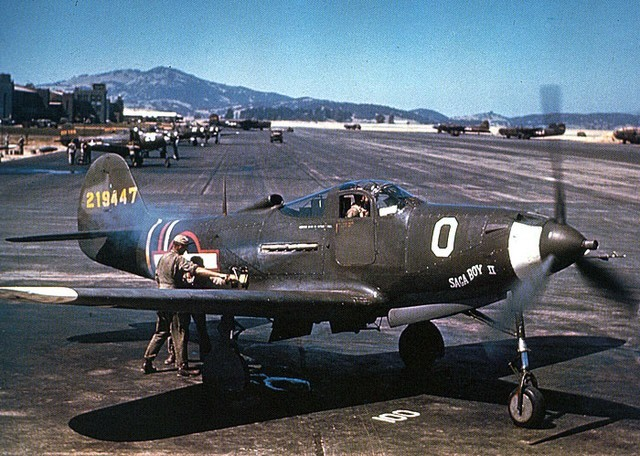
P-39Q Airacobra 42-19447 Saga Boy II of Lt.Col. Edwin S. Chickering, July 1943.

The 357th remained at Hamilton Field, while its squadrons were activated and personnel and equipment acquired. Cadre for the new group were drawn from the 328th Fighter Group, already at Hamilton. Two of the three designated squadron commanders had served in the Philippines during the first days of the war, Major Hubert Egnes with the 17th Pursuit Squadron, and Captain Varian White with the 20th Pursuit Squadron, and both had air-to-air victories over Japanese aircraft.

On 3 March 1943, the group moved by rail to Tonopah, Nevada, where it remained until 3 June. At Tonopah the members lived in and worked under primitive conditions, described as "tar-paper shacks", and without enclosed hangar maintenance facilities. They inherited much-used P-39 Airacobra fighters from the 354th Fighter Group, training at Tonopah preceding them, and immediately began a regimen of six-day work weeks with six sorties a day practicing air-to-air combat, bombing, and strafing maneuvers. While adequately powered at low altitudes and suited for close support operations, the P-39 was prone to stalls at higher altitudes. Three pilots and a flight surgeon died in training accidents while at Tonopah, including Captain White, who was replaced by Major Thomas Hayes, another veteran of the early Pacific campaign.

In June the group entered its next training phase, changing stations to Santa Rosa Army Air Field, California (the 362 FS was based at nearby Hayward). There the group continued training on P-39s, flying bomber escort and coastal patrol practice missions. On 7 July 1943, a mid-air collision occurred between two P-39s, killing both pilots including Captain Clay Davis, commander of the 363 FS. On the same date the group commander, Lt.Col. Stetson, relinquished command, and sources who were present at the time are contradictory about a possible connection: Olmsted states that Stetson was sent overseas to command a fighter group; Chuck Yeager said he was relieved of command for the high death rate in training. Thirteen pilots and a flight surgeon died in P-39 training accidents in the United States, and numerous aircraft were lost or heavily damaged in non-fatal accidents.

The 357th received an influx of 60 new pilots and moved again, to bases at Oroville and Marysville, California in August 1943. It entered its final phase of training on 28 September with the squadrons redeploying to Second Air Force bases at Pocatello, Idaho; Casper, Wyoming; and Ainsworth, Nebraska, respectively, where they engaged in large-formation mock interceptor missions against bomber groups in training. On 24 October after a final tactical inspection, the group was declared ready for overseas deployment. Beginning 3 November, the 357th turned in its P-39s and entrained for Camp Shanks, New York, where the entire group staged for embarkation aboard the RMS Queen Elizabeth, departing New York City on 23 November 1943. Debarking at Greenock, Scotland, on 29 November, the group immediately moved by train to its base in Suffolk.

== Combat operations and tactics ==
All mission dates, targets, and details from Roger Freeman, Mighty Eighth War Diary, by date of mission. German unit identifications are from Merle Olmsted.

=== Ninth Air Force ===
The 357th had been allocated to the Ninth Air Force as a P-51 tactical air support unit. It moved into its base at RAF Raydon on 30 November 1943. It had no aircraft until 19 December, when the it received a former Mustang III of RAF Fighter Command, hastily repainted in U.S. olive drab. By the end of the year the 357th received 15 Mustangs, severely restricting conversion training for the pilots, and some made the transition by ferrying in new aircraft. All but a handful gained flying experience in the new aircraft only by flying combat operations.

This handful, consisting of group and squadron commanders and proposed flight leaders, made approximately a dozen sorties on escort missions with the 354th Fighter Group, which had been flying combat only since 1 December. Pilots from both units learned that the P-51s still had maintenance flaws to be worked out, primarily in guns that jammed in maneuvering and engines that overheated from loss of coolant, and the commanding officer of the 363 FS was shot down on a mission while flying with the 354th Fighter Group on 25 January 1944.

The need for a long-range escort fighter had resulted in a decision to give the Eighth Air Force a priority for the Mustang, reversing the earlier allocation of these groups to the Ninth for tactical support of Allied ground operations in France. The 357th was reassigned to VIII Fighter Command in exchange for a P-47 group that had already begun combat operations, and at the end of January, changed bases with the 358th Fighter Group, moving to its permanent base at RAF Leiston on 31 January.

=== VIII Fighter Command, Eighth Air Force ===
==== Initial operations ====
Assigned to the 66th Fighter Wing, the 357th was the first P-51 Mustang Group of the Eighth Air Force. Between its move to Leiston and 11 February, when it flew its first combat mission, the group received a full inventory of P-51B fighters. On 8 February six pilots flew a final mission with the 354th, a deep penetration bomber escort to Frankfurt, Germany, and lost a pilot killed in action.

The first group mission, led by Medal of Honor-recipient Major James H. Howard of the 354th FG, was an escort mission for B-24's bombing V-1 sites in the Pas de Calais. The new commander of the 4th Fighter Group, Lt.Col. Don Blakeslee, led two similar missions on 12 and 13 February, with the first combat loss occurring on 13 February. The 357th changed commanders on 17 February, its former commander Col. Chickering moving up to a staff position in the Ninth Air Force, and its new CO Col. Spicer the former executive officer of the 66th Fighter Wing.

The groups' fourth combat mission was its first over Germany, at the start of the coordinated strategic bombing attacks against the Luftwaffe and the German aircraft industry that came to be called the "Big Week." The 357th flew all five days, losing eight Mustangs in combat but recording its first 22 aerial victories. Attacks intensified as Berlin was bombed by the USAAF for the first time in March, with the group shooting down 20 fighters during the first major raid on 6 March. The 364th Fighter Squadron led the group in aerial victories, with 32 by the end of March, and with two pilots claiming ace status on 16 March.

In its first month of operations, the 357th flew 15 missions, losing 14 P-51s but credited with 59 kills. On an escort mission to Bordeaux, France, on 5 March, the 357th lost two aircraft. Group commander Col. Henry Spicer was captured while the French Resistance aided Flight Officer Charles E. Yeager in evading capture for 25 days. He successfully escaped to Spain, where he remained six weeks before being returned to Allied control.

==== Camouflage, unit markings and call signs ====
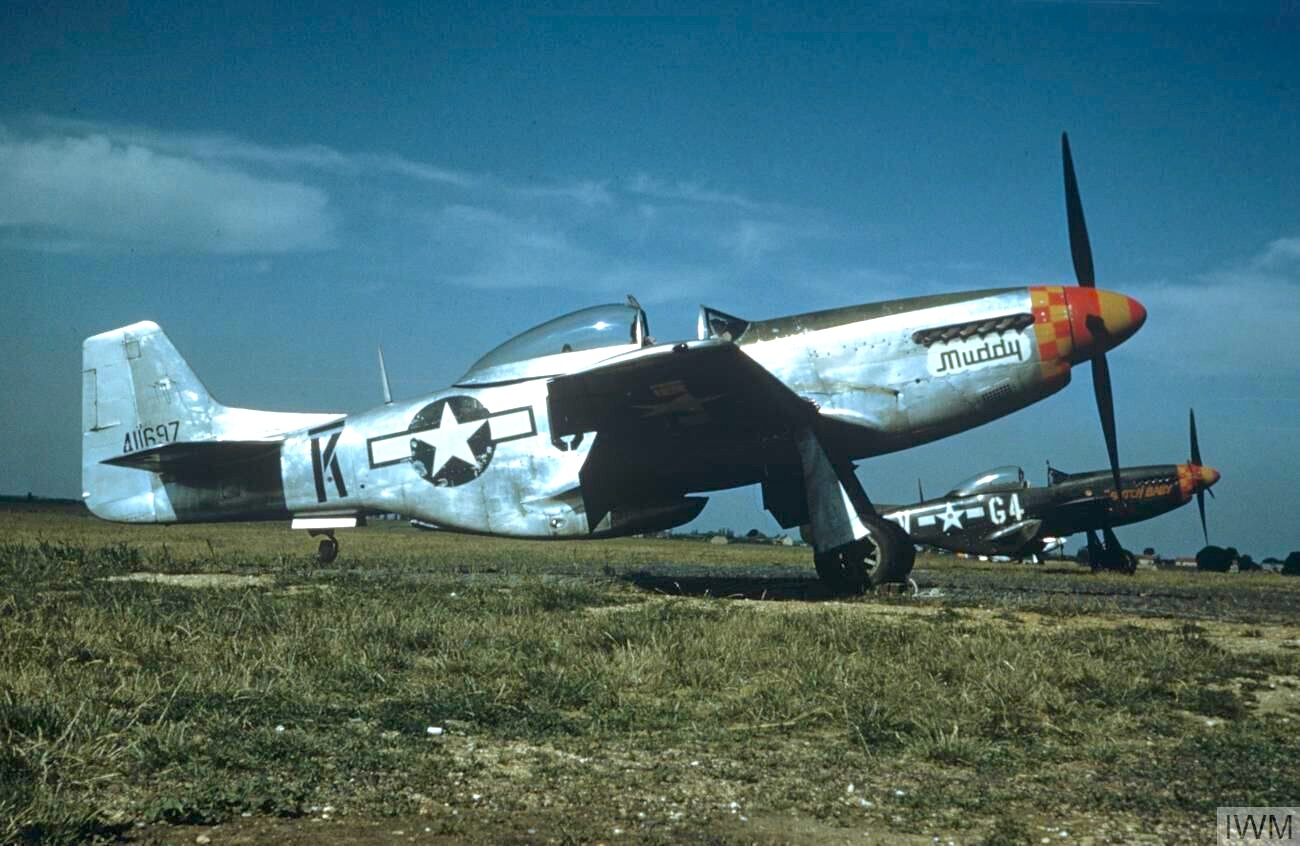
North American P-51K Mustang Muddy, 44–11697, G4-K (foreground, assigned to 2nd Lt. James Gasser) and P-51D Butch Baby 44–14798, G4-V (background, 2nd Lt. Julian .H. Bertram). G4-V was formerly Master Mike, the mount of Major Joe Broadhead, 362 FS CO. Taken at RAF Steeple Morden in April 1945

The initial group of P-51B aircraft received by the 357 FG were finished in factory-applied olive drab with gray lower surfaces. The USAAF in a major policy change had ended this specification on all aircraft produced after 13 February 1944. The 357th applied field camouflage to its replacement P-51C (beginning in March) and P-51D (beginning in June) fighters until December 1944, with most receiving an overall coat of "RAF green" (a shade similar to olive drab) with gray undersurfaces, but a prominent minority being bare metal with olive drab tails and upper surfaces. This practice distinguished 357th Mustangs from those of the other Eighth Air Force groups until 1945 when the camouflage was phased out.

In February 1944, VIII Fighter Command assigned the 357th Fighter Group two-letter squadron identification codes to be painted on the fuselages of its fighters, and each squadron assigned its aircraft individual letter identifiers. The Eighth Air Force had in January given veteran units permission to use brightly colored spinners and identification bands on the engine cowls of their fighters. In late March, the 66th Fighter Wing adopted colored spinners and a checkerboard paint scheme to be painted as an identifying cowl band on the noses of its aircraft, with each of its five groups assigned a different color. These bands were 12 inches (300 mm) wide with six-inch (152 mm) squares. The 357th's group nose colors were red and yellow, and many nose art names were also painted in matching colors. In late 1944 the 357th began to discontinue the use of olive drab camouflage and adopted a color system painted on the tail rudders of its Mustangs to identify the squadron.

On 23 April 1944, VIII Fighter Command changed its system of radio call signs to reduce confusion when the fighter groups, now numbering a hundred or more fighters in their inventories, deployed two groups on escort missions ("A group" and "B Group"). Station call signs (RAF Leiston's was EARLDUKE) were unchanged, but all previous call signs were discontinued. In 1945 provision was also made for a C Group on missions (usually only eight to 12 fighters) and all fighters assigned to a C Group mission used the common call sign.

Operations Identification Data

	362d Fighter Sqdn	363d Fighter Sqdn	364th Fighter Sqdn	
Squadron Code	G4	B6	C5	
Rudder color	white but not applied	red	yellow	
Radio call signs	362d FS	363d FS	364th FS	Group
prior to 23 April 1944	JUDSON	CHAMBERS	GOWDY	RIGHTFIELD
A Group	Dollar	Cement	Greenhouse	Dryden
B Group	Roundtree	Diver	Hawkeye	Silas
C Group	--	--	--	Eyesight

Like all Allied aircraft flying over the continent, the 357th applied alternating 18-inch (460 mm), black and white bands, known as "invasion stripes", to the rear fuselage and wings of its fighters just prior to D-Day. It retained the lower wing stripes and lower portion of the rear fuselage until the end of 1944, when most invasion stripes were deleted. SOURCES: The basic source is Freeman, but Olmsted and Little Friends website have identical data

==== Invasion preparation and support ====
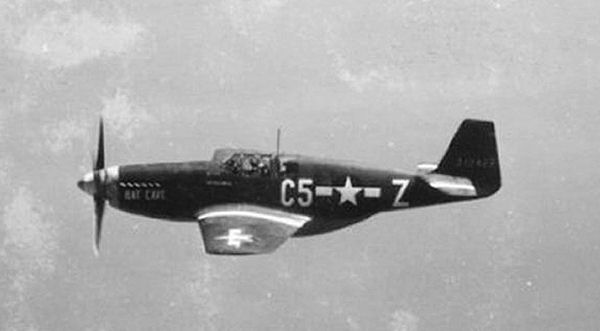
P-51B 43-12123 C5-Z Bat Cave, assigned to Capt. Charles D. Sumner, 364 FS, credited with 4.5 kills

Because of the extended range of the P-51, the primary mission of the 357th continued to be heavy bomber escort. On 11 April 1944, 917 heavy bombers and 819 escort fighters of the Eighth Air Force attacked aviation industry targets in Saxony-Anhalt resulting in a severe fighter reaction by the Jagdverbände. A total of 64 bombers were shot down in one of the heaviest losses to the Eighth, but strong escort support kept the losses from being worse. Three Mustangs from the 364th Fighter Squadron were also shot down but the group as a whole was credited with 23 of the 51 aerial victories scored. Another 22 were credited during the 24 April operations against Bavarian airfields and aircraft factories, with 70 total for the month resulting in eight additional aces in the group. While scoring 174 kills in April and May 1944, the 357th also lost 33 Mustangs.

Beginning in late February 1944, Eighth Air Force fighter units began systematic strafing attacks on German airfields that picked up in frequency and intensity throughout the spring (as example, on the above-mentioned missions VIII Fighter Command scored 130 strafing kills in addition to 109 aerial victories) with the objective of gaining air supremacy over the Normandy battlefield. In general these were conducted by units returning from escort missions, but many groups also were assigned airfield attacks instead of bomber support. On 21 May, these attacks were expanded to include railways, locomotives and rolling stock used by the Germans for movements of matériel and troops in missions dubbed "Chattanooga", . The 357th lost two of its aces in combat when their Mustangs were shot down by flak.

On D-Day, the group flew eight missions and nearly 130 sorties, and, thereafter, multiple daily missions over the beachhead. The group also performed its first bombing missions using the Mustang in June. It encountered few German aircraft during the month until 29 June, when on a mission to Leipzig it shot down 20. For its actions over Berlin on 6 March and the Leipzig mission the group was awarded a Distinguished Unit Citation.

The 357th also began receiving new P-51D Mustangs as replacement aircraft but many pilots preferred the earlier B models still prevalent in the group as being more maneuverable and better-powered at high altitude. By the end of June 1944, the 357th had claimed 283 German aircraft shot down and counted 26 pilots recognized as aces. Losses over its initial four months of combat amounted to 27 killed or missing in action, 30 captured and 72 P-51s destroyed.

==== Operations in the summer and fall of 1944 ====
In July 1944, the K-14, an improved gyroscopic gunsight of British design, reached the 357th for replacement of the existing N-3B reflector sights in the P-51B and C. The K-14 allowed for rapid, accurate lead-computing of up to 90° deflection by analog computer with pilot inputs through hand controls. However, the sights were sized for the cockpits of older Mustangs, now constituting less than a third of the 357th's strength. Group commander Col. Donald Graham directed the 469th Service Squadron to mount a K-14 in his assigned P-51D (44-13388 B6-W Bodacious) to replace its N-9 reflector sight, using bracing and panel cutouts to form a recess. Testing the sights in combat in September, the K-14 proved so effective that Graham offered the installation method to other Eighth Air Force groups for retro-fitting the gunsight into all D-model Mustangs in the field, with the 357th method adopted in March 1945 by the Eighth Air Force Modification Center.

The 357th flew escort for the second shuttle-bombing mission by the Eighth Air Force, "Frantic V", on 6 August 1944. Escorting two B-17 groups of the 13th Combat Bomb Wing to bomb a Focke-Wulf manufacturing plant in Rahmel, West Prussia, 64 Mustangs of the group continued on to the Soviet Union, landing at Piryatin airfield, a P-39/Yak-3 fighter strip southeast of Kiev, Ukraine, while the bombers, carrying 357th maintenance crews, continued further east to Mirgorod. The next day, the Mustangs escorted the B-17s against synthetic oil production plants in Trzebinia, Poland, returning to Piryatin, and on 8 August, escorted them to Foggia, Italy, bombing Romanian airfields en route. Temporarily based at San Severo with the 31st Fighter Group, the 357th supported a C-47 mission to Yugoslavia on 10 August to evacuate Allied evaders and escaped POWs. On 12 August 1944, the entire Frantic force returned to England, attacking German lines of communication in Toulouse, France, as part of the preparation for the invasion of Southern France.

Large-scale combat between VIII Fighter Command and the Luftwaffe interceptor force had become virtually nonexistent after 28 May 1944 but, in August, contact was made for the first time with both rocket-propelled and jet-propelled interceptors. While themselves a harbinger of a tactical change by the Luftwaffe, the contacts also indicated that the Germans were husbanding their fighter aircraft for sporadic reaction against Allied bomber attacks. The 357th, escorting B-17s against oil targets near Munich, encountered one such reaction on 13 September, engaging 75 Messerschmitt Bf 109s and claiming 15 shot down, but losing five Mustangs.

On 15 September, operational control of VIII Fighter Command's three fighter wings was placed directly under the headquarters of the bomb divisions, removing a layer of command, with a wing controlled by each division. After this date, the 357th Fighter Group's primary duty was protection of the B-17s of the 3rd Bomb Division based in East Anglia. In September, the simplified mission planning, along with the adoption of the K-14 gyro sight and the issuance of air-inflatable Berger G-suit to pilots came at a time when numerous veteran pilots were completing their combat tours. Although a significant number of aces opted to fly second tours after taking leave in the United States, these innovations helped the group absorb the pilot turnover without significant loss of combat efficiency.

The Luftwaffe also reacted with a massed response against the airborne invasion of the Netherlands. On the afternoon of 18 September, German fighters attacked a large re-supply effort of Arnhem by Eighth Air Force B-24 bombers. The 357th intercepted a force of 60 Bf 109s near Maastricht, claiming 26 destroyed.The next afternoon the Allies used over 600 transports for airlift in marginal weather conditions, some of which were attacked by numerous German fighters, including Bf 109s of Jadgeschwaders (fighter wings) 11 and 26. The 357th "bounced" the interceptors as they left the battlefield northeast of Arnhem, shooting down 25 (although five were not credited until after the war when repatriated POWs were debriefed). Against their 51 claims, the 357th lost seven Mustangs, with three pilots killed and three captured.

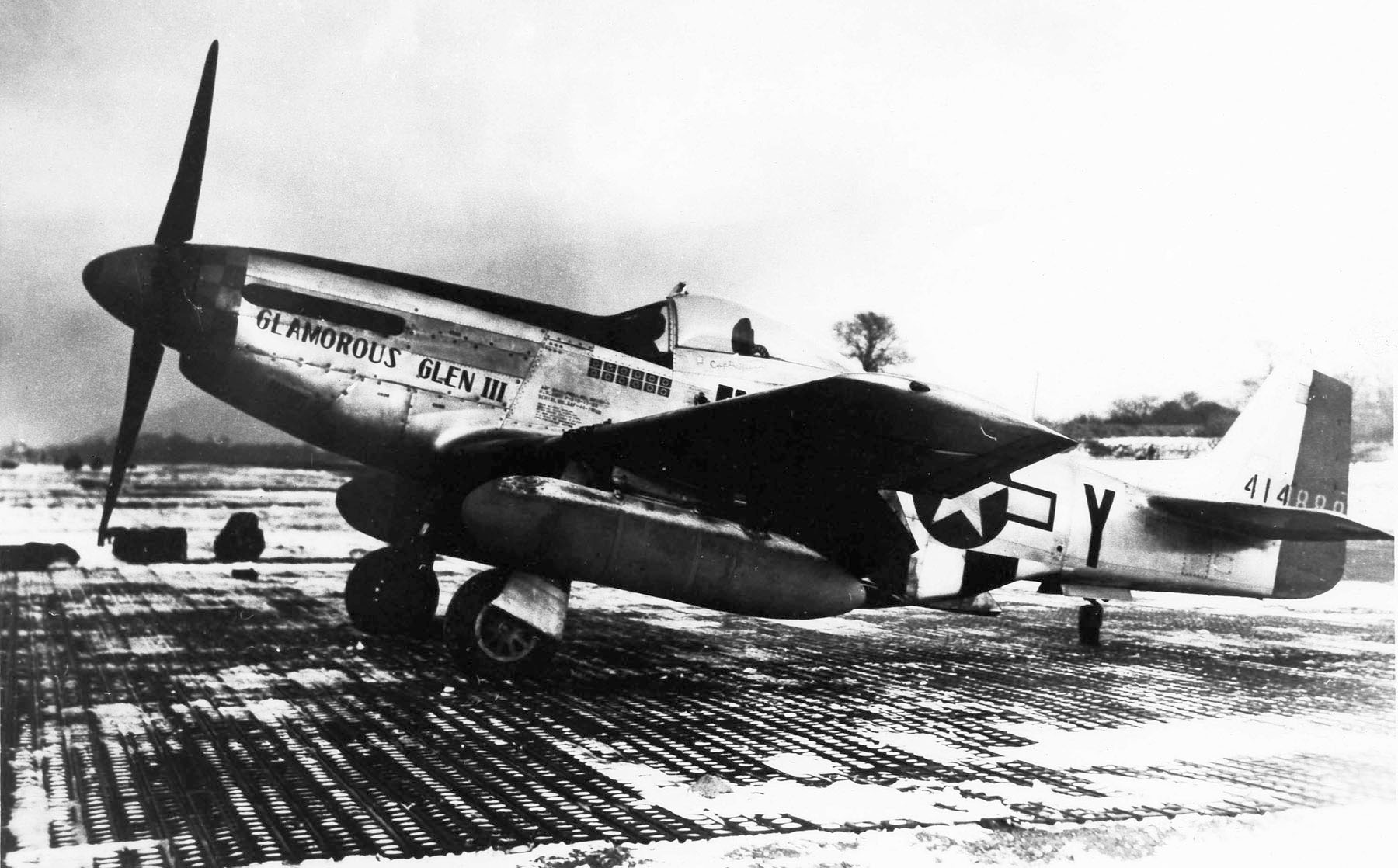
P-51D 44-14888 B6-Y Glamorous Glen III, personally assigned aircraft of Capt. Chuck Yeager, 363rd FS, whom he named after his wife. After Yeager was reassigned, this aircraft was renamed "Melody's Answer" and was lost 2 March 1945.

Air-to-air contacts declined in the following month, but one notable combat occurred during an escort mission to Bremen on 12 October 1944, when 1st Lt. Chuck Yeager claimed five German fighters to become an "Ace in a day", and the group scored its 400th kill. Yeager had been with the group since its inception but had only been credited with 1.5 kills to that point. Assigned as mission leader, Yeager observed 22 Bf 109s of III./JG 26 crossing his flight path at the same altitude and attacked. Yeager's feat was unique in that the first two German pilots abandoned their aircraft as he closed the range but before he opened fire.

On 6 November 1944, Yeager also claimed one of the first Me 262 jet aircraft shot down, when after a series of skirmishes with three jets in thick haze over Osnabrück, he encountered one attempting a landing and blew off its wing. Two days later, 357th pilots again engaged the Kommando Nowotny. 1st Lt. Edward R. "Buddy" Haydon shared a jet credit in which the German commander, Major Walter Nowotny, was killed, and 1st Lt. James W. Kenney shot down Hauptmann Franz Schall.

The Jagdverbände made three concerted attempts to attack Eighth Air Force bombers between 21 and 27 November 1944, and on the last generated an estimated 750 fighter sorties, the largest defensive reaction of the war. The three fighter wings of the Eighth used a tactical ruse to score a significant victory. Assigning 13 groups to a fighter-bomber mission, P-51s and P-47s simulated heavy bomber formations while other P-51s flew escort patterns above them. The resulting radar contact triggered the heavy fighter reaction near Magdeburg, and the force was directed towards them by a microwave early warning (MEW) site ("Nuthouse") at Gulpen, Netherlands.

In the 66th Fighter Wing, the 353d and 357th Fighter Groups engaged approximately 200 Fw 190s of JG 300 and JG 301, with the 353d downing 22 and the 357th, 30 in the ensuing combats. Captain Leonard K. "Kit" Carson, on the 38th mission of his second tour and having nine previous credits, became the second 357th pilot to become an "ace in a day", while Yeager and Capt John B. England claimed four kills each. One week later, on 5 December, the 357th escorted 3rd Division bombers to Berlin and encountered 100 more German fighters, claiming 22 against a loss of two.

==== Winter operations and jet combat ====
Fog and ice conditions grounded the P-51s for much of December 1944, but during the German Ardennes offensive the Eighth Air Force conducted the largest single operation in its history on 24 December, dispatching 2,046 bombers and 853 fighters to attack lines of communication and airfields in Germany. The 357th Fighter Group launched a total of 76 Mustangs split into an "A" group of 25 led by group commander Lt.Col. Irwin Dregne and a "B" group of 51 led by Major Richard Peterson. Each group engaged large numbers of German fighters of JG 300 near Fulda and the 357th as a whole shot down 30 more, losing three including a P-51 that collided with a 55th Fighter Group Mustang.

In the first two weeks of January 1945 the 357th along with all Eighth Air Force groups supported bomber attacks against German ground transportation during the Allied counter-offensive in the Ardennes, strafing ground targets daily. However, on 14 January, strategic bombing resumed with attacks on oil installations near Berlin. The 357th was tasked with protecting 3rd Air Division B-17s, employing a variation of the escort tactic called the "Zemke Fan", designed to lure in interceptors. Sending 66 Mustangs including spares, the 364 FS led the mission flying ahead of the bombers at 26,000 feet (7,900 m), the 362nd flew close escort over the lead combat box of bombers while the 363d flew farther back over the third box at higher altitude.

Near Brandenburg, the 357th observed the contrails of more than 200 fighters approaching the lead bomber combat box from the southeast. The heavily armored "sturmgruppen" Fw 190s of II/JG 300 attacked the B-17s in "company front" formations of eight abreast, while a protective force of 100 Bf 109s of JG 300's other three gruppen attempted to cover them from 32,000. The 364 FS attacked and broke up the sturmgruppen formations, which were pursued by the trailing 363rd FS. The German top cover attempted to enter the mêlée and were intercepted by the 362 FS, quickly joined by the 364th. The 30-minute battle resulted in 56.5 German fighters claimed as shot down, by far the largest single day kill of the war by an Eighth Air Force group.

Including the victories of group staff flying with various squadrons, the 364th is credited with 23.5 kills, the 362d with 20, and the 363rd with 12. Ironically, two of the most prolific aces of the 363rd FS, Capt. Bud Anderson and Capt. Chuck Yeager, had been assigned to the mission but scored no kills. On the last mission of their second tours, they were sent as spares and broke away before contact to make an impromptu farewell tour of Europe that included buzzing neutral Switzerland and Paris, France. Even so, the mission resulted in five more aces for the 357th (Dregne, Evans, Maxwell, Sublett and Weaver) and immediate recognition of the feat by Eighth Air Force commanding General Jimmy Doolittle. The group received its second Distinguished Unit Citation for the mission.

In the four major combats of 27 November, 2 December, 24 December and 14 January, the 357th Fighter Group claimed 137.5 aircraft against a loss of nine Mustangs. The 357th had two more large-scale engagements with German fighters before the end of the war. On 2 March 1945, escorting B-17s to Ruhland, the group encountered its frequent foes JGs 300 and 301 a final time, shooting down 14 and losing one Mustang. On the way back to base, strafing airfields, the group had an additional four P-51s shot down by flak, with two pilots killed. On 24 March, flying an area patrol near Gütersloh to protect the Allied airborne crossing of the Rhine, it encountered 20 Bf 109s of JG 27 and shot down 16 without loss.

The Jagdverbände, severely depleted, turned to jet interceptions beginning 9 February 1945, in an attempt to stop the onslaught of Allied heavy bombers. The Allies countered by flying combat air patrol missions over German airfields, intercepting the Me 262s and Ar 234s as they took off and landed. The tactic resulted in increasing numbers of jets shot down and controlled the dangerous situation, particularly as the amount of German-controlled territory shrank daily. The 357th claimed an additional 12.5 jets destroyed during this period to total 18.5 for the war, and destroyed three others on the ground. The 357th flew its 313th and final combat mission on 25 April 1945, without contact or loss.

=== Casualties ===
357th FG losses
128	P-51's lost in combat
26	P-51's lost in accidents
45	Pilots killed in action
13	Pilots killed in accidents
15	Pilots missing in action
54	Pilots captured
3	Pilots interned

A total of 128 P-51s were lost in combat by the 357th Fighter Group. Sixty pilots were killed or missing in action, 54 were made prisoners of war with two of those dying in captivity and 13 evaded capture to return to duty.(The additional two casualties were a pilot killed and a squadron commander made POW while flying with the 354th FG in January 1944). Three other pilots landed in neutral territory and were interned.

Twenty-six Mustangs were destroyed in operational and training accidents in the UK, as was an AT-6. A total of 13 pilots and a mechanic were killed, three of whom died after cessation of combat operations. Of the 128 combat losses, 38 were attributed to attack by German fighters, 29 to flak, ten to mid-air collisions, 21 to mechanical causes (mostly engine failure), five to friendly fire, five to bad weather and 20 to causes not determined.

== Honors and campaigns ==

Distinguished Unit Citation

- Berlin, 6 March 1944 and Leipzig, 29 June 1944
- Derben, 14 January 1945

World War II:

- Air Offensive, Europe
- Normandy
- Northern France
- Rhineland
- Ardennes-Alsace
- Central Europe

== Aerial victories ==
The first aerial victory by a 357th pilot occurred 20 February 1944, with the downing of a Bf 109 by 1st Lt. Calvert L. Williams, 362d Fighter Squadron, flying P-51B 43-6448 (G4-U Wee Willie). The final victory was an Me 262 shot down on 19 April 1945, by 2d Lt James P. McMullen, 364th Fighter Squadron.

The 357th Fighter Group had 609 1/2 claims credited by the Eighth Air Force for German aircraft destroyed in air-to-air combat. U.S. Air Force Historical Study No. 85 recognizes 595.49 aerial victories for the 357th. This total is the third highest among USAAF fighter groups in the ETO (behind the 354th and 56th Fighter Groups), the second highest among Eighth Air Force groups, and the highest among the 14 P-51 groups of VIII Fighter Command. Eighth Air Force also credited the 357th Fighter Group with 106 1/2 German aircraft destroyed on the ground, making an overall total of 701.99, which is sixth among all Eighth Air Force fighter groups. Of the air-to-air totals, 18 1/2 were Me 262 jets, the most destroyed in aerial combat by any USAAF group.

Among the various units of the 357th, the 364th Fighter Squadron had the most victories with 70 pilots credited with 212 kills. The 362d Fighter Squadron was credited with 198 kills by 63 pilots, the 363d Fighter Squadron with 154.99 kills by 50 pilots, and group headquarters with 30.5 kills by nine pilots.

Counting only air-to-air victories registered while with the group (therefore discounting air-to-ground claims), the 357th had 42 pilots become aces, the most of any ETO fighter group (the 354th Fighter Group of the Ninth Air Force also had 42, the 56th Fighter Group had 39 and the 4th Fighter Group 32 by the same criteria).

=== Aces of the 357th Fighter Group ===
Pilot	Squadron	Credits	Casualty Status and date	Aircraft Flown
Major Leonard K. "Kit" Carson	362d	18.5		Nooky Booky and three successors
Major John B. England	362d	17.5		U've Had It, Missouri Armada
Major Clarence E. "Bud" Anderson	363d	16.25		Old Crow
Major Richard A. "Pete" Peterson	364th	15.5		Hurry Home Honey
Major Robert W. Foy	363d-Grp	15¹		Reluctant Rebel, Little Shrimp
Major Donald H. Bochkay	363d	13.75²		Speedball Alice, Alice in Wonderland
1st Lt John A. Kirla	362d	11.5		Spook
Capt. Charles E. "Chuck" Yeager	363d	11.5¹		Glamorous Glen and two successors
Lt Col John A. Storch	364th	10.5		The Shillelagh
Capt Fletcher E. Adams	362d	9	Killed in action 30 May 1944	Southern Belle
Lt Col Thomas L. "Tommy" Hayes	Group	8.5¹		Frenesi
2d Lt Otto D. "Dittie" Jenkins	362d	8.5	Died flying accident 24 March 1945	Floogie, Toolin' Tool, Toolin' Fool's Revenge
Major Joseph E. Broadhead	362d	8		Baby Mike, Master Mike
1st Lt Robert M. Shaw	364th	8		
Capt John L. Sublett	362d	8		Lady Ovella
Capt Charles E. Weaver	362d	8¹		Passion Wagon
1st Lt Dale E. Karger	364th	7.5¹		Karger's Dollie, Cathy Mae II
Capt Glendon V. Davis	364th	7.5		Pregnant Polecat
Capt Robert H. Becker	362d	7		Sebastian, Sebastian, Jr.
Capt James W. Browning	363d	7	Killed in action 9 February 1945	Gentleman Jim and two successors
1st Lt John B. Carder	364th	7	Prisoner of war 12 May 1944	Taxpayer's Delight
1st Lt Gilbert M. O'Brien	362d	7		Shanty Irish
1st Lt Joseph F. Pierce	363d	7	Killed in action 21 May 1944	
1st Lt Gerald E. Tyler	364th	7		Little Duckfoot
Lt Col Andrew J. Evans	Group	6		Little Sweetie and three successors
Capt. Alva C. Murphy	362d	6	Killed in action 2 March 1945	Bite Me
Capt William R. O'Brien	363d	6		Billy's Bitch
Capt. John F. Pugh	362d	6		Geronimo
Major Arval J. Roberson	362d	6		Passion Wagon
Capt. Robert G. Schimanski	364th	6		Anne Lou
2d Lt Frank L. Gailer	363d	5.5	Prisoner of war 27 November 1944	Expectant, Jeesil Peesil Mommy
Capt. Paul R. "Shorty" Hatala	364th	5.5		Jeanne, Nellie Jean
1st Lt LeRoy A. Ruder	364th	5.5	Killed in action 6 June 1944	Linda Lu
1st Lt Robert P. Winks	364th	5.5¹		Trusty Rusty
Capt Raymond M. Bank	364th	5	Prisoner of war 2 March 1945	Fire Ball
Lt Col Irwin H. Dregne	Group	5		Bobby Jeanne / Ah Fung-Goo
Capt Thomas L. "Little Red" Harris	364th	5	Prisoner of war 22 May 1944	L'il Red's Rocket
Major Edwin W. Hiro	363d	5	Killed in action 18 September 1944	Horses Itch
Capt Chester K. Maxwell	364th	5		Lady Esther
1st Lt William C. Reese	364th	5	Killed in action 21 May 1944	Bear River Betsy
1st Lt Morris A. Stanley	364th	5		
Capt. Jack R. "Walrus" Warren	364th	5	Missing in action 18 March 1944	
Major Raymond Matt Bank	364th	5		Fireball

Source: Olmsted 1994, p. 148. He in turn used AF Historical Study 85. ^{1}Totals include one Me 262 jet shot down. ^{2}Totals include two Me 262 jets shot down.

== Postwar history and heritage ==
In July 1945, the 357th Fighter Group moved to Neubiberg Air Base in Bavaria as part of the Allied Occupation forces and was inactivated there in 1946, with group aircraft and personnel assigned to the 33rd Fighter Group.

The 357th Fighter Group was re-designated the 121st Fighter Group on 21 August 1946 and allotted to the Ohio National Guard; it was later allocated to the Ohio Air National Guard upon its creation in 1947. The official site of the Ohio Air National Guard notes that the OHANG is "descended from the 357th Fighter Group".

== 357th Fighter Group P-51 survivors and replicas ==
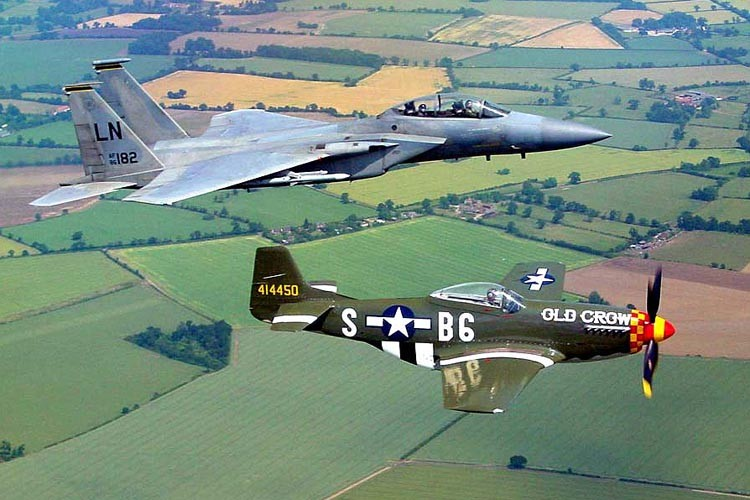
Old Crow, the aircraft of Capt. Clarence E. "Bud" Anderson, 363rd FS, with an F-15D at RAF Lakenheath in July 2001

Old Crow (P-51D-10-NA 44-14450 B6-S), 363rd Fighter Squadron, survived World War II and is now in private ownership in Sweden. Originally the Mustang flew in olive drab camouflage, but in late 1944, was stripped to a bare metal finish, although its black-and-white "invasion stripes" remained on the bottom of the rear fuselage. The plane has been restored by its owner in its OD paint scheme and is based in Belgium.

A number of private owners of P-51s have restored their Mustangs in 357th livery for display at air shows and private exhibitions. Most are P-51Ds produced too late to see combat and declared surplus, or models that served in the Royal Canadian Air Force in the 1950s, although the Mustang restored as Frenesi was first an F-6K photographic reconnaissance model. Among Mustangs restored to resemble 357th aircraft are:

Nickname	serial	Sqd	Codes	357 Pilot	Replica	Owner	Location	Civil r/n	scheme¹	status
Old Crow	414450	363	B6-S	Capt. Bud Anderson	473877	Scandinavian Historic Flight	Copenhagen–Roskilde Airport, Denmark	unk	NMF	Flying
do	do		do	do	unknown	Fantasy of Flight	Polk City, Florida	unk	NMF	Static
do	do		do	do	473877	private individual	Oslo, Norway	N167F	OD	unk
do	do		do	do	474774	Old Crow LLC	Willow Run Airport, Michigan	N6341T	NMF	Flying
Gentleman Jim	414937	363	B6-P	Capt. Jim Browning	474230	Jack Roush LLC	Willow Run Airport, Michigan	N551J	NMF	Flying
Glamorous Glen III	414888	363	B6-Y	Capt. Chuck Yeager	463893	private individual	Uvalde, Texas	N3333E	NMF	unk
Nooky Booky IV	411622	362	G4-C	Maj. Kit Carson	474427	private individual	Nîmes, France	F-AZSB	NMF	Flying
Frenesi	413318	364	C5-N	Lt.Col. Tom Hayes	412852	private individual	Philadelphia, Pennsylvania	N357FG	OD	Flying
Mormon Mustang	722579	364	C5-T	Brig. Gen. Roland R. Wright	unknown	John Bagley	Rexburg, Idaho	N551BJ	NMF	Flying
Ain't Misbehavin	415267	362	G4-M	Capt. Jesse R Frey	4474009	Billy Strickland/Wes Stowers	Birmingham, AL	unk	NMF	Flying
Hurry Home Honey	413586	364	C5-T	Maj. Pete Peterson	473206	Mojo Aerospace	Lexington, Kentucky	N3751D	NMF	Yes
Trusty Rusty	413578	364	C5-W	1st Lt Robert P. Winks	413578	Early Birds Foundation	Lelystad, Netherlands	PH-JAT	NMF	Flying

^{1}OD=Olive Drab, NMF=Natural Metal Finish
