= John D. Landers =

American double ace fighter pilot

John Dave Landers
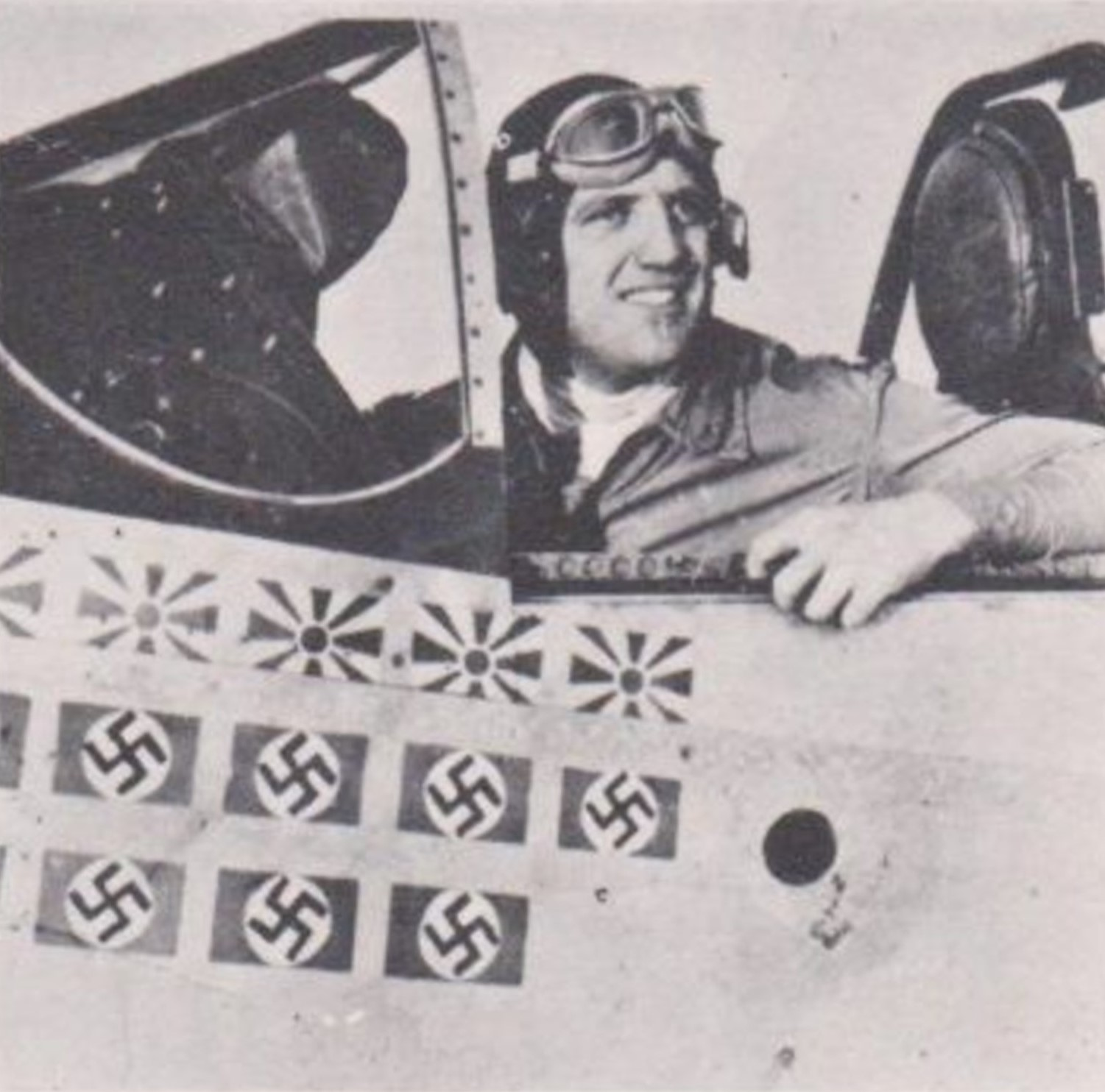
- Born: August 23, 1920; Wilson, Oklahoma
- Died: September 12, 1989 (aged 69); Granbury, Texas
- Burial place: Greenwood Memorial Park
- Military career
- Allegiance: United States of America
- Branch: United States Army Air Corps; United States Army Air Forces
- Service years: 1941–1945
- Rank: Colonel
- Nickname: Jack
- Units: 49th Pursuit Group; 78th Fighter Group; 357th Fighter Group
- Commands: 38th Fighter Squadron; 78th Fighter Group; 357th Fighter Group; 361st Fighter Group
- Conflicts: World War II
- Awards: Silver Star (3); Distinguished Flying Cross (4); Purple Heart; Air Medal (22)

John Dave Landers (August 23, 1920 – September 12, 1989) was a colonel in the United States Army Air Forces. He flew with the 9th Fighter Squadron in the Pacific commanded the 357th Fighter Group and the 78th Fighter Group during World War II. Credited with 14.5 aerial victories, he earned flying ace status in both the Pacific and European theatres.

== Early life ==
Landers was born on August 23, 1920, in Wilson, Oklahoma, to Obadiah Ray Landers and Mamie Legal Martin Landers. By 1938, he had relocated to Johnson County, Texas, and was employed by the Lone Star Gas Company.

== Military career ==
With World War II ongoing, Landers entered the Aviation Cadet Program of the U.S. Army Air Corps on April 25, 1941, and was commissioned a second lieutenant and awarded his pilot wings at Stockton Field, California, on December 12, 1941, just five days after the Attack on Pearl Harbor.

=== World War II ===
By January 1942, Landers was posted to the 9th Fighter Squadron of the 49th Fighter Group in Australia, flying the Curtiss P-40 Warhawk. He named his P-40, “Texas Longhorn”. With only 10 flying hours, he embarked on his first combat missions over the Pacific.

=== Pacific theater ===
During his second sortie that, Landers would get his first kill. His flight of 12 aircraft were dispatched to intercept an enemy flight near Darwin, Australia. Soon into the flight, his P-40 began to experience engine problems and Landers began to fall behind his formation.

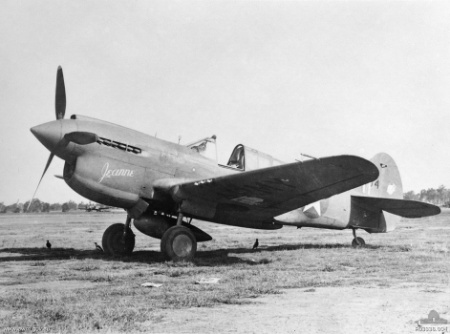
P-40E of the 49th Fighter Group

He spotted a flight of seven Japanese bombers with fighter escort 2000 feet below him and decided to dive in on them. With one of the bombers in target, he pulled the trigger and claimed his first victory. With his aircraft damaged by the escorting A6M Zero fighters, he managed to catch up with his flight to shoot down a second bomber of the engagement.

With 6 kills to his credit and now a flying ace, Landers was shot down over Papua New Guinea, but managed to escape from the jungle with help from some of the local population. He was returned to the US in January 1943 and assigned a training role, but he missed combat. So he applied for an active duty posting.

=== European theater ===
After completing Lockheed P-38 Lightning conversion training, Landers was assigned to the 38th Fighter Squadron of the 55th Fighter Group at RAF Wormingford in April 1944. Landers continued to score aerial victories against Focke-Wulf Fw 190s and Messerschmitt Me 410s over France and Germany, first in the P-38 and then in the North American P-51D Mustang after the 55th FG converted in July 1944.

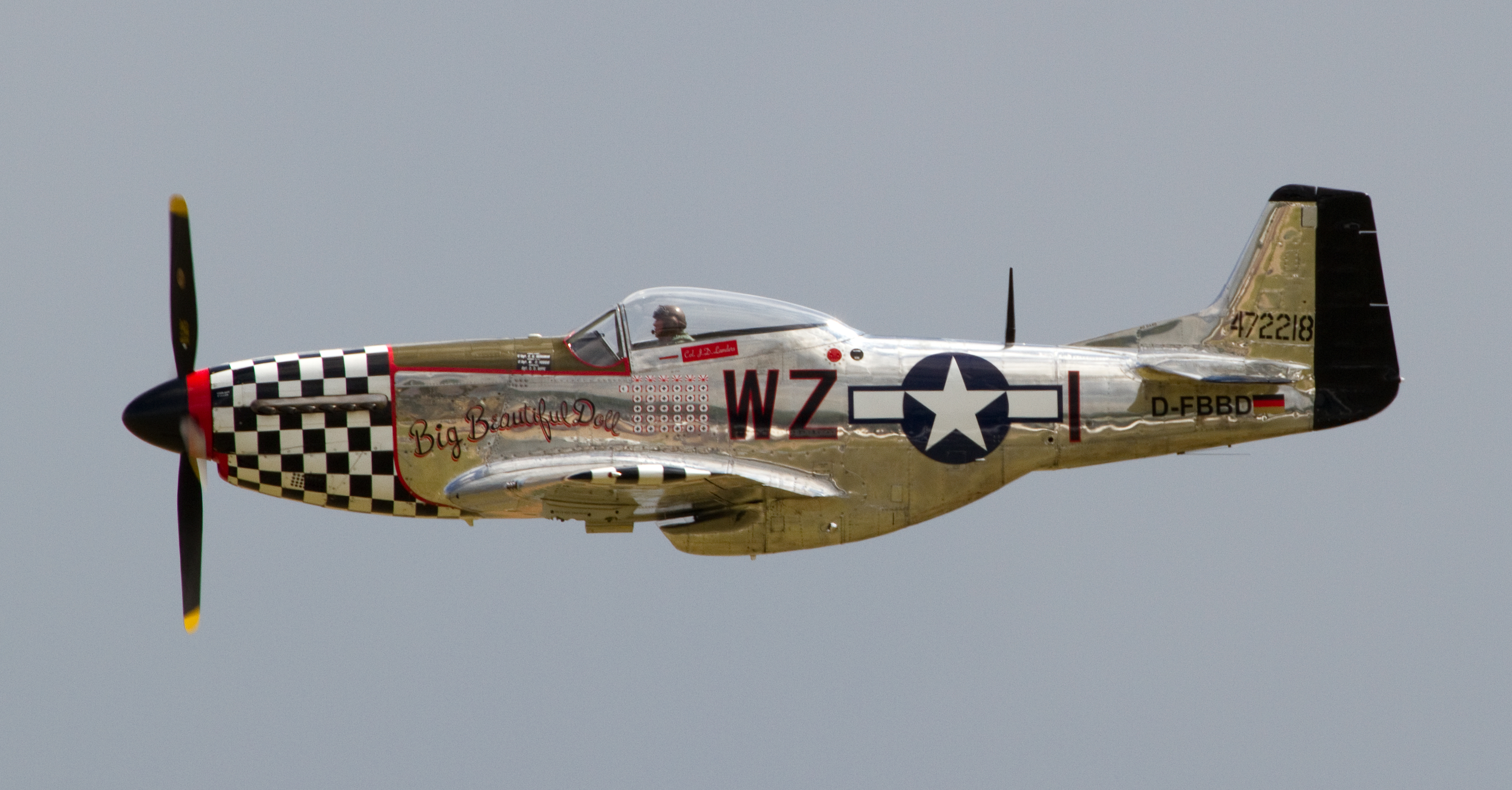
Replica of Landers' aircraft

Promoted from captain to major, he took command of the 38th FS. During this time, he flew on what is regarded as the longest fighter escort mission. His flight accompanied heavy bombers on a 1,600-mile sortie over Poland and spent approximately 7 hours in flight. While with the 38th FS, he destroyed an additional two enemy aircraft and damaged one in aerial combat.

Newly promoted to lieutenant colonel, Landers was temporarily assigned as commanding officer of the 357th Fighter Group between October and December 1944 at RAF Leiston. Landers also destroyed one enemy aircraft while flying with the 357th. He returned to the U.S. in December 1944 and returned to Europe in February 1945.

In February 1945, Landers took command of the 78th Fighter Group at RAF Duxford. He was credited with destroying another 3.5 enemy aircraft in the air, including a shared victory over a Messerschmitt Me 262 jet fighter. From July 1945 until the war's end, he commanded the 361st Fighter Group until his return to the U.S. in October 1945.

Landers left active duty in December 1945. During the war, Landers was credited with destroying 14.5 and damaging 1 enemy aircraft in aerial combat and destroying 20 more on the ground while strafing enemy airfields. He flew several P-38 Lightning and P-51 Mustang aircraft that were named "Big Beautiful Doll."

== Later life ==
After the war, he worked in construction management for many years. Landers moved to Granbury, Texas in 1979. In one of his last public appearances, he gave a presentation before a meeting of the Granbury Radio Control Airplane Club and talked about some of his experiences in 1988.

Landers died in Granbury, Texas, on September 12, 1989, at the age of 69, and was interred at Greenwood Mausoleum.

== Awards and decorations ==
His awards include:

Army Air Forces Pilot Badge

Silver Star with two bronze oak leaf clusters
Distinguished Flying Cross with three bronze oak leaf clusters
Purple Heart
Air Medal with four silver leaf clusters
Air Medal (second ribbon required for accouterment spacing)
Air Force Presidential Unit Citation with two bronze oak leaf clusters
American Defense Service Medal
American Campaign Medal
Asiatic-Pacific Campaign Medal with three bronze campaign stars
European-African-Middle Eastern Campaign Medal with four bronze campaign stars
World War II Victory Medal
Army of Occupation Medal with 'Germany' clasp
Croix de Guerre with Palm (France)
