= Henry R. Spicer =

United States Air Force general

Henry Russell Spicer
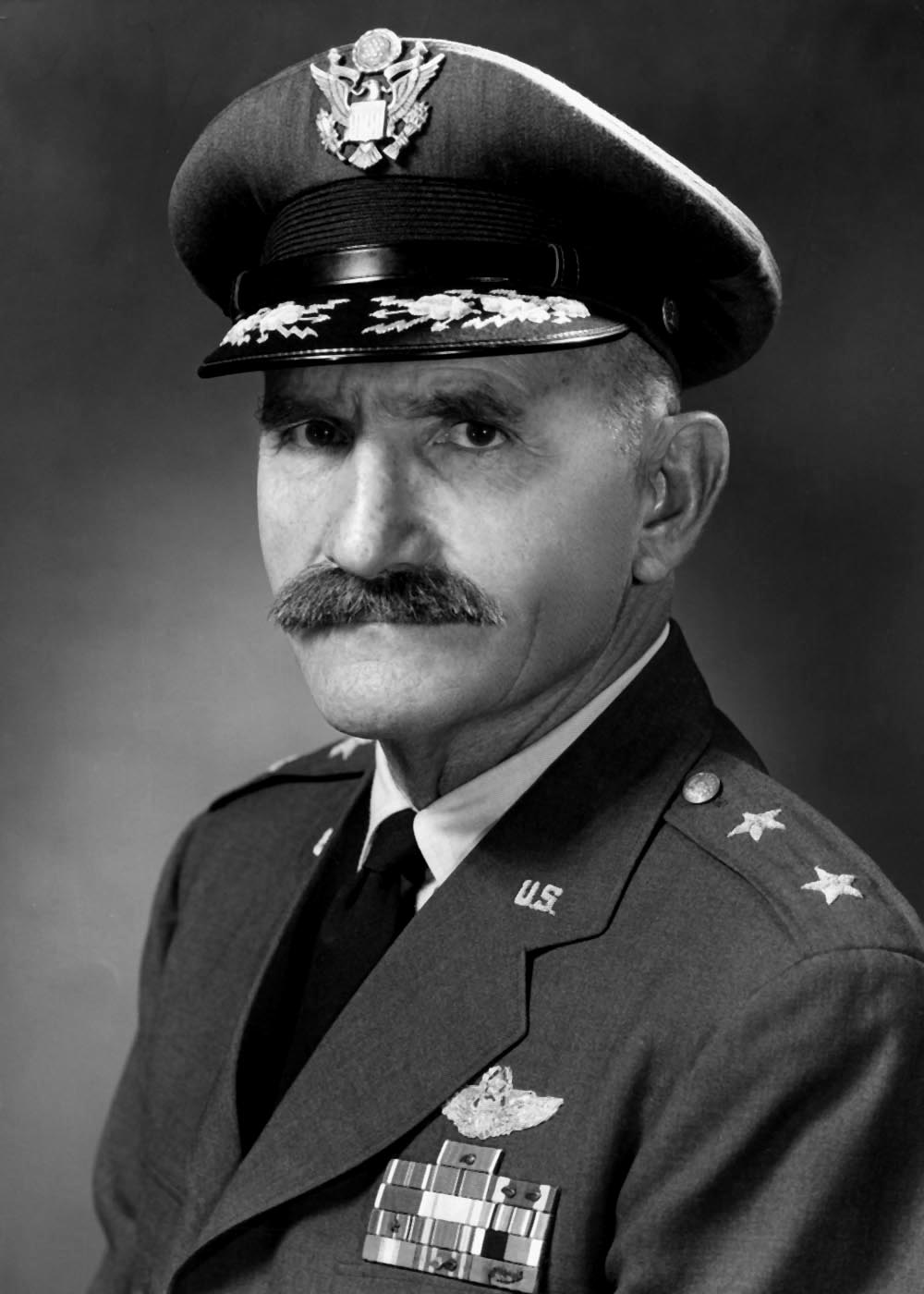
- Major General Henry Russell Spicer
- Born: February 16, 1909; Colorado Springs
- Died: December 5, 1968 (aged 59)
- Burial place: Fort Sam Houston National Cemetery
- Military career
- Allegiance: United States
- Branch: United States Army Air Corps; United States Army Air Forces; United States Air Force
- Service years: 1933-1968
- Rank: Major general
- Nickname: Russ
- Commands: 36th Fighter Group; 357th Fighter Group; 3525th Pilot Training Wing; Seventeenth Air Force; 25th Air Division
- Awards: Distinguished Flying Cross; Bronze Star Medal; Air Medal (2); Legion of Merit (1); Croix de Guerre

Henry Russell Spicer (February 16, 1909 – December 5, 1968) was a major general in the United States Air Force. He was a World War II fighter pilot and prisoner at Stalag Luft I.

== Early life and education ==
Spicer was born on 16 February 1909 in Colorado Springs, Colorado. He attended the University of Arizona and received a bachelor of science degree in economics in 1932.

== Army Air Corps ==
Spicer joined the Army Air Corps 1n 1933 and was commissioned a second lieutenant in 1935.

He was assigned to the 95th Pursuit Squadron at March Field near Riverside California. In 1936, he joined the 6th Pursuit Squadron at Wheeler Field, Honolulu, Hawaii.

== World War II ==
In July 1942, Spicer was assigned as director of training at the Army Air Forces Training Command single-engine training school at Moore Field, Mission, Texas.

Spicer was assigned as executive officer of the Eighth Air Force 66th Fighter Wing in October 1943. He took command of the 357th Fighter Group in February 1944 and was shot down March 5, 1944 He was captured by the Germans and was a prisoner of war at German World War II prisoner-of-war camp Stalag Luft I near Barth, Germany, until May 14, 1945.

== Cold War ==
Spicer commanded the 36th Fighter Group in the Panama Canal Zone from 1946 until 1949. He took command of the 3525th Pilot Training Wing at Williams Air Force Base in Arizona in 1950. In 1951, he assumed command of the Crew Training Wing at Wichita Air Force Base in Kansas. In 1953 he was vice commander of crew training at Randolph Air Force Base in Texas and commander in 1957.

Spicer became commander of Seventeenth Air Force at Wheelus Air Base in Tripoli in 1958. He became deputy commander of the Seventeenth Air Force at Ramstein Air Base in Germany in 1959 and commander in 1960. He took command of the 25th Air Division in 1962.

Spicer retired in 1968.

== Awards and decorations ==
Spicer's decorations include the Legion of Merit with oak leaf cluster, Distinguished Flying Cross, Bronze Star Medal, Air Medal with two oak leaf clusters, and the French Croix de Guerre with palm.
