= John B. England =

American World War II flying ace

John Brooke England
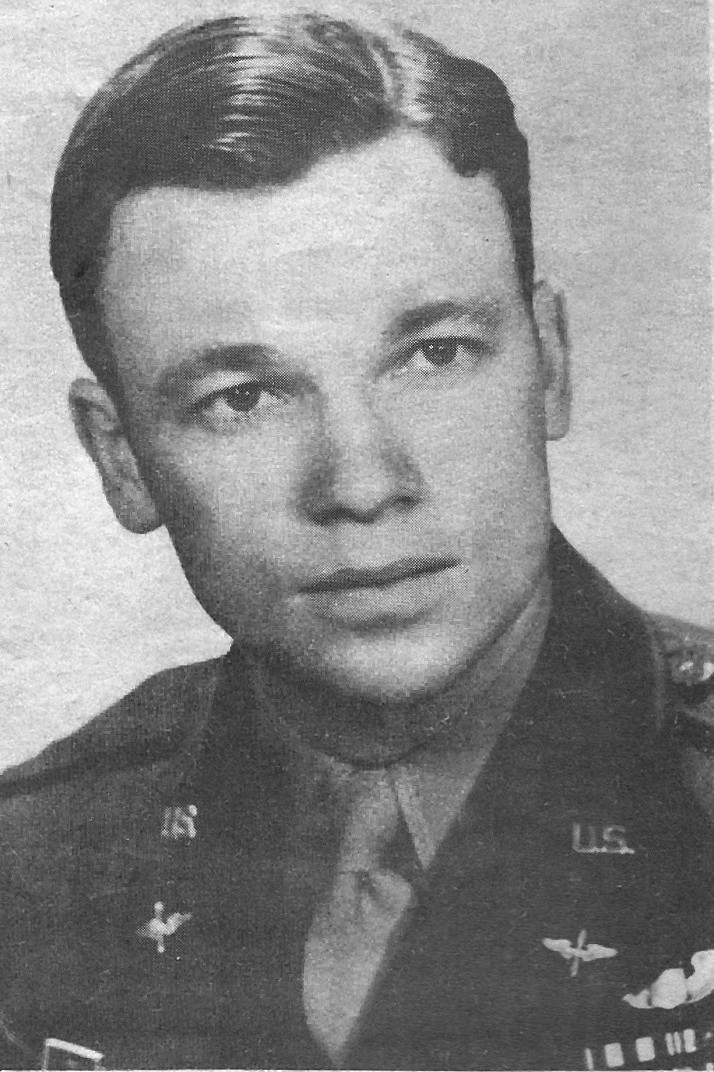
- Born: January 15, 1923; Caruthersville, Missouri, U.S.
- Died: November 17, 1954 (aged 31); Toul-Rosières Air Base, France
- Burial place: Arlington National Cemetery
- Military career
- Allegiance: United States
- Branch: United States Army Air Forces; United States Air Force
- Service years: 1942–1954
- Rank: Lieutenant colonel
- Nickname: "Johnny"
- Commands: 389th Fighter-Bomber Squadron; 86th Composite Group; 362nd Fighter Squadron
- Conflicts: World War II; Korean War
- Awards: Silver Star; Distinguished Flying Cross (4); Air Medal (15)

John Brooke England (15 January 1923 – 17 November 1954) was a World War II fighter ace in the American 357th Fighter Group and a career fighter pilot in the United States Air Force.

== Early life ==
He was the son of Bidker H. and Pearl J. England of Caruthersville, Missouri. After graduating from Caruthersville High School on 16 May 1940, he worked as a bookkeeper and later he marketed various agricultural commodities. Growing up on the banks of the Mississippi River, his favorite hobby was fishing.

== World War II ==
Following the United States entry into World War II, England enlisted in the United States Army on 1 April 1942. He was accepted into aviation cadet training and was sent to Yuma, Arizona, where his flight instructor was future U.S. Senator and presidential candidate Barry Goldwater. He completed his flying training on 9 March 1943. He was then commissioned as a second lieutenant and received his pilot's wings on 10 March 1943.

After this training, he was assigned to the 362d Fighter Squadron of the 357th Fighter Group, which was then flying the P-39 Airacobra. The 357th moved to Santa Rosa, California and then moved for additional training to Oroville, California in August 1943. After additional moves and training in other states, the personnel of the 357th boarded the RMS Queen Elizabeth and sailed from New York City on 23 November 1943.

The unit was assigned to RAF Leiston and after transitioning to the P-51 Mustang, they flew their first combat mission on 11 February 1944. England was promoted to first lieutenant on 26 October 1943 and by the time he was promoted to captain on 28 April 1944 he already had 6.5 aerial credits. After his first victory on 8 March 1944, he attained the status of "ace" in only forty-eight days.

He took command of the 362d Fighter Squadron on 25 August 1944 and continued as the squadron commander until 8 April 1945. He was promoted to major on 4 December 1944 and continued to fly combat sorties achieving his last aerial victory on 14 January 1945 for a total of 17.5 enemy aircraft destroyed in flight.

=== Summary of enemy aircraft damaged/destroyed ===
Date	Location	Air/Ground	Number	Type	Status
8 March 1944	Near Steinhuder Meer (Lake), Germany	Air	1	Bf 109	Destroyed
16 March 1944	20 miles south of Stuttgart, Germany	Air	1	Bf 110	Destroyed
11 April 1944	20 miles northeast of Magdeburg, Germany	Air	0.5	Bf 109	Destroyed
13 April 1944	West of Mannheim, Germany	Air	1	Fw 190	Destroyed
24 April 1944	South of Munich, Germany	Air	3	Bf 110	Destroyed
27 May 1944	North of Strasbourg, France	Air	1	Bf 109	Damaged
18 August 1944	20 miles northeast of Paris, France	Air	0.5	Bf 109	Destroyed
13 September 1944	South of Nordhausen, Germany	Air	2.5	Bf 109	Destroyed
6 October 1944	20 miles northwest of Berlin, Germany	Air	1	Bf 109	Damaged
6 October 1944	20 miles northwest of Berlin, Germany	Air	2	Bf 109	Destroyed
27 November 1944	South of Magdeburg, Germany	Air	4	Fw 190	Destroyed
14 January 1945	20 miles northwest of Berlin, Germany	Air	1	Bf 109	Destroyed
25 January 1952	Korea	Air	1	MiG-15	Damaged

All information on enemy aircraft damaged and destroyed is from Stars and Bars.

== Later career and death ==
After the war, Major England stayed in the Air Force. In 1949, he was given command of the Air Force's cadet training school at Nellis AFB, Nevada.

On 5 June 1949, he married Marilyn Ruth Boswell and they had three children. During this time he formed a flight demonstration team called "The Red Devils", flying World War II-era P-51 Mustangs painted an all-over red. The team was short-lived, because the Mustangs and England were needed for service in Korea.

England served briefly in the Korean War flying six combat missions and on 20 February 1951 he was promoted to lieutenant colonel. In October 1953, he was assigned to Alexandria Air Force Base in Alexandria, Louisiana as commander of the 389th Fighter-Bomber Squadron where he flew the F-86 Sabre. The squadron deployed to what was then Toul-Rosières Air Base, France in the fall of 1954. From Toul, England flew a mission for gunnery practice near Tripoli, Libya. He was then returning to Toul from Marseille, France, on 17 November 1954. Due to bad weather and low visibility, he made several attempts to land and on his final approach his engine flamed out due to lack of fuel. As he attempted to land without power, he was killed while trying to avoid a barracks building.

== Legacy ==
For the selfless acts committed during his death, Alexandria AFB was renamed England Air Force Base.

He was the leading ace of World War II from Missouri and England City Park in Caruthersville, Missouri has a memorial in his honor. Part of the inscription on the plaque reads "This memorial of Colonel England is dedicated to and represents the highest tradition of American fighting men lost in wars fought for the preservation of our freedoms."

England was buried at Arlington National Cemetery on 30 November 1954.

== Awards and decorations ==
Command pilot

Silver Star
Distinguished Flying Cross with three bronze oak leaf clusters
Air Medal with two silver and bronze oak leaf clusters
Air Medal with bronze oak leaf cluster (second ribbon required for accouterment spacing)
Air Force Presidential Unit Citation with bronze oak leaf cluster
Army Good Conduct Medal
American Campaign Medal
European-African-Middle Eastern Campaign Medal with silver campaign star
World War II Victory Medal
Army of Occupation Medal
National Defense Service Medal
Korean Service Medal
French Croix de guerre with silver star
United Nations Korea Medal
Korean War Service Medal
