= 163rd Fighter Squadron =

United States military unit

163rd Fighter Squadron

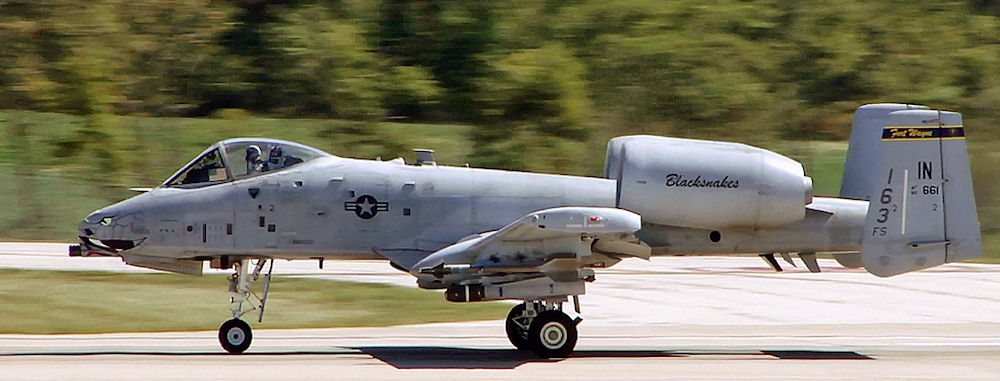
- 163rd Fighter Squadron Fairchild Republic A-10A Thunderbolt II 82-0661
- Active: 1942–1945; 1947–1952; 1952–present
- Country: United States
- Allegiance: Indiana
- Branch: Air National Guard
- Type: Squadron
- Role: Close Air Support
- Part of: Indiana Air National Guard
- Garrison/HQ: Fort Wayne Air National Guard Base, Indiana
- Nickname: Blacksnakes
- Engagements: European Theater of Operations
- Decorations: Distinguished Unit Citation; French Croix de Guerre with Palm

Insignia
- 163rd Fighter Squadron emblem

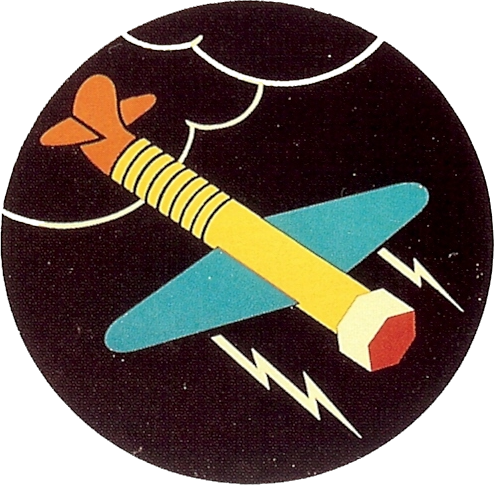
- Unofficial 365th Fighter Squadron emblem
- World War II fuselage code: CH
- Tail code: IN

The 163rd Fighter Squadron is a unit of the Indiana Air National Guard's 122nd Fighter Wing, located at Fort Wayne Air National Guard Base, Indiana. The 163rd is equipped with the F-16 Fighting Falcon.

== History ==
=== World War II ===
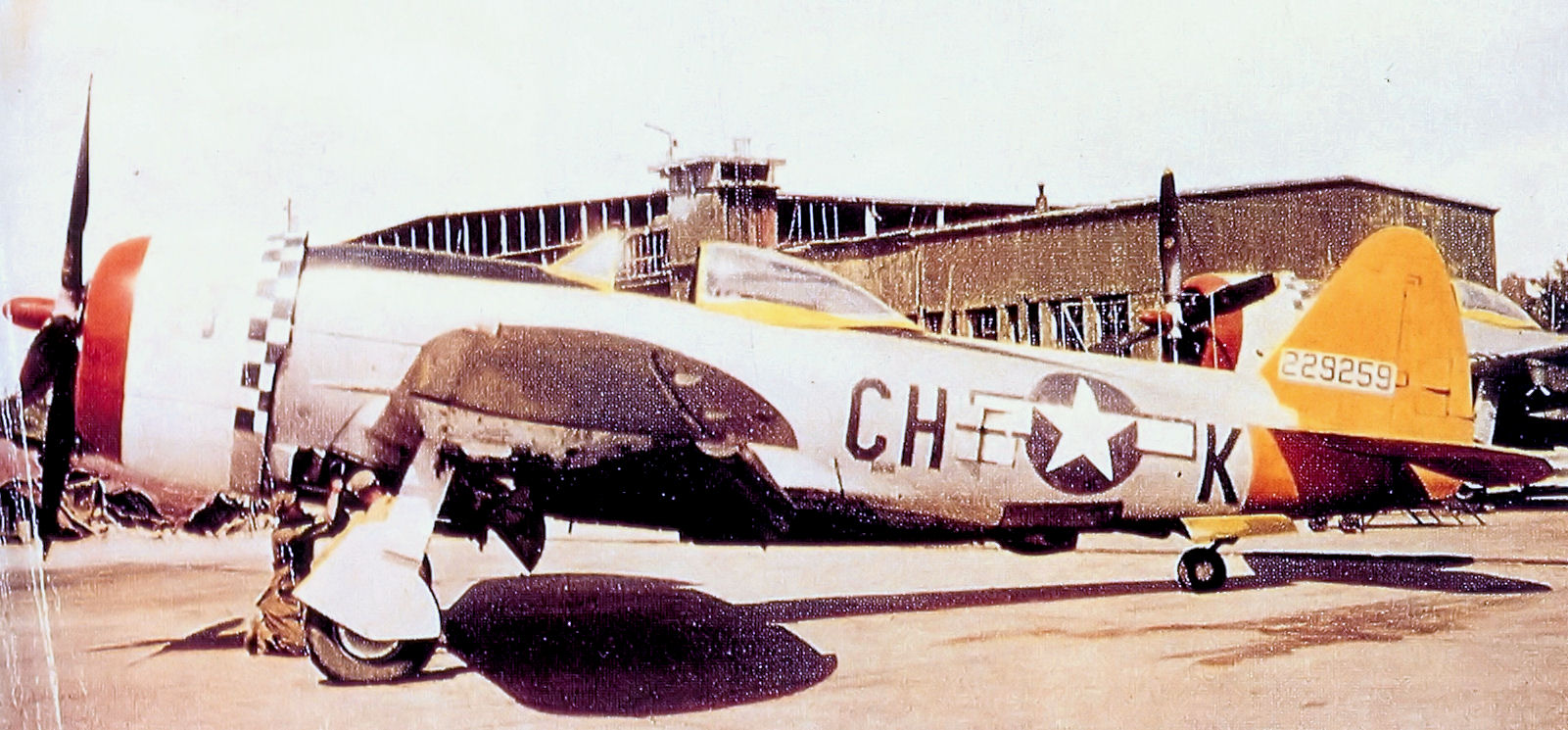
365th Fighter Squadron P-47D (Note: Aircraft is Republic P-47D-28-RA Thunderbolt serial 42-29259 at Mannheim/Sandhofen Airfield (Y-79), Germany, May 1945.)

The squadron was first activated as the 365th Fighter Squadron on 1 January 1943 at Richmond Army Air Base, Virginia as one of the original squadrons of the 358th Fighter Group. The squadron initially began training with the Curtiss P-40 Warhawk. Later that year, the unit replaced its Warhawks with the Republic P-47 Thunderbolt, which it flew for the remainder of the war. The squadron left the United States in September 1943.

The 365th arrived in England during October 1943, where it began operations with Eighth Air Force on 20 December 1943, but was transferred to Ninth Air Force in February 1944. The unit engaged primarily in missions escorting bombers attacking targets on the continent of Europe until April 1944. The squadron then dive bombed marshalling yards and airfields and attacked enemy communications during April and May from its new station, an advanced landing ground at RAF High Halden, to help prepare for the invasion of Normandy.

The squadron escorted troop carrier formations on D Day and the following day as the formations dropped paratroopers on the Cotentin Peninsula. For the remainder of June, it attacked rail lines, troop concentrations, bridges and transport. The squadron moved to France in July and, from its base at Cretteville, took part in operations that resulted in the Allied breakthrough at St Lo. The squadron continued to fly escort, interdiction and close air support missions during the Allied drive across France and into Germany.

The squadron received a Distinguished Unit Citation for its actions between 24 December 1944 and 2 January 1945, when it supported Seventh Army attacking railroads and rolling stock, other vehicles and enemy artillery formations. It also destroyed numerous Luftwaffe fighters while defending against Operation Bodenplatte, an attack concentrating on forward Allied air bases in an attempt by the Luftwaffe to attain air superiority in the area of the Battle of the Bulge. In March, the squadron attacked German forces attempting to withdraw across the Rhine River, destroying motor transport and hampering the withdrawal efforts, earning a second Distinguished Unit Citation. The following month, the squadron attacked enemy airfields near Munich and Ingolstadt, engaging aircraft and supporting the advance of ground forces in the area, earning a third award of the Distinguished Unit Citation. The squadron was also awarded the French Croix de Guerre with Palm by the Government of France for its assistance in the liberation of France. The squadron was credited with the destruction of 27 enemy aircraft during the war.

=== Indiana Air National Guard ===
The 365th Fighter Squadron was redesignated the 163rd Fighter Squadron, and was allotted to the National Guard on 24 May 1946. It was organized at Stout Field, Indiana and was extended federal recognition on 9 December 1946. The 163rd Fighter Squadron was assigned to the 122d Fighter Group, Indiana Air National Guard and equipped with F-51D Mustang fighters.

The 163rd and the 113th Fighter Squadron at Baer Field, Fort Wayne, were the operational squadrons of the 122nd Fighter Group. Its mission was the air defense of Indiana. The 113th flew training missions primarily over the northern part of Indiana, while the 163rd operated from Indianapolis south to the Ohio River border with Kentucky.

During the postwar years, the Air National Guard was almost like a flying country club and a pilot could often show up at the field, check out an aircraft and go flying. However, these units also had regular military exercises that kept up proficiency and in gunnery and bombing contests they would often score better than full-time USAF units.

==== Korean War Federalization ====
With the surprise invasion of South Korea on 25 June 1950, and the regular military's complete lack of readiness, most of the Air National Guard was federalized and placed on active duty. The 163rd Fighter Squadron and its parent 122nd Fighter Group were federalized on 10 February 1951.

The 163rd initially remained at Baer Field and the 122nd Fighter Group established headquarters at Stout Field, Indianapolis along with the 113th Fighter Squadron under Air Defense Command (ADC). ADC established the 122nd Fighter-Interceptor Wing with the 122nd Fighter-Interceptor Group as its operational unit with a mission for the air defense of Indiana and the upper midwest as part of the Eastern Air Defense Force. Both squadrons were re-equipped with very long range F-51H Mustangs that were developed during World War II for long distance B-29 Superfortress bomber escort missions in the Pacific Theater.

On 1 May the 113th was dispersed to Scott Air Force Base, Illinois and the 163rd to Sioux City Municipal Airport, Iowa. Now assigned for the air defense of the Central United States, the squadrons flew interception missions for ADC. The 122nd Group was inactivated on 6 February 1952, the squadron being reassigned to the 31st Air Division. Its period of federalization ended, the squadron was returned to Indiana state control on 1 November 1952.

==== Air Defense mission ====
The unit was reformed at Baer Field and continued to fly the F-51H Mustangs, returning to its pre-federalization air defense mission of Indiana. With the end of the line for the Mustang in USAF service, the United States Air Force, in an effort to upgrade to an all jet fighter force, required Air National Guard Air Defense Command units to upgrade to jet-powered aircraft. In July 1954 the Mustangs were retired and the squadron was re-equipped with F-80C Shooting Star jets that had seen combat in the Korean War. In March 1956, conversion to refurbished and reconditioned F-86A Sabres commenced, and in April 1958 new F-84F Thunderstreaks were received.

==== Tactical Fighters ====
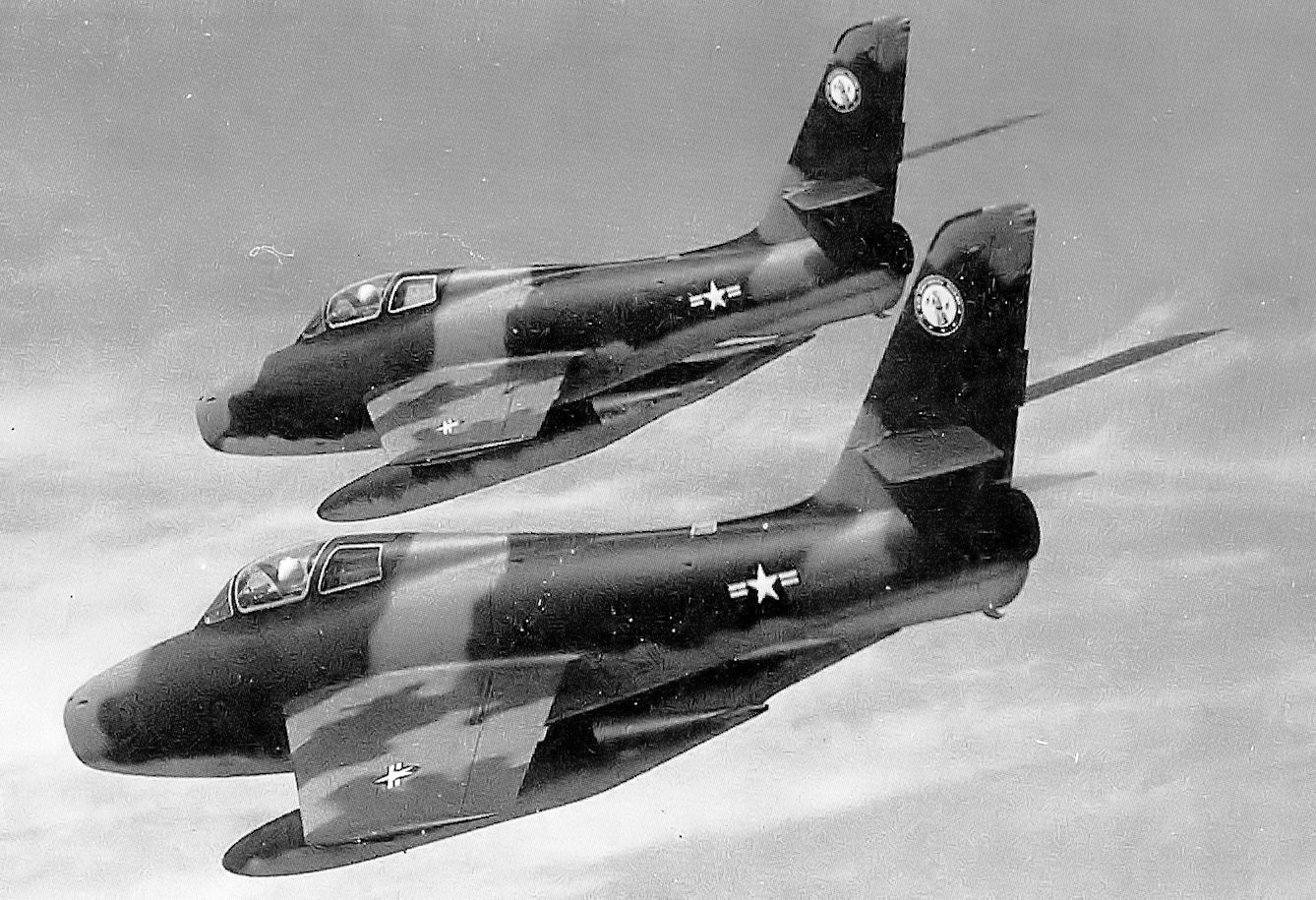
163rd Tactical Fighter Squadron – F-84F Thunderstreaks about 1967 in Vietnam War camouflage.

In July 1959, the 163rd was designated as a Tactical Fighter Squadron (Special Delivery), with a mission of the delivery of Tactical nuclear weapons. Although the 163rd trained for the delivery of tactical nuclear weapons, it never had any actual nuclear weapons on hand, nor did the base at Fort Wayne ever have nuclear weapon storage facilities. In 1959 and 1960 the squadron participated in exercises Dark Cloud and Pine Cone III, the latter taking place at Congaree Air Force Base, South Carolina. In the exercises, the squadron practiced delivery of tactical nuclear weapons in the fictitious country of "North Saladia".

==== 1961 Berlin Crisis ====
On 1 October 1961, the 163rd and the 122nd Tactical Fighter Wing were federalized and ordered to active service as part of Operation Tack Hammer, the United States response to the 1961 Berlin Crisis. Due to DOD budget restrictions, the 122nd TFW was instructed to deploy only a portion of its total strength and only the 163rd Tactical Fighter Squadron was deployed to Chambley-Bussières Air Base, France, with the other two squadrons being on active duty at their home stations, ready to reinforce the 163rd if necessary.

On 6 November, twenty-six F-84F Thunderstreaks arrived at Chambley, with the wings support aircraft (C-47 and T-33A's) arriving by mid-November. Due to its reduced force structure, the deployed elements of the wing were designated the 7122nd Tactical Wing while in France. By 1 December the ground support units arrived and the 7122nd prepared for an estimated overseas deployment of 10 months.

Rotations of Air National Guard pilots from the stateside squadrons in Indiana was performed to train them in local flying conditions in Europe. This allowed the 163rd to maintain 100 percent manning and also to relieve the boredom of the national guard pilots on active duty in CONUS and kept them connected to the overseas part of the Wing.

The mission of the 7122nd was to support Seventeenth Air Force and various NATO exercises in Europe, flying up to 30 sorties a day exercising with Seventh Army units in West Germany. NATO exchanges with the West German 32nd Fighter-Bomber Wing occurred in April 1962 to increase understanding of NATO air integration and terminology.

By April, the Berlin Crisis appeared to be settled and the Kennedy Administration was interested in saving money on this emergency call-up of national guard units. On 7 June the 163rd was directed to return to CONUS with all personnel, however the aircraft and equipment were to remain at Chambley.

The support C-47 and T-33s were flown back to Indiana, and in July the Air National Guardsmen of the 122 TFW/163 TFS returned to CONUS. On 16 July the 7122nd Tactical Wing was discontinued with its F-84F aircraft being turned over to the new 366th Tactical Fighter Wing. The Guardsmen were released from active duty and returned to Indiana state control, 31 August 1962.

==== Tactical Air Command ====
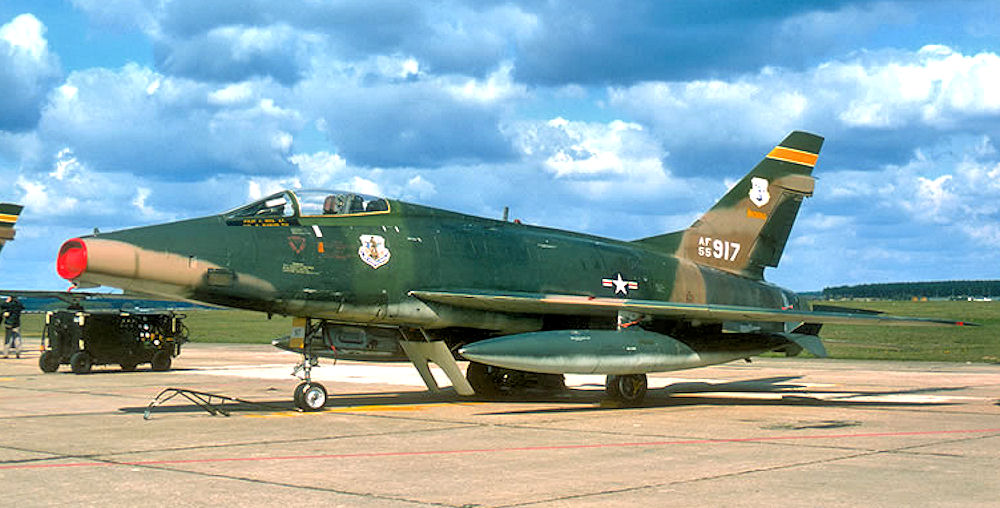
163rd Tactical Fighter Squadron F-100D Super Sabre (Note: Aircraft is North American F-100D-45-NH Super Sabre, serial 55-2917. This airplane was retired to the Military Aircraft Storage and Disposition Center 31 May 1979. It was later modified to QF-100D drone and expended.)

After the Berlin Federalization, the 113th transferred its 25 F-84Fs to the active-duty USAF to fill gaps in TAC Wings; the aircraft being temporally replaced by RF-84Fs from the 363rd Tactical Reconnaissance Wing at Shaw Air Force Base, South Carolina that was upgrading to the McDonnell RF-101 Voodoo. The squadron flew the RF-84F until May 1964 to maintain proficiency but did not train in photo-reconnaissance. Re-equipped with F-84Fs the squadron continued normal peacetime training throughout the 1960s. Individual squadron members volunteered for duty during the Vietnam War, however the 163rd was not federalized in 1968 as the F-84Fs were not considered front line combat aircraft.

In June 1971, the unit converted to the North American F-100 Super Sabre as a result of the American draw-down from the Vietnam War, the squadron receiving former combat veteran aircraft. In 1976, the unit participated in its first Red Flag Exercise and also deployed overseas to RAF Lakenheath, England.

The McDonnell F-4C Phantom II aircraft arrived on 18 November 1979, and the Tail Code "FW" (Fort Wayne) was adopted by the 122nd TFW. The unit flew this new aircraft to Balikesir Air Base, Turkey in 1983 for exercise Coronet Crown, and once again in 1986 for exercise "Coronet Cherokee". In 1986 the F-4Cs were replaced with more up-to-date F-4E Phantom IIs. In 1989, the squadron again deployed to Southwest Asia for exercise "Coronet Brave" in conjunction with "Bright Star". The unit continued its standard of excellence by supporting Operation Desert Shield and Desert Storm with deployments to Saudi Arabia by the Security Police, January through June 1991, and to Tyndall Air Force Base, Florida, by the Tactical Hospital in September/October 1991.

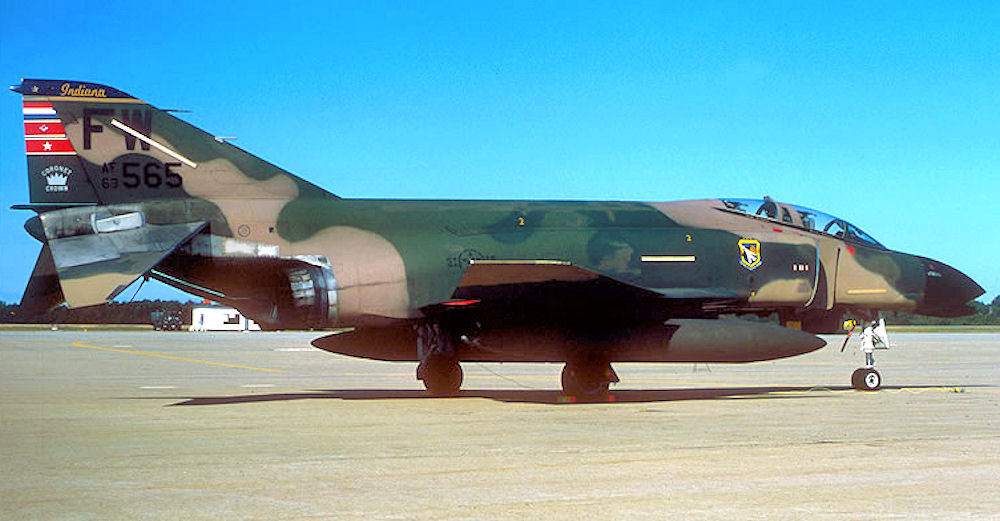
163rd TFS F-4C Phantom II about 1980 (Note: Aircraft is McDonnel F-4C-19-MC Phantom II, serial 63-7565. This plane was retired and placed on static display at Stout Field.)

The squadron started receiving their first F-16C/D Fighting Falcon aircraft in 1991. These were of the block 25 type, replacing the venerable F-4E in the air defense and attack roles with the retirement of the Phantom. The transition process was quite fast since the first F-16s arrived in October 1991 and the last F-4 flight was on 21 January 1992. The first four F-16Cs were from the 50th Tactical Fighter Wing, Hahn Air Base, Germany. Twenty additional aircraft were received: twelve more from Hahn Air Base, seven from 363rd Fighter Wing, Shaw Air Force Base, South Carolina, and one from the 184th Fighter Group, McConnell Air Force Base, Kansas when the 184th converted to Rockwell B-1B Lancer bombers.

==== Air Combat Command ====
In 1992 with the end of the Cold War, Tactical Air Command (TAC) was inactivated and the Air Force reorganized its combat forces, with Air Combat Command being established on 1 June as a successor organization to TAC and Strategic Air Command. The Air National Guard was assigned a new priority, taking over the Air Defense Mission of Air Defense, Tactical Air Command, which had replaced Aerospace Defense Command in 1979.

In the case of the 163rd, this was already the case in the F-4 and even in the F-100 days. In the early days of F-16 operations the emphasis was more on air defense than on the attack role. With the absence of modern targeting pods the deployment of air-to-ground weapons was somewhat hampered since other units had to be called upon to perform the target designation.

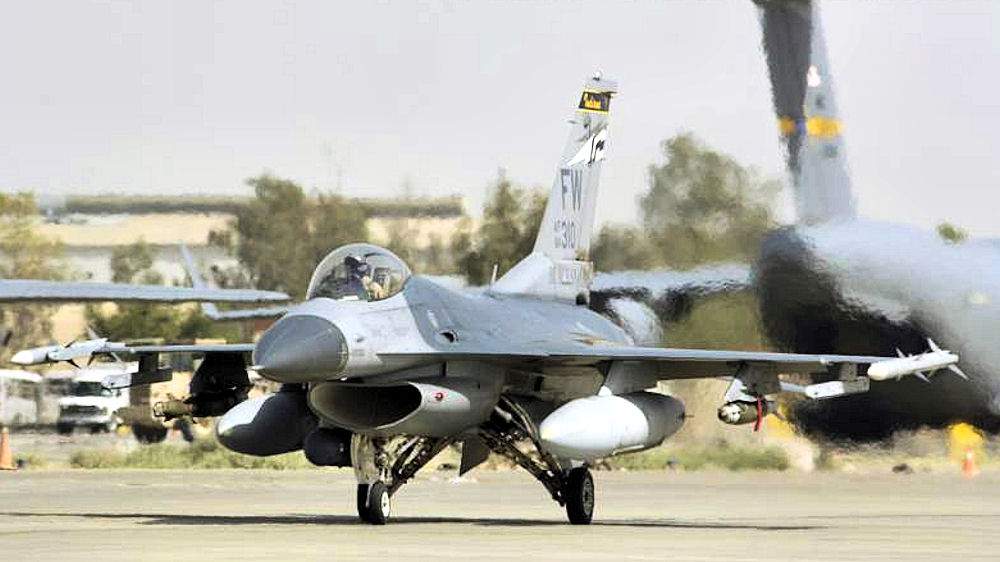
163rd Expeditionary Fighter Squadron F-16 at Balad AB, Iraq, 2006 (Note: Aircraft is General Dynamics F-16C block 25 Fighting Falcon, serial 84-1310.)

In February 1993, the 122nd FW successfully completed its first overseas deployment with the F-16C aircraft. The exercise, "Coronet Avenger," took place in Egypt, and served as a training exercise, testing the capability of the unit to deploy and operate at an overseas location.

Fiscal Year 1994 saw the 122nd FW participate in various humanitarian relief efforts throughout the world. Members of the base Hospital participated in Operation Sea Signal, which is the Air National Guard's effort to support the refugees at Guantanamo Bay, Cuba.

In mid-1996, the Air Force, in response to budget cuts, and changing world situations, began experimenting with Air Expeditionary organizations. The Air Expeditionary Force concept was developed that would mix Active-Duty, Reserve and Air National Guard elements into a combined force. Instead of entire permanent units deploying as provisional as in the 1991 Gulf War, Expeditionary units are composed of "aviation packages" from several wings, including active-duty Air Force, the Air Force Reserve Command and the Air National Guard, would be married together to carry out the assigned deployment rotation.

During fiscal year 1996, the 122nd FW was involved in a critical series of rigorous exercises designed to determine our operational readiness in mobility and war fighting capabilities. The 122nd FW met every challenge and completed the Operational Readiness Inspection in September 1996 with outstanding results.

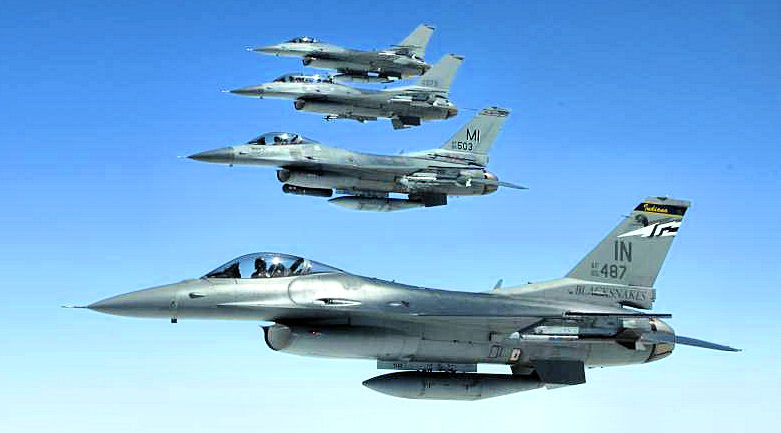
: F-16s assigned to the 122nd FW and the 127th FW after refuelling from a KC-135R Stratotanker in 2009.

In 1997 the name of the squadron was changed from Marksmen to Blacksnakes.

==== Twenty-first century ====
In 2005 the squadron introduced a reconnaissance asset with the Theater Airborne Reconnaissance System coming available to the unit. The 163rd FS was one of a few ANG units to fly with this reconnaissance pod.

In 2008, after having flown for 17 years with the block 25 aircraft, a number of those came to the end of their operational lifespan. It was therefore decided that the aircraft of the 163rd FS were to be replaced with more modern examples. More modern is quite relative since the aircraft they received were Block 30 F-16C/Ds manufactured between 1987 and 1989. These large-intake models were mainly coming from the Michigan Air National Guard 107th Fighter Squadron which was transitioning to the A-10 Thunderbolt II at the time. With the upgrade to the Block 30 aircraft, the tail code of the 163rd was changed from "FW" (Fort Wayne) to "IN" (Indiana) in 2009 when the 181st Fighter Wing at Hulman Field became a non-flying unit. However, only a few of the F-16s were re-coded.

In 2009 – the year the unit honored its predecessor unit – the 358th FG – with a heritage jet – it was decided that the squadron was to retire their 20-year-old F-16s and become an A-10 Thunderbolt II squadron. The conversion happened in 2010.

Following the passage of the 2023 National Defense Authorization Act, the squadron transitioned back to the F-16 Fighting Falcon. The NDAA allows the Air Force to retire 21 A-10s. Some of the squadron's older aircraft will be retired, with others being sent to other units.

== Lineage ==
- Constituted as the 365th Fighter Squadron, Single Engine on 20 December 1942

Activated on 1 January 1943
Inactivated on 7 November 1945.

- Redesignated 163rd Fighter Squadron, Single Engine and allotted to the National Guard on 24 May 1946

Activated on 25 August 1947
Extended federal recognition on 10 November 1947
Federalized and ordered to active service on 1 February 1951

- Redesignated 163rd Fighter-Interceptor Squadron on 10 February 1951

Inactivated, released from active duty and returned to Indiana state control on 1 November 1952

- Redesignated 163rd Fighter-Bomber Squadron and activated on 1 November 1952
- Redesignated 163rd Fighter-Interceptor Squadron on 1 July 1955
- Redesignated 163rd Fighter-Day Squadron on 1 July 1958

Redesignated 163rd Tactical Fighter Squadron (Special Delivery) on 1 July 1959
Federalized and ordered to active service on 1 October 1961
Released from active duty and returned to Indiana state control, 31 August 1962
Redesignated 163rd Tactical Fighter Squadron on 15 October 1962
Redesignated 163rd Fighter Squadron on 16 March 1992
Components designated as 163rd Expeditionary Fighter Squadron when acting as the major force provider when deployed.

=== Assignments ===
- 358th Fighter Group, 1 January 1943 – 7 November 1945
- 122nd Fighter Group (later 122nd Fighter-Interceptor Group), 10 November 1947
- 31st Air Division, 7 February 1952 – 1 November 1952
- 122nd Fighter-Bomber Group (later 122nd Fighter-Interceptor Group, 122nd Fighter-Day Group, 122nd Tactical Fighter Group), 1 November 1952
- 7122nd Tactical Wing (Special Delivery), 1 October 1961 –
- 122nd Tactical Fighter Group, 8 May 1962
- 122nd Tactical Fighter Wing, c. 10 December 1974
- 122nd Operations Group, 16 March 1992 – present

=== Stations ===
- Richmond Army Air Base, Virginia, 1 January 1943
- Baltimore Army Air Field, Maryland, 28 April 1943
- Millville Army Air Field, New Jersey, 29 May 1943
- Camp Springs Army Air Field, Maryland, 3 July 1943
- Richmond Army Air Base, Virginia, 16 Aug – 26 September 1943
- RAF Goxhill (AAF-345), England, 20 October 1943
- RAF Leiston (AAF-373), England, 3 December 1943
- RAF Raydon (AAF-157), England, 2 February 1944
- RAF High Halden (AAF-411), England, 13 April 1944
- Cretteville Airfield (A-14), France, 3 July 1944
- Pontorson Airfield (A-28), France, 14 August 1944
- Vitry-En-Artois Airfield (A-67), France, c. 15 September 1944

Operated from St-Dizier Airfield (A-64), France, 12 – 17 October 1944

- Mourmelon-le-Grand Airfield (A-80), France, c. 17 October 1944
- Toul-Croix De Metz Airfield (A-90), France, c. 20 November 1944
- Mannheim-Sandhofen Airfield (Y-79), Germany, 7 April 1945
- Reims, France, c. 23 June – 10 July 1945
- La Junta Army Air Field, Colo, c. 4 August – 7 November 1945
- Baer Field, Indiana, 25 August 1947 – present
- Sioux City Municipal Airport, Iowa 10 March 1952 – 1 November 1952
- Baer Field, Indiana, 1 November 1951
- Chambley-Bussières Air Base, France, 1 October 1961
- Baer Field (later Fort Wayne Air National Guard Station), Indiana, 20 August 1962 – present

==== Indiana Air National Guard deployments ====
- Operation Southern Watch (AEF)

Operated from: Ahmad al-Jaber Air Base, Kuwait, 30 April-15 June 1997

- Operation Iraqi Freedom (AEF)

Operated from: Al Udeid Air Base, Qatar, September–November 2004
Operated from: Balad Air Base, Iraq, February–April 2006
Operated from: Balad Air Base, Iraq, 18 September – December 2007

=== Aircraft ===
- P-40 Warhawk, 1943
- Republic P-47D Thunderbolt, 1943–1945
- Republic P-47N Thunderbolt, 1943–1945
- F-51D Mustang, 1946–1951
- F-51H Mustang, 1951–1954
- F-80C Shooting Star, 1954–1956
- F-86A Sabre, 1956–1958
- F-84F Thunderstreak, 1958–1962; 1964–1971
- RF-84F Thunderstreak, 1962–1964
- F-100D/F Super Sabre, 1971–1979
- F-4C Phantom II, 1979–1986
- F-4E Phantom II, 1986–1991
- Block 25 F-16C/D Fighting Falcon, 1991–2006
- Block 30 F-16C/D Fighting Falcon, 2006–2010
- A-10 Thunderbolt II, 2010–2023
- Block 40/42 F-16C/D Fighting Falcon, 2023–present

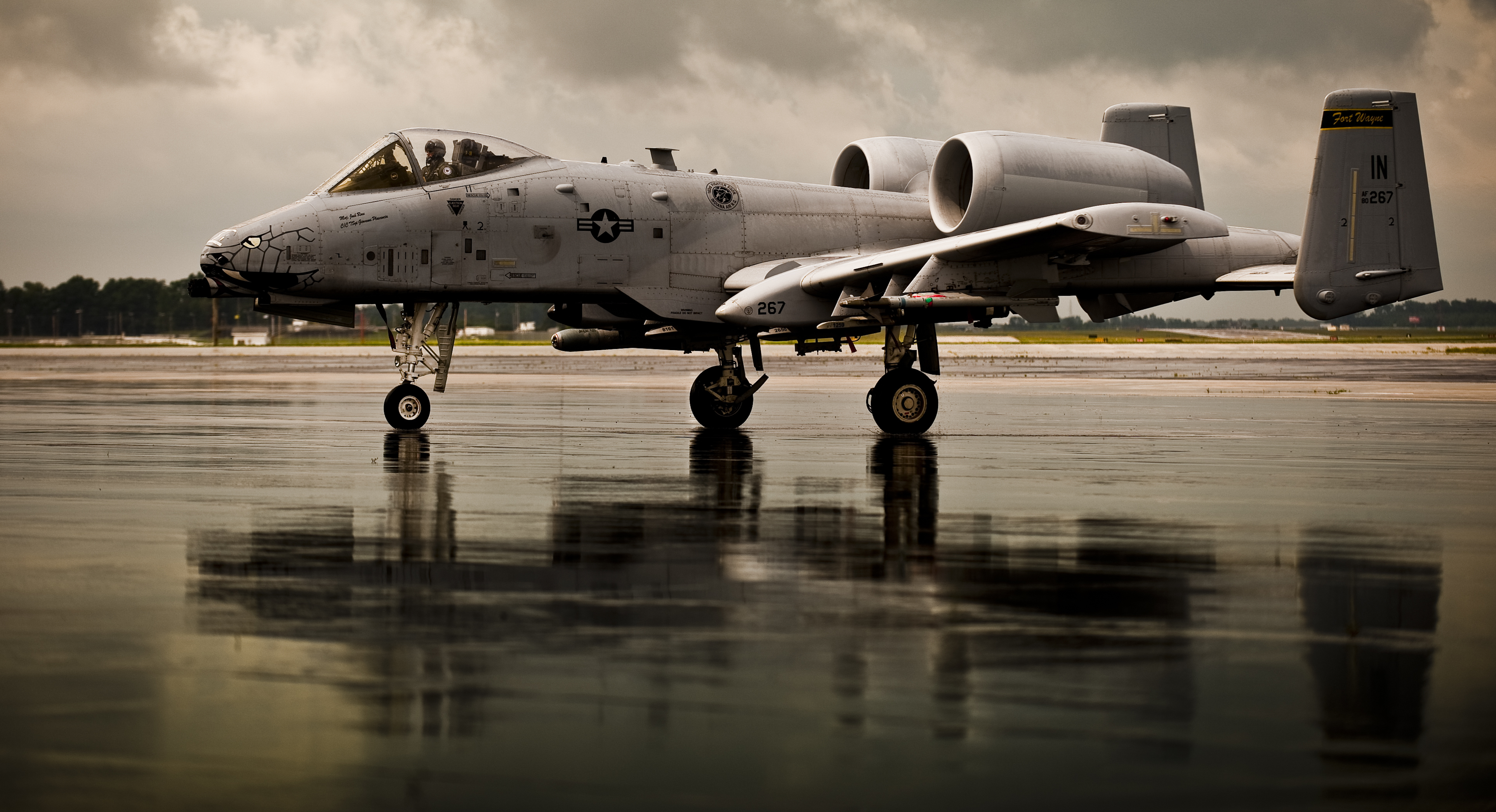
A-10C Warthog from the 163rd Fighter Squadron
