= 113th Air Support Operations Squadron =

113th Air Support Operations Squadron

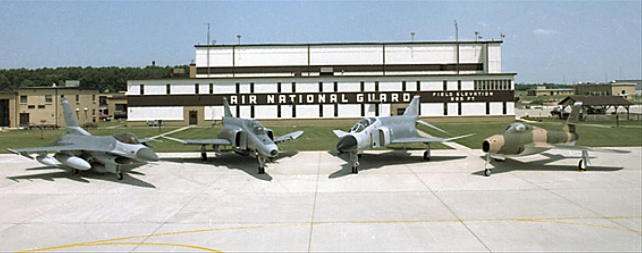
- Historical Aircraft assigned to the 113th Air Support Operations Squadron (Note: Shown are an F-16C (1991–2008), an F-4C (1979–1987); an F-4E (1987–1991) and an F-84F (1958–1971).)
- Active: 1: 1917–1919; 1923–1943; 1946–1952; 1953–present
- Country: United States
- Allegiance: Indiana
- Branch: Air National Guard
- Type: Squadron
- Role: Air support operations
- Part of: Indiana Air National Guard
- Garrison/HQ: Terre Haute Air National Guard Base, Indiana
- Nickname: Racers
- Decorations: Air Force Outstanding Unit Award

Insignia
- 113th Air Support Operations Squadron emblem

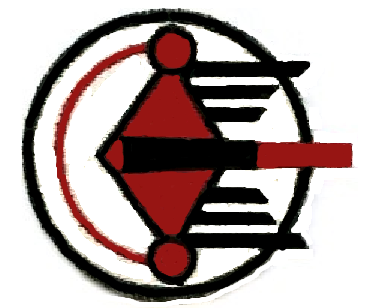
- 113th Fighter-Bomber Squadron emblem (Note: Approved 5 January 1954.)

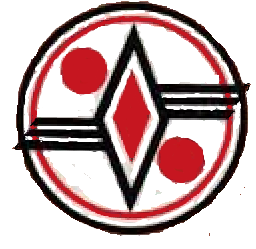
- 113th Observation Squadron emblem
- Tail codes: HF (1979–1991); TH (1991–2008)

The 113th Air Support Operations Squadron is a unit of the Indiana Air National Guard 181st Intelligence Wing located at Terre Haute Air National Guard Base (Hulman Field), Indiana.

The squadron is a descendant organization of the World War I 113th Aero Squadron, established on 26 August 1917. It was reformed on 1 August 1921, as the 113th Observation Squadron, and is one of the 29 original National Guard Observation Squadrons of the United States Army National Guard formed before World War II.

== History ==
Unit was formed as 113th Aero Squadron in August 1917 at Kelly Field, Texas and then assigned as an aviation unit with the Pennsylvania National Guard, however apparently performed support duties as a supply unit. Redesignated the 634th Aero Squadron in 1918 Did not deploy to France as part of the American Expeditionary Force. Squadron was demobilized in March 1919.

=== Indiana National Guard ===
Re-formed and its honors and combined in 1936 with the 137th Squadron (Observation), Indiana NG, which had activated at Fagley Field, Indiana during August 1921 (equipped with Curtiss Jennies). Redesignated the 113th Observation Squadron on 25 January 1923, the unit relocated to Schoen Field and then Stout Field (formerly Mars Hill), Indianapolis in October 1926.

The squadron, or elements thereof, called up to perform the following state duties: aerial surveillance of labor troubles in Vanderburg and Warwick Counties 22 February-23 March 1926; flood relief duties at Hazelton-Vincennes, IN, during the Wabash River flood 15–21 January 1930; aerial mapping survey of the state of Indiana in 1930; aerial surveillance of labor troubles during a coal miners' strike at the Dixie Bee Mine August–October 1932; flood relief efforts along the Ohio River in southern Indiana during January–February 1937. Supported the training of the 7th Cavalry Brigade at various times 1934–36. Conducted summer training at Wright Field, OH, or Godman Field, 1922–40.

=== World War II ===
The 113th was operating Douglas O-38Bs and North American O-47A/Bs when called to active duty on 17 January 1941 as part of the build-up of the Army Air Corps after the Fall of France. Ten days later the unit transferred to Key Field, Mississippi and began flying (assigned to the 67th Observation Group, 3d Air Force) Anti-Submarine patrols with O-47s, O-49s and O-52s over the Gulf of Mexico. Between 1942 and disbandment at Birmingham Army Airfield, Alabama on 30 November 1943 the 113th performed Operational Training for combat reconnaissance pilots in Bell P-39 Airacobras and other light reconnaissance aircraft.

=== Indiana Air National Guard ===
The 113th Tactical Reconnaissance Squadron was reconstituted on 21 June 1945. It was then redesignated as the 113th Fighter Squadron, and allotted to the National Guard on 24 May 1946. It was organized at Stout Field, Indianapolis, Indiana, and was extended federal recognition on 9 December 1946 The 113th Fighter Squadron was assigned to the 122d Fighter Group, Indiana Air National Guard and equipped with F-51D Mustang fighters.

The 113th and the 163rd Fighter Squadron at Stout Field were the operational squadrons of the 122d Group. Their mission was the air defense of Indiana. The 113th flew training missions primarily over the northern part of Indiana, while the 163rd operated from Indianapolis south to the Ohio River border with Kentucky.

During the postwar years, the Air National Guard was almost like a flying country club and a pilot could often show up at the field, check out an aircraft and go flying. However, these units also had regular military exercises that kept up proficiency and in gunnery and bombing contests they would often score better than full-time USAF units.

==== Korean War Federalization ====
With the surprise invasion of South Korea on 25 June 1960, and the regular military's lack of readiness, most of the Air National Guard was federalized placed on active duty. The 113th Fighter Squadron and its parent 122d Fighter Group were federalized on 10 February 1951.

The 113th initially remained at Stout Field and the 122d Fighter Group established headquarters at Stout Field along with the 163rd Fighter Squadron at Baer Field under Air Defense Command (ADC). ADC established the 122d Fighter-Interceptor Wing with the 122d Fighter-Interceptor Group as its operational unit with a mission for the air defense of Indiana and the upper midwest as part of the Eastern Air Defense Force. Both squadrons were re-equipped with very long range (VLR) F-51H Mustangs that were developed during World War II for long distance B-29 Superfortress bomber escort missions in the Pacific Theater.

On 1 May the 113th moved to Scott Air Force Base, Illinois and the 163rd FIS to Sioux City MAP, Iowa; the 122d FIW being transferred to the ADC Central Air Defense Force. Now assigned for the air defense of the Central United States, the squadrons flew interception missions for ADC. The 122d was inactivated on 6 February 1952, the squadron being reassigned to the 4706th Air Defense Wing. It was later transferred to the 33d Air Division on 1 April. Its period of federalization ended, the squadron was returned to Indiana state control on 1 November 1952.

==== Air defense mission ====
The unit was re-formed at Stout Field and continued to fly the F-51H Mustang, returning to its pre-federalization air defense mission of Indiana. With the end of the line for the Mustang in USAF service, the United States Air Force, in an effort to upgrade to an all jet fighter force, required Air National Guard Air Defense Command units to upgrade to jet-powered aircraft.

However, the facilities at Stout Field were inadequate for jet interceptor fighters and as a result the squadron moved to Hulman Field, at Terre Haute, on 1 January 1954. In July 1954 the Mustangs were retired and the squadron was re-equipped with F-80C Shooting Star jets that had seen combat in the Korean War. In March 1956, conversion to refurbished and reconditioned F-86A Sabres commenced, and in April 1958 new F-84F Thunderstreaks were received.

==== Tactical fighters ====
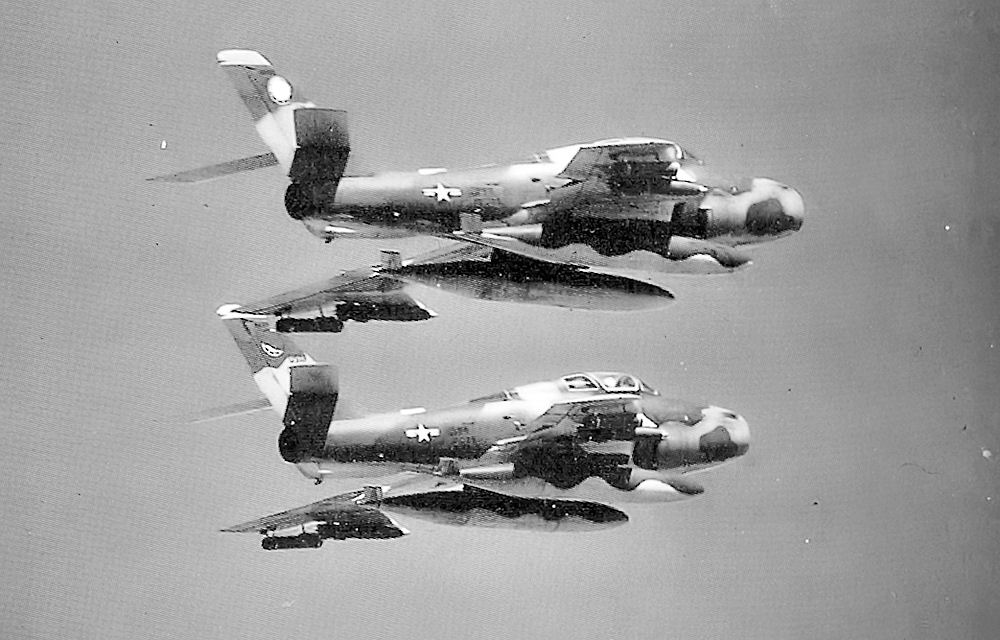
Two 113th Tactical Fighter Squadron F-84F Thundersteaks in Vietnam-era Camouflage livery flying in formation in 1966

In July 1959, the 113th was designated as a Tactical Fighter Squadron (Special Delivery), with a mission of the delivery of Tactical nuclear weapons. Although the 113th trained for the delivery of tactical nuclear weapons, it never had any actual nuclear weapons on hand, nor did the base at Terre Haute ever had nuclear weapon storage facilities. In 1959 and 1960 the squadron participated in exercises Dark Cloud and Pine Cone III, the latter taking place at Congaree Air Force Base, South Carolina. In the exercises, the squadron practiced delivery of tactical nuclear weapons in the fictitious country of "North Saladia". In 1960, the unit performed extremely well during the annual "Ricks's Trophy Race" between Turner Air Force Base, Georgia and Hamilton Air Force Base, California.

==== 1961 Berlin crisis ====
On 1 October 1961 the 113th and the 122d Tactical Fighter Wing was federalized and ordered to active service as part of Operation Tack Hammer, the United States response to the 1961 Berlin Crisis. Due to DOD budget restrictions, the 122d was instructed to deploy only a portion of its total strength and only the 163rd Tactical Fighter Squadron deployed to Chambley-Bussières Air Base, France, with the other two squadrons being on active duty at their home stations, ready to reinforce the 163rd if necessary.

On 6 November, twenty-six F-84F Thunderstreaks arrived at Chambley, with the wings support aircraft (C-47 and T-33A's) arriving by mid-November. Due to its reduced force structure, the wing was designated the 7122d Tactical Wing. By 1 December the ground support units arrived and the 7122d prepared for an estimated overseas deployment of 10 months.

Rotations of Air National Guard pilots from the stateside squadrons in Indiana was performed to train them in local flying conditions in Europe. This allowed the 163rd to maintain 100 percent manning and also to relieve the boredom of the national guard pilots on active duty in CONUS and kept them connected to the overseas part of the wing.

The mission of the 7122d was to support Seventeenth Air Force and various NATO exercises in Europe, flying up to 30 sorties a day exercising with Seventh Army units in West Germany. NATO exchanges with the West German 32d Fighter-Bomber Wing occurred in April 1962 to increase understanding of NATO air integration and terminology.

By April, the Berlin Crisis appeared to be settled and the Kennedy Administration was interested in saving money on this emergency call-up of national guard units. On 7 June the 163rd was directed to return to CONUS with all personnel, however the aircraft and equipment were to remain at Chambley.

The support C-47 and T-33s were flown back to Indiana, and in July the Air National Guardsmen of the 122 TFW/163 TFS returned to CONUS. On 16 July the 7122nd Tactical Wing was discontinued with its F-84F aircraft being turned over to the new 366th Tactical Fighter Wing. The Guardsmen were released from active duty and returned to Indiana state control, 31 August 1962.

==== Tactical Air Command ====
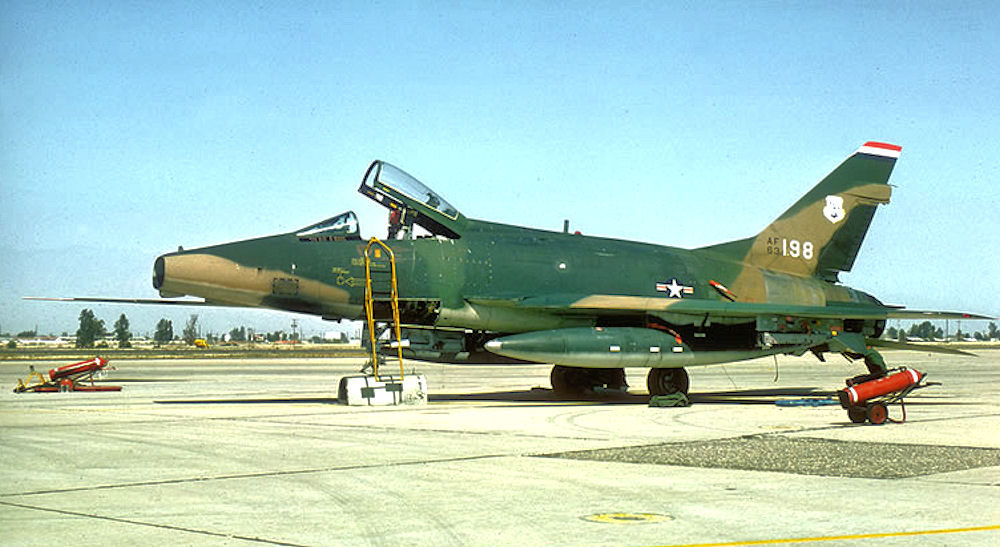
113th Tactical Fighter Squadron – North American F-100D-75-NA Super Sabre 56-3198 in Vietnam War camouflage livery.

After the Berlin Federalization, the 113th transferred its 25 F-84Fs to the active-duty USAF to fill gaps in TAC wings; the aircraft being temporally replaced by RF-84Fs from the 363d Tactical Reconnaissance Wing at Shaw Air Force Base, South Carolina that was upgrading to the RF-101 Voodoo. The squadron flew the RF-84F until May 1964 to maintain proficiency but did not train in photo-reconnaissance.

On 1 October 1962, the 113th was authorized to expand to a group level, and the 181st Tactical Fighter Group was established. The 113th became the group's flying squadron. Other elements assigned into the group were the 181st group headquarters, 181st Material Squadron (maintenance and supply), 181st Combat Support Squadron, and the 181st USAF Dispensary.

Re-equipped with F-84Fs, in 1965, the 181st TFG deployed to Hickam Air Force Base, Hawaii for Exercise Tropic Lighting I, an exercise designed to assist in the training of Army ground units prior to their deployment to South Vietnam. This deployment required two over-water air refuelings in either direction. In addition, the 113th deployed to Vincent AFB, Arizona for extensive gunnery, rocketry and special weapons delivery training.

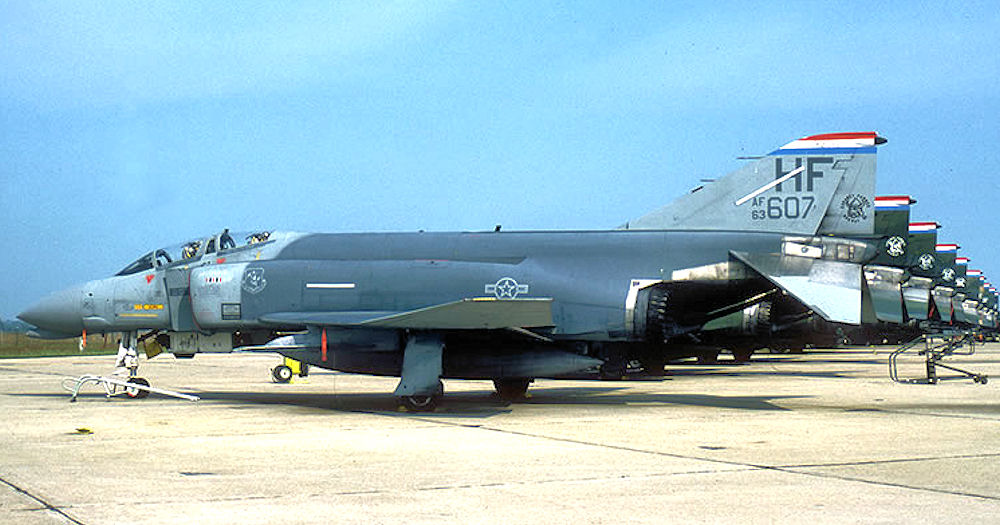
Row of 113th TFS F-4Cs painted in Hill One and Euro One schemes, Tactical Air Command at Hulman Field, 1988.

The F-84F remained with the 181st until December 1971, when they were retired to AMARC and replaced by North American F-100C/D Super Sabres following their withdrawal from the Vietnam War. The F-100 remained with the squadron until 1979 and participated in numerous deployments and exercises. In April 1976, the squadron deployed to RAF Lakenheath, England as part of Cornet Prize, and was awarded an Air Force Outstanding Unit Award for the period October 1975 to May 1976. The unit had the honor to fly the last active United States Military F-100 mission when it flew F-100D 56-2979 to MASDC (now AMARC), Davis-Monthan Air Force Base, Arizona, in November 1979.

In the summer of 1979 the unit had begun conversion to the F-4C Phantom II (actual aircraft were Vietnam War EF-4C Wild Weasel aircraft which had been de-modified). By 1 April 1988 the unit had completed its conversion to more the advanced F-4E version of the Phantom II. However, the squadron was not assigned the specialized Wild Weasel mission, and it operated its F-4Cs in the conventional strike role. With the receipt of the Phantoms in 1979, the 113th began using Tactical Air Command Tail Code "HF" on their aircraft (Hulman Field). The 113th initially operated the F-4Cs in a tactical role. In addition, they served in the air defense role as part of the Air National Guard taking over the mission of the inactivated Aerospace Defense Command for continental air defense. In the air defense role, the squadron operated under Air Defense, Tactical Air Command, a named unit that operated at the numbered air force level of TAC.

==== Air Combat Command ====
Beginning in April 1991 the unit started its conversion to ex USAFE 50th Tactical Fighter Wing Block 25 F-16C/Ds (the last Phantoms left in October 1991) and completed this on 1 July 1992 when the last F-16 left Hahn Air Base prior to its closure. With the changeover to the F-16, the squadron changed its Tail Code to "TH" (Terre Haute).

In 1992, the unit designation changed to 113th Fighter Squadron, 181st Fighter Group (15 March 1992) and in June its gaining command changed from Tactical Air Command to Air Combat Command (1 June 1992). On 1 October 1995 the 181st Fighter Group was changed in status to a Wing, this being part of the Air Force's One-Base, One-Wing requirement.

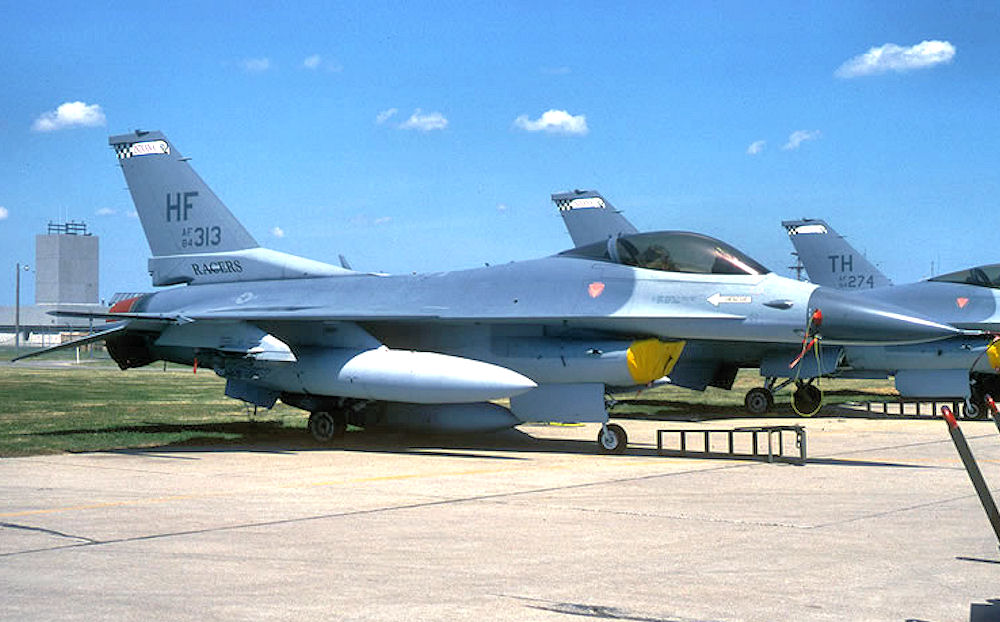
Newly received Block 25 F-16 Fighting Falcons in April 1991. (Note: Note the changeover of tail codes from HF to TH, with both applied to different F-16s parked on the tarmac.)

In mid-1996, the Air Force, in response to budget cuts, and changing world situations, began experimenting with Air Expeditionary organizations. The Air Expeditionary Force (AEF) concept was developed that would mix Active-Duty, Reserve and Air National Guard elements into a combined force. Instead of entire permanent units deploying as "Provisional" as in the 1991 Gulf War, Expeditionary units are composed of "aviation packages" from several wings, including active-duty Air Force, the Air Force Reserve Command and the Air National Guard, would be married together to carry out the assigned deployment rotation.

Since equipping with F-16s the Racers (The 113th's nickname coming from the proximity of Terre Haute to the Indianapolis 500 racetrack) have participated in a humanitarian deployment to Romania, provided security for the 1996 Summer Olympic Games and have deployed in support of Operation Southern Watch (operating from Ahmad al-Jaber Air Base, Kuwait) and Operation Northern Watch (from Incirlik Air Base, Turkey). Additionally, the Unit received exceptional ratings on a number of higher headquarters evaluations.

The 113th swapped their Block 25 F-16C/Ds for Block 30s in July/August 1995 and flew those aircraft until 2008. The units vipers were equipped with the LITENING targeting pod, a precision targeting pod system designed for Air Force Reserve's and Air National Guard's F-16 Block 25/30/32 Fighting Falcons. This precision targeting system significantly increases the combat effectiveness of the F-16 during day, night and under-the-weather conditions in the attack of ground targets with a variety of standoff weapons.

==== Global war on terrorism ====
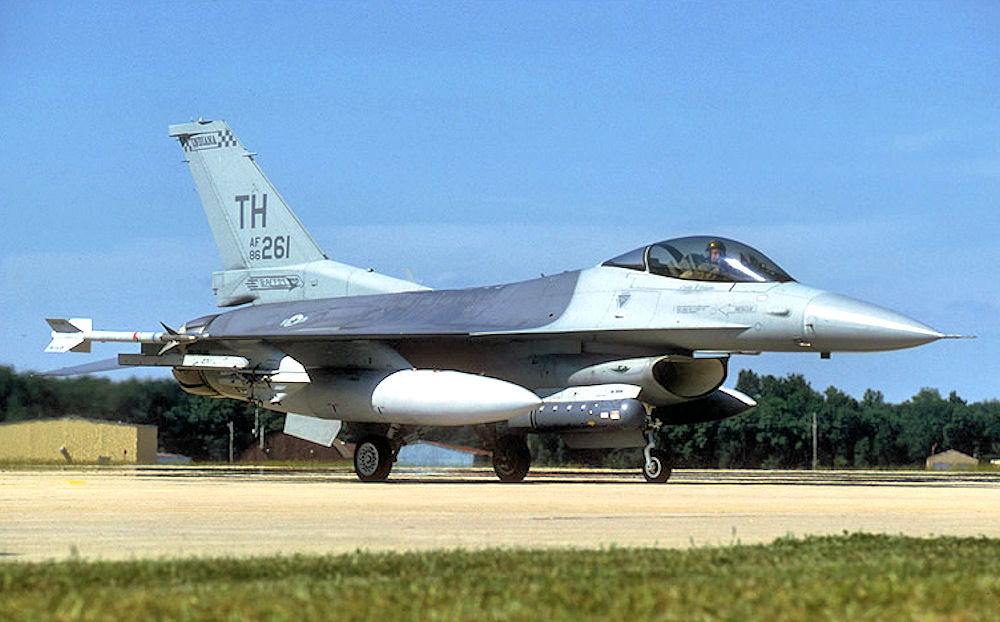
113th Fighter Squadron Block 30 F-16C 86-0261 in 2000

On 11 September 2001, the 181st Fighter Wing wasted no time in joining the war on terrorism as it responded after the attack on the World Trade Center and The Pentagon in less than four hours to the task of flying Combat Air Patrols over the Midwest as part of Operation Noble Eagle.

The 181st Fighter Wing drastically increased its operations tempo during the early 2000s to guard America's skies and protect freedom. The 181st deployed members and equipment to 19 countries to simultaneously support seven different military operations, including: Operation Southern Watch, Operation Northern Watch, Operation Joint Forge, Operation Noble Eagle, Operation Deep Freeze, Operation Enduring Freedom and Operation Iraqi Freedom.

==== Air support operations ====
In 2005, the Base Realignment and Closure commission mandated the end of the flying era for the 181st. On 8 September 2007, the 181st Fighter Wing flew their last training mission out of Hulman Field International Airport. The Block 30 F-16 aircraft were reassigned to the 177th Fighter Wing, New Jersey Air National Guard at Atlantic City Air National Guard Base in September 2007.

A realignment was directed with two new Air Force missions: a Distributive Ground Station (DGS) and an Air Support Operations Squadron. On 3 May 2008 the 181st Fighter Wing was redesignated as the 181st Intelligence Wing.

The DGS is an intelligence based mission, monitoring near real time video feed from Predators, Global Hawks and other unmanned aerial vehicles hovering the skies over any military area of operation. The servicemembers will process, exploit, and disseminate the video feed, providing actionable intelligence to the ground commanders and war-fighting forces.

The ASOS will bring unity to joint forces fighting in the global war on terrorism. Their mission is to advise the ground commanders on the best way to utilize U.S. and NATO assets for close air support.

== Lineage ==
113th Aero Squadron

- Organized as the 113th Aero Squadron on 26 August 1917

Redesignated: 634th Aero Squadron (Supply) on 1 February 1918
Demobilized on 31 March 1919
Reconstituted on 20 October 1936 and consolidated with the 113th Observation Squadron as the 113th Observation Squadron

113th Air Support Operations Squadron

- Constituted in the National Guard on 25 August 1921 as the 137th Squadron (Observation)

Organized on 1 August 1921 (Note: Per Maurer. Clay indicates the squadron was organized in February 1921, but did not receive federal recognition until 1 August.)
Redesignated 113th Squadron (Observation) on 3 January 1923
Redesignated 113th Observation Squadron on 25 January 1923
Consolidated with the 634th Aero Squadron on 20 October 1936
Redesignated: 113th Observation Squadron (Medium) on 13 January 1942
Redesignated: 113th Observation Squadron on 4 July 1942
Redesignated: 113th Reconnaissance Squadron (Bombardment) on 2 April 1943
Redesignated: 113th Reconnaissance Squadron (Fighter) on 15 June 1943
Redesignated: 113th Tactical Reconnaissance Squadron on 11 August 1943
Disbanded on 30 November 1943

- Reconstituted on 21 June 1945

Redesignated 113th Fighter Squadron, Single Engine and allotted to the National Guard on 24 May 1946
Extended federal recognition on 9 December 1946
Federalized and ordered to active service on 10 February 1951
Redesignated 113th Fighter-Interceptor Squadron on 10 February 1951
Released from active duty and returned to Indiana state control on 1 November 1952
Redesignated 113th Fighter-Bomber Squadron and activated c. 1 February 1953
Redesignated 113th Tactical Fighter Squadron (Special Delivery) on 1 July 1959
Federalized and ordered to active service on 1 October 1961
Released from active duty and returned to Indiana state control on 31 August 1962
Redesignated 113th Tactical Fighter Squadron on 1 September 1962
Redesignated: 113th Fighter Squadron on 15 March 1992
Redesignated: 113th Air Support Operations Squadron on 3 May 2008

=== Assignments ===
- Post Headquarters, Kelly Field, 26 August – 15 September 1917
- Aviation General Supply Depot, 15 September 1917 – 31 March 1919
- 333d Observation Group, 1 August 1921
- 38th Division Air Service (later 38th Division Aviation), 3 January 1923
- Indiana National Guard (attached to the 38th Division), 15 February 1929
- 45th Observation Group, 1 October 1933 – November 1940
- V Corps, 30 December 1940
- 67th Observation Group, 1 September 1941 (attached to 66th Observation Group, 12 December 1941 – 20 January 1942)
- 77th Observation Group (later 77th Reconnaissance Group, 77th Tactical Reconnaissance Group), 12 March 1942 – 30 November 1943
- 122d Fighter Group (later 122d Fighter-Interceptor Group), 9 December 1946
- 4706th Defense Wing, 6 February 1952
- 33d Air Division, 1 April 1952
- 122d Fighter-Bomber Group (later 122d Tactical Fighter Group), c. 1 February 1953
- 122d Tactical Fighter Wing (attached to 7122d Tactical Wing until 31 August 1962), 1 October 1961
- 181st Tactical Fighter Group (later 181st Fighter Group), 1 October 1962
- 181st Operations Group, 1 October 1995
- 181st Intelligence Wing, 3 May 2008 – present

=== Stations ===
- Kelly Field, Texas, 26 August 1917
- Olmsted Field, Pennsylvania, 15 September 1917 – 31 March 1919
- Fagley Field, 1 August 1921
- Stout Field, Indiana, 10 June 1926
- Key Field, Mississippi, 27 January 1941
- MacDill Field, Florida, 16 December 1941
- Key Field, Mississippi, 27 January 1942
- New Orleans Army Air Base, Louisiana, 5 February 1942
- Hattiesburg Army Air Field, Mississippi, 23 June 1942
- Stinson Field, Texas, 6 July 1942
- DeRidder Army Air Base, Louisiana, 27 July 1942
- Alamo Field, Texas, 28 September 1942
- Abilene Army Air Field, Texas, 1 July 1943
- Esler Field, Louisiana, 13 September 1943
- Birmingham Army Air Field, Alabama, 14–30 November 1943
- Stout Field, Indiana, 9 December 1946
- Baer Field, Indiana, March 1951
- Scott Air Force Base, Illinois, 1 May 1951 – 1 November 1952
- Hulman Field, Indiana, 1 January 1954
- Chambley-Bussières Air Base, France, 1 October 1961
- Hulman Field (later Terre Haute Air National Guard Base), Indiana, 31 August 1962 – present

=== Aircraft ===
- Curtiss JN-6 during period 1921–1933
- Curtiss JNS-1 during period 1921–1933
- Consolidated PT-1 Trusty during period 1921–1933
- Douglas BT-1 during period 1921–1933
- Douglas O-2 during period 1921–1933
- Curtiss O-11 during period 1921–1933
- Consolidated O-17 Courier during period 1921–1933
- Douglas O-38B, C. 1932–1941
- North American O-47, C. 1938–1942
- Stinson O-49 Vigilant, 1941–1942
- Curtiss O-52 Owl, 1941–1942
- Piper L-4 Grasshopper, 1942
- Bell P-39 Airacobra, 1942–1943
- North American P-51D Mustang (later F-51), 1946–1951
- North American F-51H Mustang, 1951–1954
- Lockheed F-80C Shooting Star, 1954–1956
- North American F-86A Sabre, 1956–1958
- Republic F-84F Thunderstreak, 1958–1962; 1964–1971
- Republic RF-84F Thunderflash, 1962–1964
- North American F-100D Super Sabre, 1971–1979
- North American F-100F Super Sabre, 1971–1979
- McDonnell F-4C Phantom II, 1979–1987
- McDonnell F-4E Phantom II, 1987–1991
- General Dynamics F-16C Fighting Falcon, 1991–2007
- General Dynamics F-16D Fighting Falcon, 1991–2007

== See also ==
- List of American aero squadrons
- List of observation squadrons of the United States Army National Guard
