= Mark D. Stillwagon =

United States Air Force general

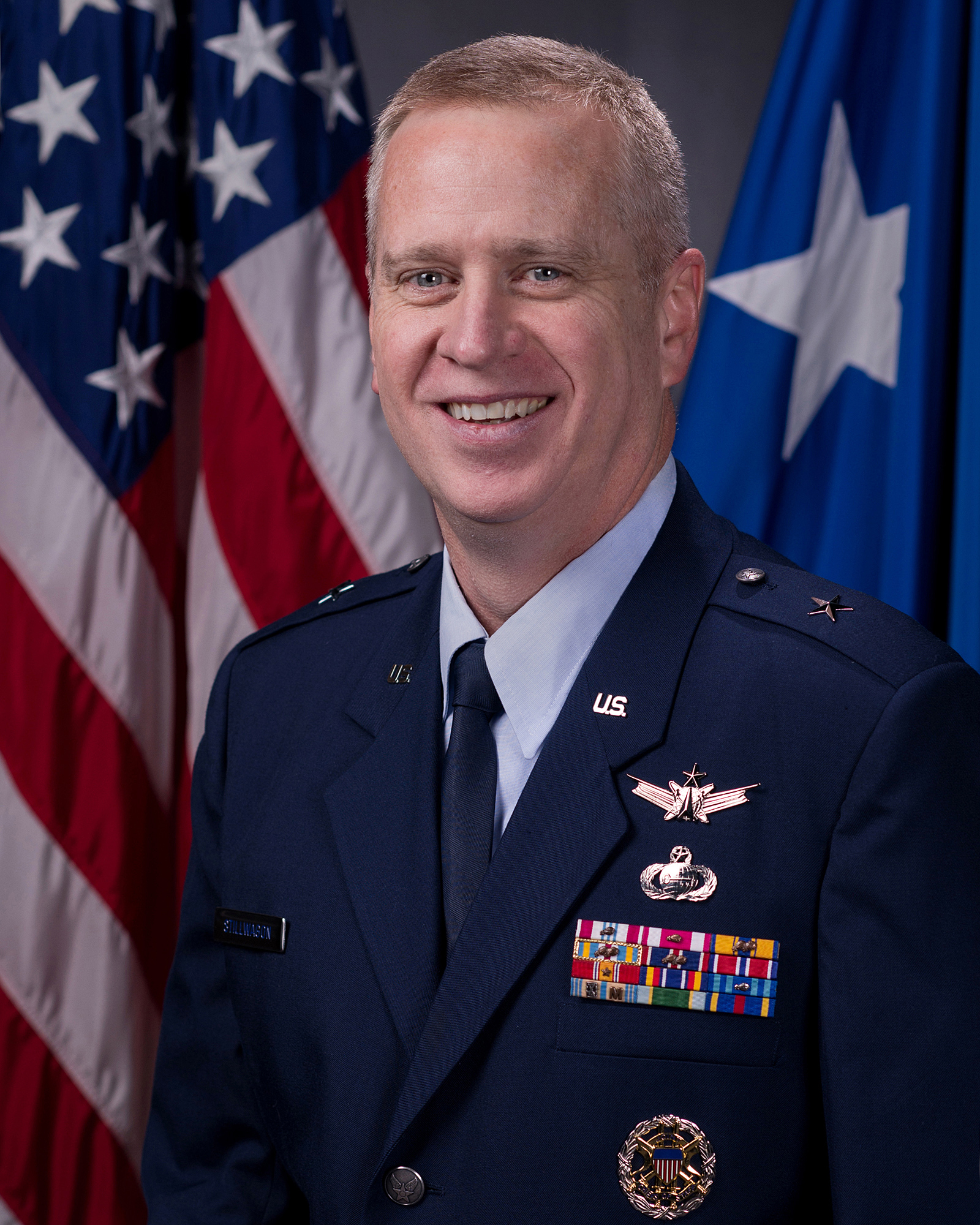
- Brigadier General Mark D. Stillwagon
- Born: 1962 (age 63–64); Milwaukee, Wisconsin
- Military career
- Allegiance: United States
- Branch: United States Air Force
- Service years: 1985-2017
- Rank: Brigadier General
- Conflicts: Operation Enduring Freedom; Operation Noble Eagle; Operation Northern Watch
- Awards: Defense Superior Service Medal; Defense Meritorious Service Medal (2); Meritorious Service Medal (3); Commendation Medal (3)

Mark D. Stillwagon is a retired United States Air Force brigadier general who served from 1985 until 2017. He served in various operational and staff assignments at the squadron, wing, center, major command, Combat Support Agency, and joint levels while on active duty and as a member of the Air National Guard and United States Air Force Reserve. Deployments include Venezuela as part of a cooperative Combat Search and Rescue training effort and Incirlik Air Base, Turkey, in support of Operation Northern Watch. In the wake of 9/11, the general was assigned to the Joint Staff to direct targeting and battle damage assessment activities during Operation Enduring Freedom.

== Early years ==
Stillwagon was born in Milwaukee, Wisconsin, and raised in Cambridge Springs, Pennsylvania. He graduated from Cambridge Springs High School in 1980 and from the University of Pittsburgh in 1984. He was commissioned a second lieutenant upon graduating Officer Training School in July, 1985.

== Education ==
- 1984 Bachelor of Arts degree in economics, University of Pittsburgh, Pittsburgh, Pa.
- 1989 Squadron Officer School, by correspondence
- 1992 Master of Public Administration degree, California State University, Dominguez Hills, Carson, Calif.
- 1998 Air Command and Staff College, by correspondence
- 2003 Air War College, by correspondence
- 2012 U.S. Air Force Leadership Enhancement Program, Center for Creative Leadership, Greensboro, N.C.
- 2014 AFSO-21 Executive Leadership Course, University of Tennessee, Knoxville
- 2014 Senior Leader Orientation Course, Joint Base Andrews, Md.

== Assignments ==
Sources:

- August 1985 – March 1986, Student, Armed Forces Air Intelligence Technical Training Center, Lowry Air Force Base, Colo.
- March 1986 – August 1987, Chief, Target Processing Branch, 416th Bombardment Wing (Hvy), Griffiss Air Force Base, N.Y.
- August 1987 – December 1989, Assistant Chief, Target Intelligence Branch, 416th Bombardment Wing (Hvy), Griffiss AFB, N.Y.
- January 1990 – March 1991, Foreign Space Analyst, Headquarters Space Systems Division, Los Angeles AFB, Calif.
- March 1991 – June 1991, Chief Operations Intelligence Branch, Headquarters Space Systems Division, Los Angeles AFB, Calif.
- June 1991 – June 1992, Assistant Chief, Intelligence Support Division, Headquarters Space and Missile Systems Center, Los Angeles AFB, Calif.
- June 1992 – December 1992, Chief, Intelligence Support Division, Headquarters Space and Missile Systems Center, Los Angeles AFB, Calif.
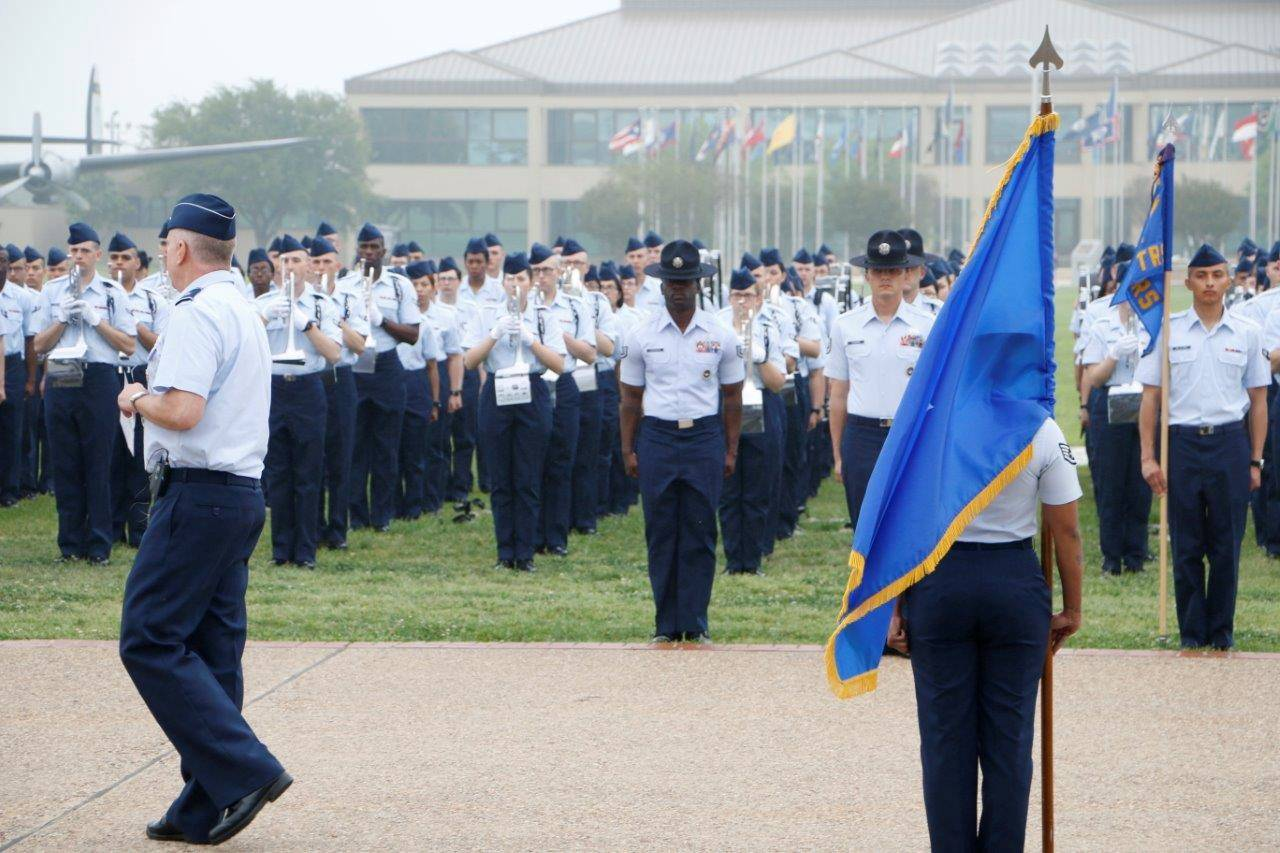
  Stillwagon at a 2015 USAF Basic Military Training graduation ceremony.
- January 1993 – June 1996, Assistant Director of Intelligence, 129th Rescue Wing, Moffett Federal Airfield, Calif.
- July 1996 – September 1998, Director of Intelligence, 305th Rescue Squadron, Davis-Monthan AFB, Ariz. (May-Jul 1997. Chief of Intelligence, 939 RQW Deployed, Incirlik AB Turkey)
- October 1998 – November 1999, Eurasia Analyst, National Military Joint Intelligence Center, Pentagon, Washington, D.C.

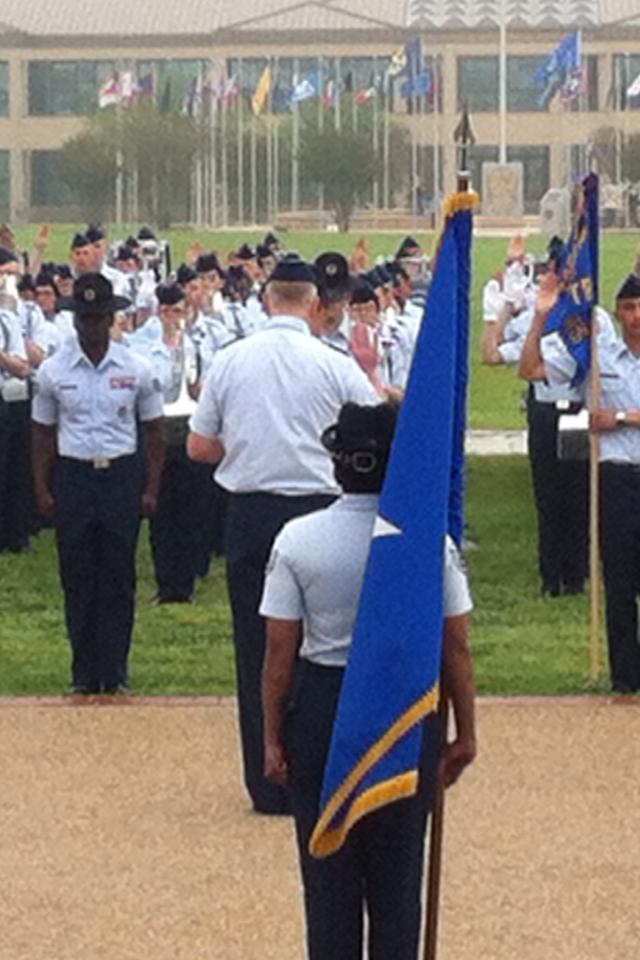
Stillwagon administers the oath of enlistment to America's newest Airmen.

- November 1999 – September 2001, Assistant Deputy Director for Intelligence, National Military Joint Intelligence Center, Pentagon, Washington, D.C.
- October 2001 – September 2002, Chief, Crisis Targeting and Battle Damage Assessment Cell (Operation Enduring Freedom), Joint Staff Directorate for Intelligence, J2, Pentagon, Washington, D.C.

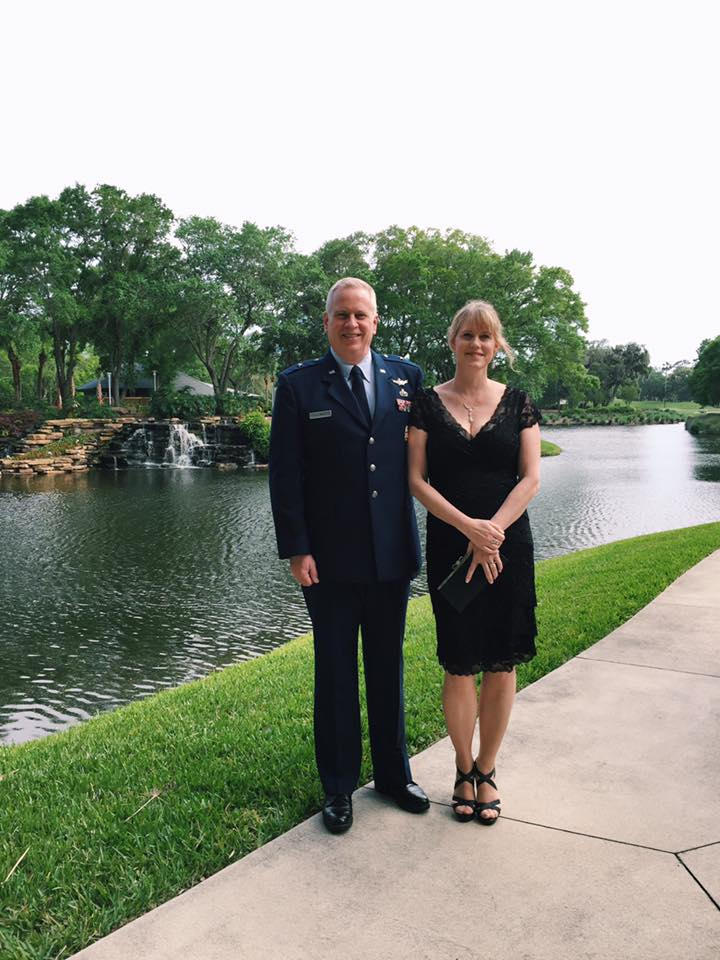
General and Mrs. Stillwagon at an Air Force senior leadership event in 2016.

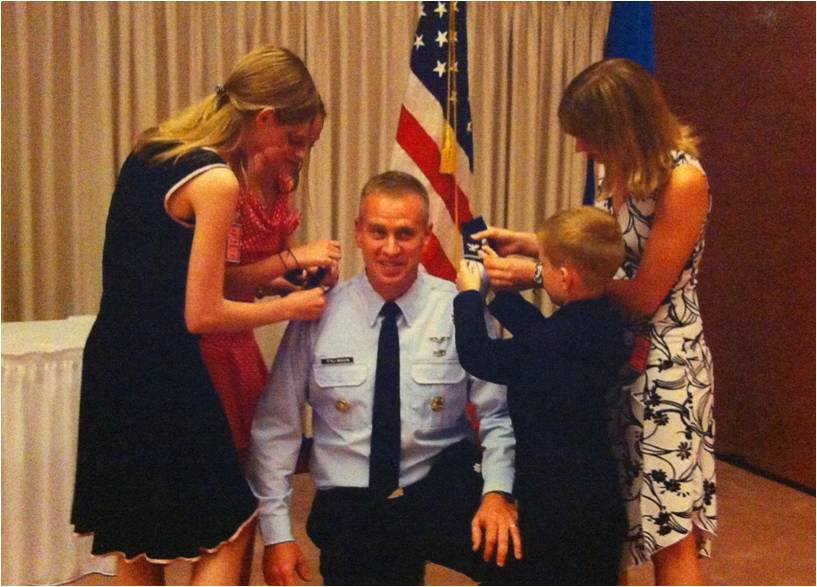
Stillwagon's children pin on colonel rank in 2004

- October 2002 – May 2004, Deputy Director for Intelligence, National Military Joint Intelligence Center, Pentagon, Washington, D.C.
- May 2004 – May 2005, Director of Operations, Joint Reserve Intelligence Unit, Joint Staff Directorate for Intelligence, J2, Pentagon, Washington, D.C.
- May 2005 – May 2006, Deputy Commander, Joint Reserve Intelligence Unit, Joint Staff Directorate for Intelligence, J2, Pentagon, Washington, D.C.
- June 2006 – June 2008, Director, Reserve ISR Forces, Defense Intelligence Agency, Washington, D.C.
- June 2008 – December 2009, Individual Mobilization Augmentee to the Commander, National Air and Space Intelligence Center, Wright Patterson AFB, Ohio
- January 2010 – February 2014, Mobilization Assistant to the Commander, Air Force Intelligence, Surveillance and Reconnaissance Agency, Joint Base San Antonio – Lackland AFB, Texas
- February 2014 – May 2017, Assistant Director of Intelligence, Headquarters U.S. European Command, Stuttgart-Vaihingen, Germany

== Summary of joint assignments ==
- October 1998 – November 1999, Eurasia Analyst, National Military Joint Intelligence Center, Joint Staff, Pentagon, Washington, D.C., as a major
- November 1999 – September 2001, Assistant Deputy Director for Intelligence, National Military Joint Intelligence Center, Joint Staff, the Pentagon, Washington, D.C., as a major and lieutenant colonel
- October 2001 – September 2002, Chief, Crisis Targeting and Battle Damage Assessment Cell (Operation Enduring Freedom), Directorate for Intelligence, J2, Joint Staff, the Pentagon, Washington, D.C., as a lieutenant colonel
- October 2002 – May 2004, Deputy Director for Intelligence, National Military Joint Intelligence Center, Joint Staff, Pentagon, Washington, D.C., as a lieutenant colonel and colonel
- May 2004 – May 2005, Director of Operations, Joint Reserve Intelligence Unit, Directorate for Intelligence, J2, Joint Staff, the Pentagon, Washington, D.C., as a colonel
- May 2005 – May 2006, Deputy Commander, Joint Reserve Intelligence Unit, Directorate for Intelligence, J2, Joint Staff, the Pentagon, Washington, D.C., as a colonel
- February 2014 – May 2017, Assistant Director of Intelligence, Headquarters U.S. European Command, Stuttgart-Vaihingen, Germany, as a brigadier general

== Major awards and decorations ==

Joint Chiefs of Staff Badge

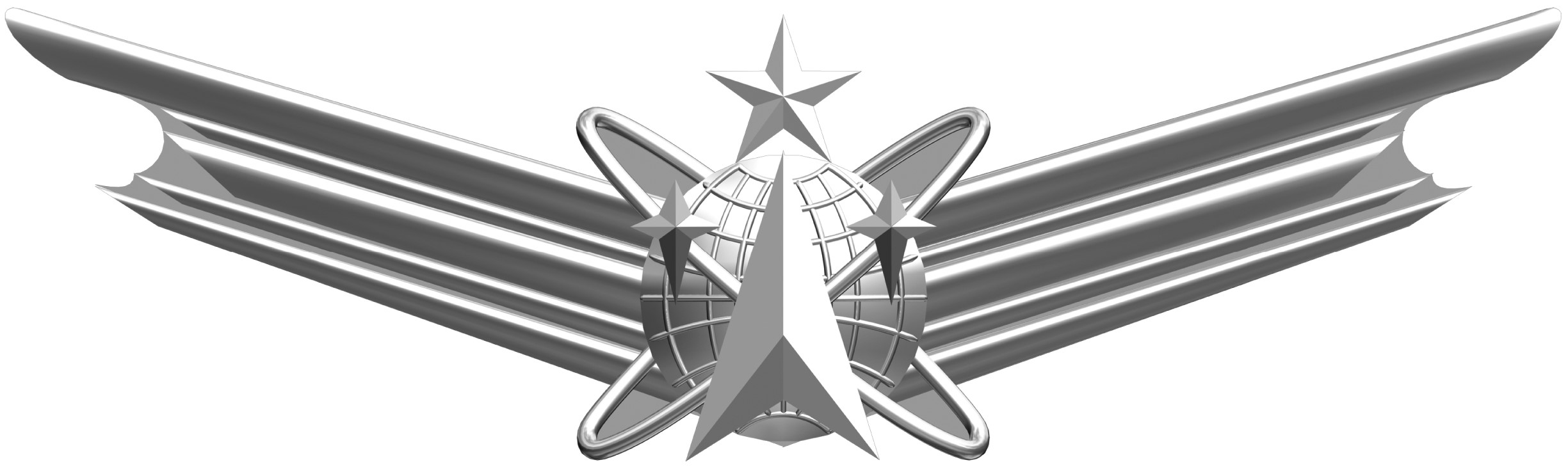

Senior Space Operations Badge

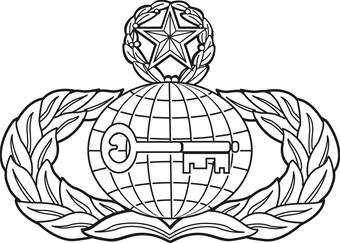

Master Intelligence Badge
Defense Superior Service Medal
Defense Meritorious Service Medal with bronze oak leaf cluster
Meritorious Service Medal with two bronze oak leaf clusters
Air Force Commendation Medal with two bronze oak leaf clusters
Joint Meritorious Unit Award with two bronze oak leaf clusters
Air Force Outstanding Unit Award with two bronze oak leaf clusters
Air Force Organizational Excellence Award
National Defense Service Medal with bronze service star
Global War on Terrorism Service Medal
Air Force Longevity Service Award with silver and 3 bronze oak leaf clusters
Armed Forces Reserve Medal with bronze Hourglass and M Device
Small Arms Expert Marksmanship Ribbon
Air Force Training Ribbon

== Effective dates of promotion ==
Insignia	Rank	Date
	Brigadier general	January 1, 2013
	Colonel	February 6, 2004
	Lieutenant colonel	September 29, 2000
	Major	August 5, 1995
	Captain	July 30, 1989
	First lieutenant	July 30, 1987
	Second lieutenant	July 30. 1985

== See also ==
- United States Air Force generals
