= 181st Intelligence Wing =

181st Intelligence Wing
- Active: 1962 – present
- Country: United States
- Allegiance: Indiana
- Branch: Air National Guard
- Type: Wing
- Role: Intelligence analysis and information protection
- Part of: Indiana Air National Guard
- Garrison/HQ: Terre Haute Air National Guard Base, Indiana
- Nickname: Racers
- Decorations: Air Force Outstanding Unit Award

Commanders
- Current commander: Col. Charles T. Goad

Insignia
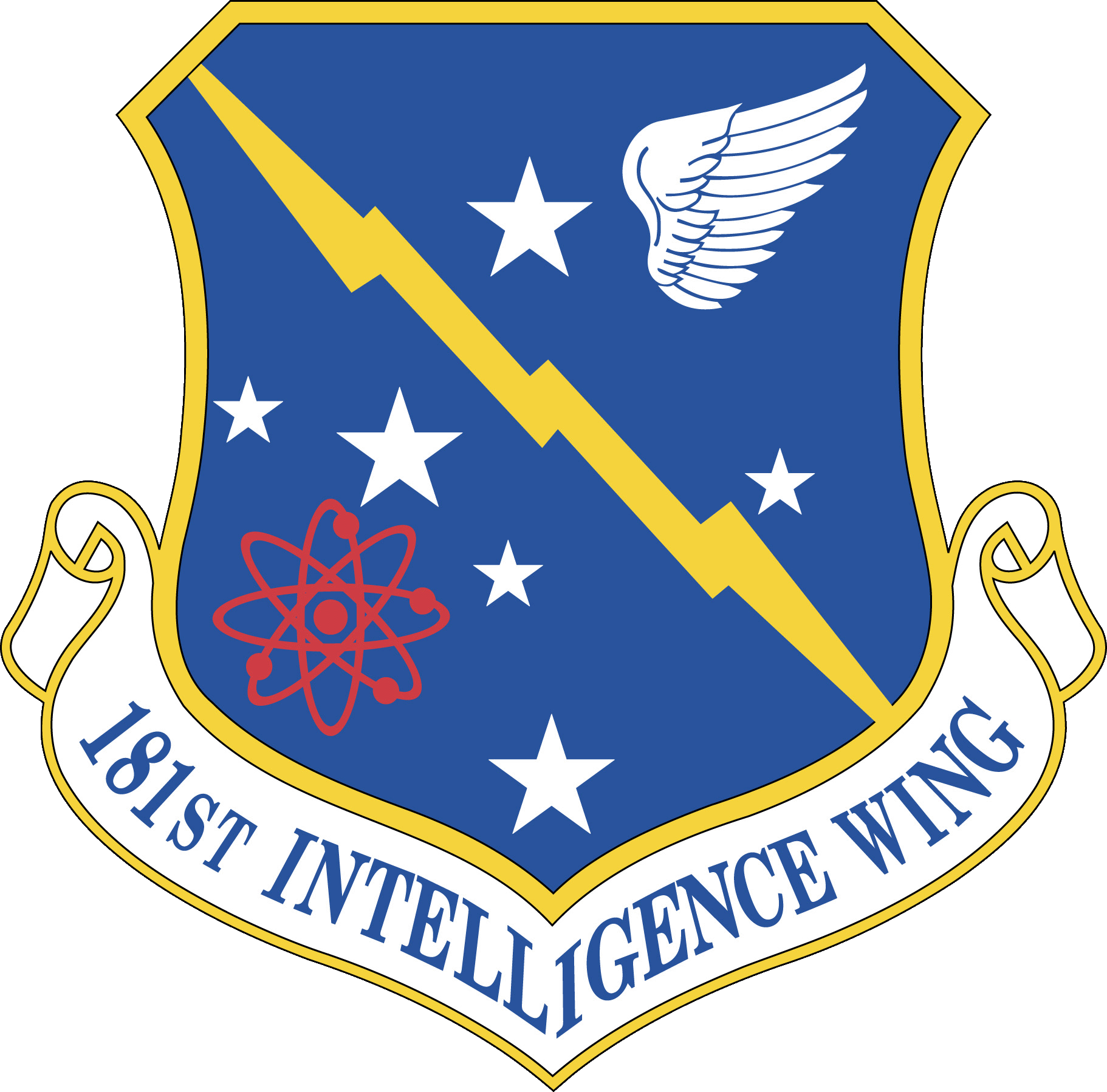
- 181st Intelligence Wing emblem

The 181st Intelligence Wing is a unit of the Indiana Air National Guard, stationed at Terre Haute Air National Guard Base, Indiana. If activated to federal service, the Wing is gained by the United States Air Force Intelligence, Surveillance and Reconnaissance Agency.

The Wing's 113th Air Support Operations Squadron is a descendant organization of the World War I 113th Aero Squadron, established on 26 August 1917. It was reformed on 1 August 1921, as the 113th Observation Squadron, and is one of the 29 original National Guard Observation Squadrons of the United States Army National Guard formed before World War II.

== Mission ==
The 181st Intelligence Wing is one of three Air National Guard Wings that work with the Air Force Intelligence, Surveillance and Reconnaissance Agency; being equipped with the AN/GSQ-272 Sentinel Distributed Common Ground System.

Intelligence analysts of the wing monitor data from manned and unmanned assets throughout the world producing actionable intelligence in support of worldwide contingency operation and senior government officials.

== Units ==
The 181st Intelligence Wing consists of the following units:

- 181st Mission Support Group
- 181st Intelligence Group
- 181st Medical Group
- 113th Air Support Operations Squadron
- 137th Intelligence Squadron

== History ==
On 1 October 1962, the Indiana Air National Guard 113th Tactical Fighter Squadron was authorized to expand to a group level, and the 181st Tactical Fighter Group was established by the National Guard Bureau. The 113th Taxtical Fighter Squadron becoming the group's flying squadron. Other squadrons assigned into the group were the 181st Headquarters, 181st Material Squadron (Maintenance), 181st Combat Support Squadron, and the 181st USAF Dispensary. The 113th was temporarily equipped with RF-84F Thunderstreaks photo-reconnaissance aircraft to allow its pilots to maintain proficiency. In 1964, the squadron received F-84F Thunderstreak tactical fighter-bombers.

=== Tactical Air Command ===
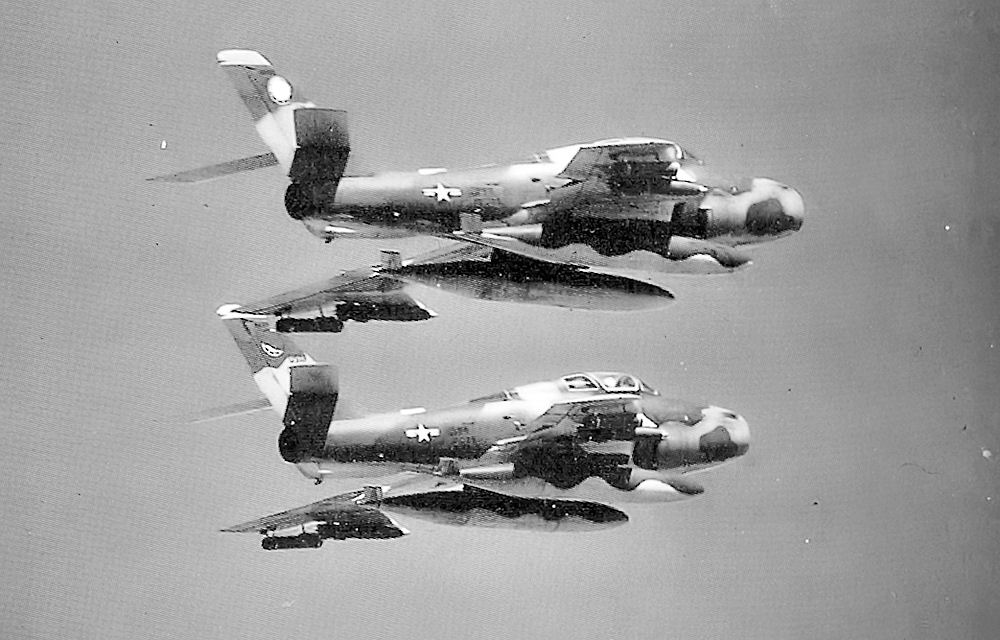
113th TFS F-84F Thunderstreaks during Tropic Lighting I, 1965

Re-equipped with F-84Fs, in 1965, the 181st TFG deployed to Hickam Air Force Base, Hawaii for Tropic Lighting I, an exercise designed to assist in the training of Army ground units prior to their deployment to South Vietnam. This deployment required two over-water air refuelings in either direction. In addition, the 113th deployed to Vincent Air Force Base, Arizona for extensive gunnery, rocketry and special weapons delivery training.

The F-84F remained with the 181st until December 1971, when they were retired to AMARC and replaced by North American F-100C/D Super Sabres following their withdrawal from the Vietnam War. The F-100 remained with the squadron until 1979 and participated in numerous deployments and exercises. In April 1976, the squadron deployed to RAF Lakenheath, England as part of Cornet Prize, and was awarded an Air Force Outstanding Unit Award for the period October 1975 to May 1976. The unit had the honor to fly the last active United States Military F-100 mission when it flew F-100D 56–2979 to MASDC (now AMARC), Davis-Monthan Air Force Base, Arizona, in November 1979.

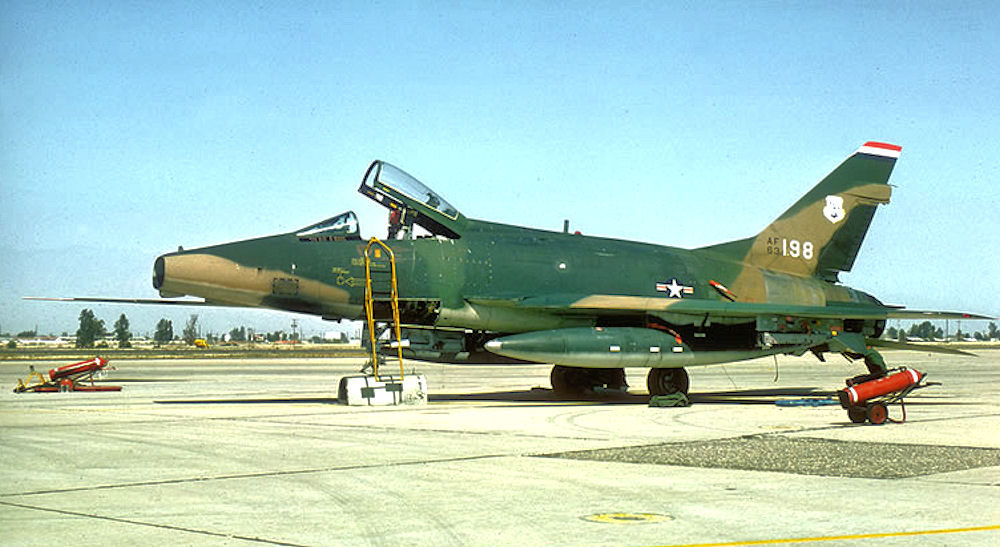
F-100D in Vietnam War camouflage, 1971

In the summer of 1979 the unit had begun conversion to the F-4C Phantom II (actual aircraft were Vietnam War EF-4C Wild Weasel aircraft which had been de-modified). By 1 April 1988 the unit had completed its conversion to more the advanced F-4E version of the Phantom II. However, the squadron was not assigned the specialized Wild Weasel mission, and it operated its F-4Cs in the conventional strike role. With the receipt of the Phantoms in 1979, the 113th began using Tactical Air Command Tail Code "HF" on their aircraft (Hulman Field). The 113th initially operated the F-4Cs in a tactical role. In addition, they served in the air defense role as part of the Air National Guard taking over the mission of the inactivated Aerospace Defense Command for continental air defense. In the air defense role, the squadron operated under Air Defense, Tactical Air Command (ADTAC), a named unit that operated at the numbered air force level of TAC.

=== Air Combat Command ===
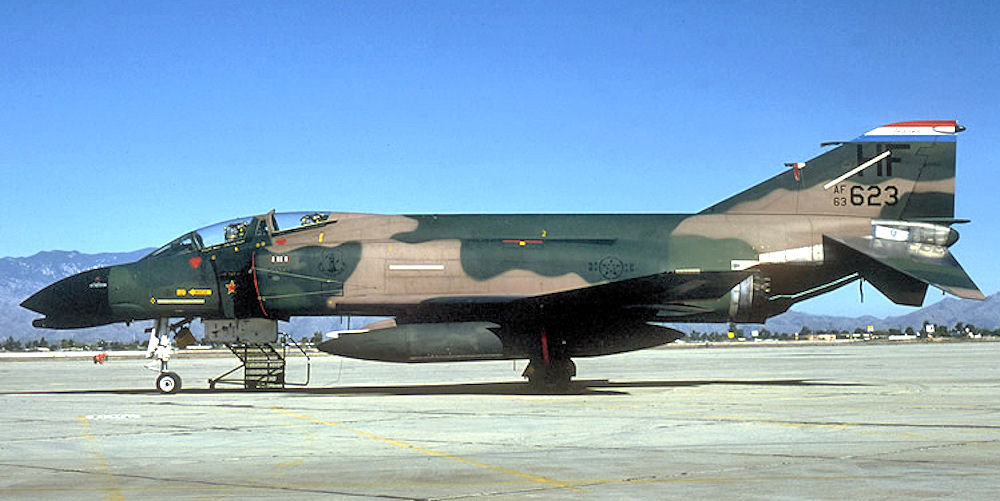
113th Tactical Fighter Squadron F-4C Phantom II, circa 1979 (Note: Aircraft is McDonnell F-4C-20-MC Phantom II, serial 63-7623. Note one MiG Kill star on intake from its Vietnam War combat with the active duty Air Force.)

Beginning in April 1991 the unit started its conversion to ex USAFE 50th Tactical Fighter Wing Block 25 F-16C/Ds (the last Phantoms left in October 1991) and completed this on 1 July 1992 when the last F-16 left Hahn Air Base prior to its closure. With the changeover to the F-16, the squadron changed its Tail Code to "TH" (Terre Haute).

In 1992, the unit designation changed to 181st Fighter Group (15 March 1992) and in June its gaining command changed from Tactical Air Command to Air Combat Command (1 June 1992). On 1 October 1995 the 181st Fighter Group was changed in status to a Wing, this being part of the Air Force's Objective Wing reorganization.

In mid-1996, the Air Force, in response to budget cuts, and changing world situations, began experimenting with Air Expeditionary organizations. The Air Expeditionary Force concept was developed that would mix Active-Duty, Reserve and Air National Guard elements into a combined force. Instead of entire permanent units deploying as provisional as in the 1991 Gulf War, Expeditionary units are composed of "aviation packages" from several wings, including active-duty Air Force, the Air Force Reserve Command and the Air National Guard, would be married together to carry out the assigned deployment rotation.

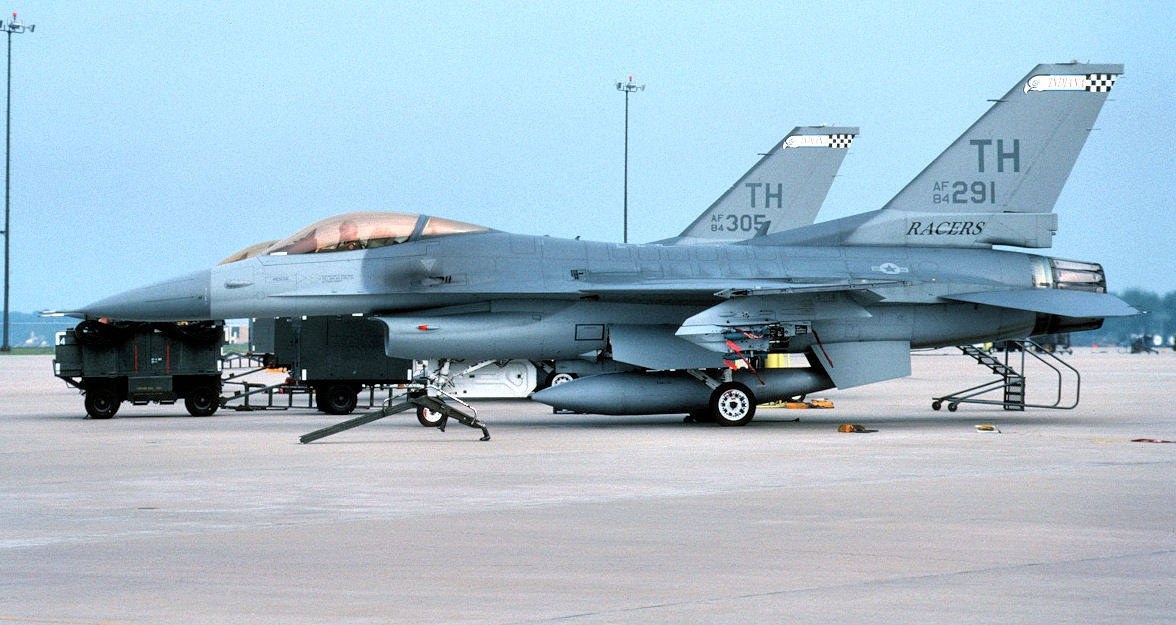
F-16C Block 25E Fighting Falcons, 1990.

Since equipping with F-16s the Racers (The 113th's nickname coming from the proximity of Terre Haute to the Indianapolis 500 racetrack) have participated in a humanitarian deployment to Romania, provided security for the 1996 Summer Olympic Games and have deployed in support of Operation Southern Watch (operating from Al Jaber Air Base, Kuwait) and Operation Northern Watch (from Incirlik Air Base, Turkey). Additionally, the Unit received exceptional ratings on a number of higher headquarters evaluations.

The 113th swapped their Block 25 F-16C/Ds for Block 30s in July/August 1995 and flew those aircraft until 2008. The unit's "vipers" were equipped with the LITENING targeting pod, a precision targeting pod system designed for Air Force Reserve's and Air National Guard's F-16 Block 25/30/32 Fighting Falcons. This precision targeting system significantly increases the combat effectiveness of the F-16 during day, night and under-the-weather conditions in the attack of ground targets with a variety of standoff weapons.

=== Global war on terrorism ===
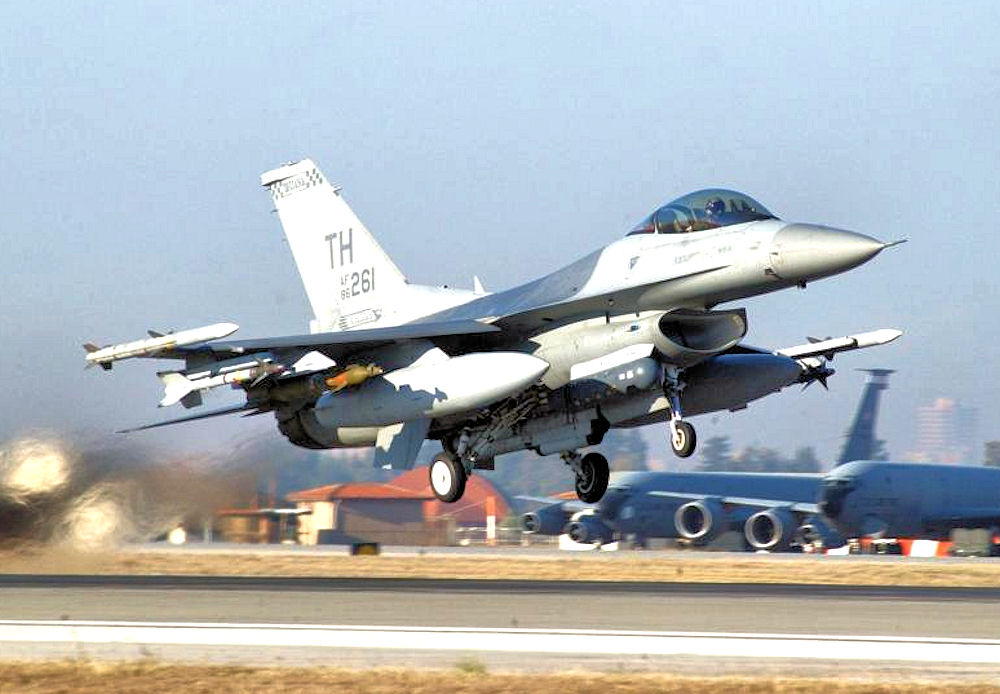
113th Expeditionary Fighter Squadron F-16C taking off from Incirlik AB, Turkey, on 22 December 2002, during operation Northern Watch (Note: Aircraft is General Dynamics F-16C Block 30C Fighting Falcon, serial 86-0261.)

On 11 September 2001, the 181st Fighter Wing wasted no time in joining the war on terrorism as it responded after the attack on the World Trade Center and The Pentagon in less than four hours to the task of flying Combat Air Patrols over the Midwest as part of Operation Noble Eagle.

The 181st Fighter Wing drastically increased its operations tempo during the early 2000s to guard America's skies and protect freedom. The 181st deployed members and equipment to 19 countries to simultaneously support seven different military operations, including: Operation Southern Watch, Operation Northern Watch, Operation Joint Forge, Operation Noble Eagle, Operation Deep Freeze, Operation Enduring Freedom and Operation Iraqi Freedom.

=== Air Support Operations ===
In 2005, the Base Realignment and Closure commission mandated the end of the flying era for the 181st. On 8 September 2007, the 181st Fighter Wing flew their last training mission out of Hulman Field International Airport. The Block 30 F-16 aircraft were reassigned to the 177th Fighter Wing, New Jersey Air National Guard at Atlantic City Air National Guard Base in September 2007.

A realignment was directed with two new Air Force missions: a Distributive Ground Station (DGS) and an Air Support Operations Squadron (ASOS). On 3 May 2008 the 181st Fighter Wing was redesignated as the 181st Intelligence Wing.

The DGS is an intelligence based mission, monitoring near real time video feed from Predators, Global Hawks and other unmanned aerial vehicles hovering the skies over any military area of operation. The servicemembers will process, exploit, and disseminate the video feed, providing actionable intelligence to the ground commanders and war-fighting forces.

The ASOS will bring unity to joint forces fighting in the global war on terrorism. Their mission is to advise the ground commanders on the best way to utilize U.S. and NATO assets for close air support.

=== Lineage ===
- Designated 181st Tactical Fighter Group and allotted to Indiana Air National Guard in 1962

Activated and extended federal recognition on 1 October 1962
Redesignated 181st Fighter Group, 16 March 1992
Redesignated 181st Fighter Wing, 1 October 1995
Redesignated 181st Intelligence Wing, 3 May 2008

=== Assignments ===
- Indiana Air National Guard, 1 October 1962 – Present

Gained by: Tactical Air Command
Gained by: Air Combat Command, 1 June 1992
Gained by: Air Force Intelligence, Surveillance and Reconnaissance Agency, 3 May 2008 – present

=== Components ===
- 181st Operations Group, 1 October 1995 – 3 May 2008
- 113th Tactical Fighter Squadron (Later 113th Fighter Squadron, 113th Air Support Operations Squadron), 1 October 1962 – Present

=== Stations ===
- Hulman Field, Terre Haute, Indiana, 1 September 1962

Designated: Terre Haute Air National Guard Base, 1991 – present

=== Aircraft ===
- RF-84F Thunderstreak, 1962–1964
- F-84F Thunderstreak, 1964–1971
- F-100D/F Super Sabre, 1971–1979
- F-4C Phantom II, 1979–1987
- F-4E Phantom II, 1987–1991
- Block 25 F-16C/D Fighting Falcon, 1991–1995
- Block 30 F-16C/D Fighting Falcon, 1995–2008

=== Decorations ===
- Air Force Outstanding Unit Award
