= Indiana Air National Guard =

Unit of the US Air National Guard for the State of Indiana

- Emblem of the Indiana Air National Guard
- Active: 1 August 1921 - present
- Country: United States
- Allegiance: Indiana
- Type: State militia, military reserve force
- Role: "To meet state and federal mission responsibilities."
- Part of: Indiana National Guard
- Garrison/HQ: Indiana Air National Guard, Stout Field, 2002 S. Holt Road, Indianapolis, IN 46241

Commanders
- Civilian leadership: President Donald Trump (Commander-in-Chief); Troy Meink (Secretary of the Air Force); Governor Mike Braun (Governor of the State of Indiana)
- State military leadership: Brigadier General R. Dale Lyles

Aircraft flown
- Fighter: F-16C/D Fighting Falcon

The Indiana Air National Guard (IN ANG) is the aerial militia of the state of Indiana, United States of America. It is a reserve of the United States Air Force and along with the Indiana Army National Guard, an element of the Indiana National Guard.

As state militia units, the units in the Indiana Air National Guard are not in the normal United States Air Force chain of command. They are under the jurisdiction of the governor of Indiana though the office of the Indiana Adjutant General unless they are federalized by order of the president of the United States. The Indiana Air National Guard is headquartered at Stout Field, Indianapolis, and its commander is Brigadier General R. Dale Lyles.

== Overview ==
Under the "Total Force" concept, Indiana Air National Guard units are considered to be Air Reserve Components (ARC) of the United States Air Force (USAF). Indiana ANG units are trained and equipped by the Air Force and are operationally gained by a major command of the USAF if federalized. In addition, the Indiana Air National Guard forces are assigned to Air Expeditionary Forces and are subject to deployment tasking orders along with their active duty and Air Force Reserve counterparts in their assigned cycle deployment window.

Along with their federal reserve obligations, as state militia units the elements of the Indiana ANG are subject to being activated by order of the governor to provide protection of life and property, and preserve peace, order and public safety. State missions include disaster relief in times of earthquakes, hurricanes, floods and forest fires, search and rescue, protection of vital public services, and support to civil defense.

== Components ==
The Indiana Air National Guard consists of the following major units:

- 122nd Fighter Wing

Established 10 November 1947 (as: 163rd Fighter Squadron); operates: F-16C/D Fighting Falcon
Stationed at: Fort Wayne Air National Guard Station, Fort Wayne
Gained by: Air Combat Command

- 181st Intelligence Wing

Established 1 August 1921 (as: 113th Observation Squadron); Non-Flying Wing
Stationed at: Terre Haute Air National Guard Base, Terre Haute
It is one of six Air National Guard wings that works with Sixteenth Air Force.

== History ==
The Militia Act of 1903 established the present National Guard system, units raised by the states but paid for by the Federal Government, liable for immediate state service. If federalized by presidential order, they fall under the regular military chain of command. On 1 June 1920, the Militia Bureau issued Circular No.1 on organization of National Guard air units.

The Indiana Air National Guard origins date to 1 August 1921 with the establishment of the 137th Squadron (Observation) in the Indiana NG, which had activated at Fagley Field, being equipped with Curtiss JN-4 Jennies. It was re-designated the 113th Observation Squadron on 25 January 1923, the unit relocated to Schoen Field and then Stout Field (formerly Mars Hill), Indianapolis in October 1926 and is oldest unit of the Indiana Air National Guard. It is one of the 29 original National Guard Observation Squadrons of the United States Army National Guard formed before World War II. The 113th Observation Squadron was ordered into active service on 1 September 1941 as part of the buildup of the Army Air Corps prior to the United States entry into World War II.

On 24 May 1946, the United States Army Air Forces, in response to dramatic postwar military budget cuts imposed by President Harry S. Truman, allocated inactive unit designations to the National Guard Bureau for the formation of an Air Force National Guard. These unit designations were allotted and transferred to various state National Guard bureaus to provide them unit designations to re-establish them as Air National Guard units.

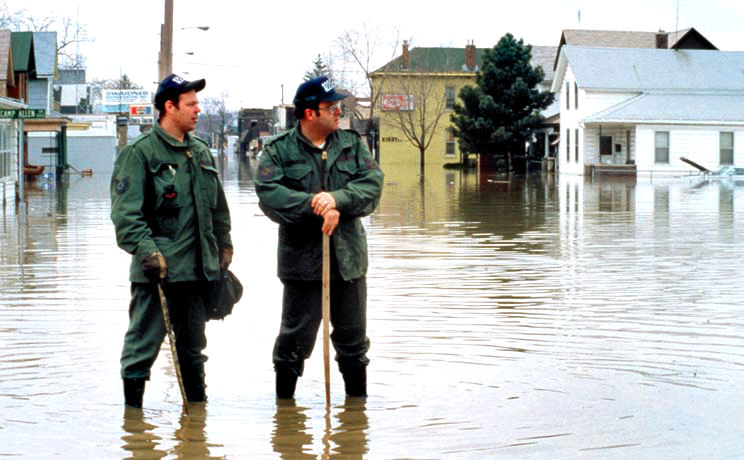
Members of the Indiana Air National Guard participate in an emergency operation after recent flooding in Fort Wayne, March 1, 1982

The modern Indiana ANG received federal recognition on 9 December 1946 as the 113th Fighter Squadron at Stout Field, Indianapolis. It was equipped with F-51D Mustangs and its mission was the air defense of the state. It was assigned to the 122d Fighter Group, also federally recognized on 9 December at Stout Field. 18 September 1947, however, is considered the Indiana Air National Guard's official birth concurrent with the establishment of the United States Air Force as a separate branch of the United States military under the National Security Act.

A second squadron, the 163rd Fighter Squadron, was federally recognized and activated on 10 November 1947 at Baer Field, Fort Wayne. It was assigned to the 122d Fighter Group and also was equipped with F-51D Mustangs.

Indiana Air Guard units were mobilized and served during the Korean War of the early 1950s and the Berlin Crisis of 1961. Personnel from four Army Guard and four Air Guard units from Indiana were called into federal service in support of the 1991 Gulf War in the Middle East.

With the advent of the Jet Age and the ANG converting from the World War II piston-powered F-51 to more modern aircraft, Stout Field was unable to safely operate with jets due to its short runways. After the unit was returned to Indiana state control, In 1954, aircraft operations at Stout Field were moved from Indianapolis to Baer Field, Fort Wayne, Headquarters of the Indiana ANG, however remained in Indianapolis, where it remains to this day.

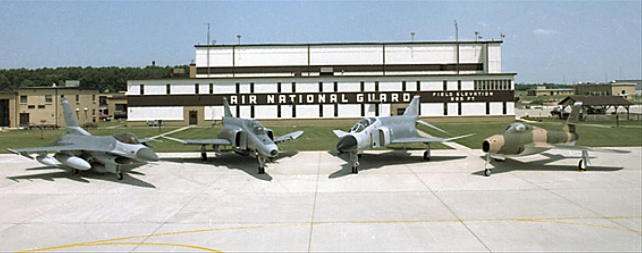
Historical aircraft assigned to the 113th Air Support Operations Squadron at Hulman Field. Shown is an F-16C (1991–2008), F-4C (1979–1987), F-4E (1987–1991) and an F-84F (1958–1971).

On 1 October 1962, the 113th Tactical Fighter Squadron was authorized to expand to a group level, and the 181st Tactical Fighter Group was established by the National Guard Bureau. The 113th TFS becoming the group's flying squadron.

After the September 11th, 2001, terrorist attacks on the United States, elements of every Air National Guard unit in Indiana has been activated in support of the global war on terrorism. Flight crews, aircraft maintenance personnel, communications technicians, air controllers and air security personnel were engaged in Operation Noble Eagle air defense overflights of major United States cities. Also, Indiana ANG units have been deployed overseas as part of Operation Enduring Freedom in Afghanistan and Operation Iraqi Freedom in Iraq as well as other locations as directed.

In 2005, the Base Realignment and Closure commission mandated the end of the flying era for the 181st Fighter Wing at Terre Haute. A realignment was directed with two new Air Force missions: a Distributive Ground Station (DGS) and an Air Support Operations Squadron (ASOS). On 8 September 2007, the 181st Fighter Wing flew their last training mission out of Hulman Field. On 3 May 2008, the 181st Fighter Wing was re-designated as the 181st Intelligence Wing.

== See also ==
- Indiana Guard Reserve
- Indiana Naval Militia
