= Terre Haute Regional Airport =

Terre Haute Regional Airport Hulman Field
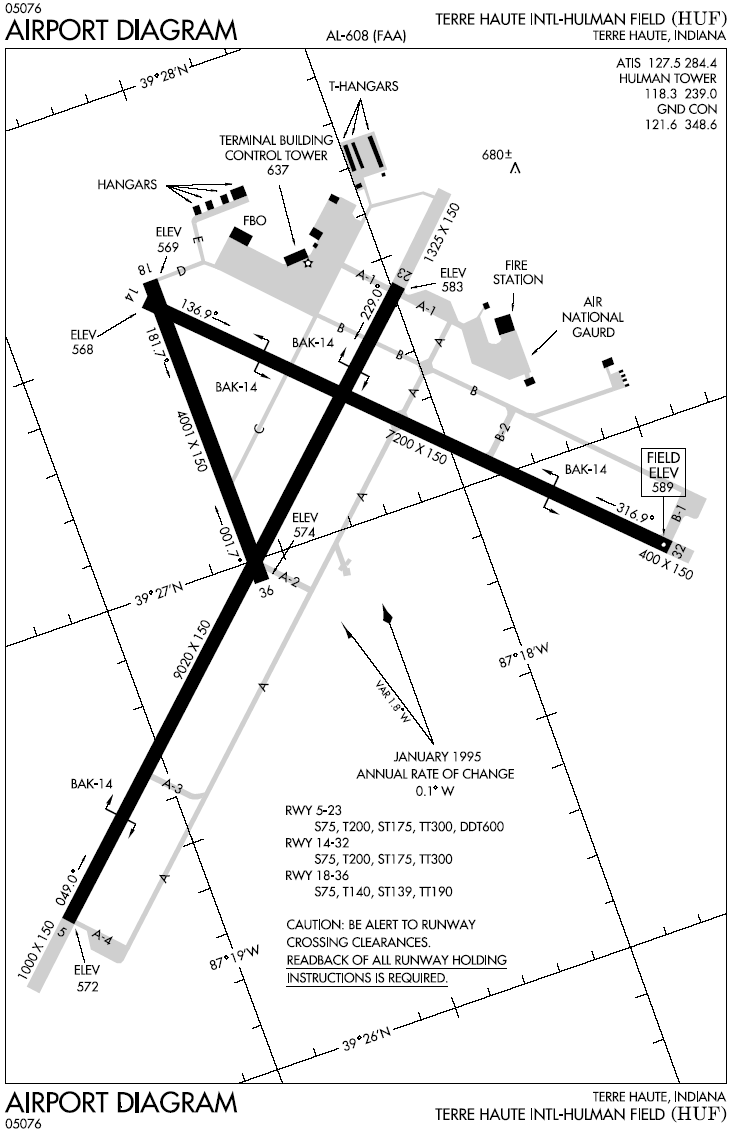
- FAA airport diagram
- IATA: HUF; ICAO: KHUF; FAA LID: HUF

Summary
- Airport type: Public
- Owner: Terre Haute Regional Airport Authority
- Serves: Terre Haute, Indiana
- Elevation AMSL: 589 ft (180 m)
- Coordinates: 39°27′05″N 87°18′27″W
- Website: Official website

Maps
- Location of Vigo County in Indiana

- Location of airport in Vigo County

Runways
Direction	Length		Surface
Direction	ft	m	Surface
5/23	9,021	2,750	Asphalt
14/32	7,200	2,195	Asphalt/concrete
- Source: Federal Aviation Administration

Terre Haute Regional Airport (IATA: HUF, ICAO: KHUF, FAA LID: HUF) is a civil-military public airport in Terre Haute, in Vigo County, Indiana, six miles (9.7 km) east of the city center. The FAA's National Plan of Integrated Airport Systems for 2011–2015 categorized it as a general aviation facility. It is also the location of Hulman Field Air National Guard Base of the Indiana Air National Guard.

== History ==
Originally called Hulman Field, the airport dates to 1943 when ground was broken on a 638-acre (2.58 km^{2}) site donated to the city of Terre Haute by businessman Anton "Tony" Hulman Jr. The airport was dedicated on October 3, 1944, and had three runways, taxiways, apron area, and a terminal building. Trans World Airlines (TWA) began the first commercial air service to the airport. In 1953, a new terminal and control tower were completed and the apron expanded. Since 1954, the 181st Intelligence Wing of the Indiana Air National Guard has been stationed at the airport.

In 1976, the city of Terre Haute and Vigo County jointly formed an authority to manage the airport. The Terre Haute Regional Airport Authority has six board members, with three appointed by the mayor of Terre Haute and three appointed by the Vigo County commissioners. The terminal was expanded in 1977 and 1981. In 1998 the name was changed from Hulman Regional Airport to Terre Haute International Airport – Hulman Field, primarily due to U.S. Postal Service contractor Evergreen Airlines using the airport as a hub, which has since closed.

Hulman Field formerly hosted the Terre Haute Air Fair. Performers included the USAF Thunderbirds, the Red Baron Pizza Squadron, and Michael Hunter, the world's only insulin-dependent aerobatics pilot. The Air Fair was run almost entirely by volunteers, including some from community organizations and school organizations looking for fundraising opportunities.

In 2016, the airport received a $3.5 million federal grant to fund repairs to a runway. The airport was the third busiest airport in the state of Indiana in 2016.

In 2017, work began on a $1.1 million project to upgrade the exterior of a terminal building at the airport. The National Defense Authorization Act for Fiscal Year 2018 included a $24 million federal grant for a military construction project at the airport that will support the operations of the Indiana National Guard's 181st Intelligence Wing.

In summer 2018, the United States Navy's flight exhibition team, the Blue Angels, performed at Terre Haute Regional Airport. The airshow attracted more than 55,000 people over the course of the weekend and was a major success for the airport.

The airport received a grant from Duke Energy to support development on the west side of the airport in 2020. Later that year, the airport was announced as one of five locations under consideration for an F-35 training center.

A public meeting was held in March 2021 to discuss a strategic plan for the airport.

== Historical airline service ==
Trans World Airlines (TWA) served Terre Haute from 1944 to 1967 as a stop between Indianapolis and St. Louis along its trancontinental route structure. TWA flew Douglas DC-3s followed by Martin 2-0-2 and Lockheed Constellation prop aircraft. Shortly before ending service in 1967, TWA had upgraded its flights to Douglas DC-9 jet aircraft.

Chicago and Southern Air Lines began service in the late 1940s with flights to Chicago and Evansville, Indiana. The carrier was merged into Delta Air Lines in 1953 and became known as Delta C&S. Service continued until 1954.

Lake Central Airlines served Terre Haute from 1954, replacing Delta-C&S, with flights to Chicago and Indianapolis, each making one-stop. Lake Central merged into Allegheny Airlines in 1968 and service continued until 1973.

Britt Airways, which had its headquarters at Terre Haute, took over for Allegheny in 1973 operating as Allegheny Commuter to Chicago and Indianapolis. In 1981, Britt began operating under its own identity and added new service to St. Louis. Britt was sold to People Express in 1985 and the flights to Chicago then began operating under a code-share relationship with People Express. Service to Indianapolis and St. Louis was discontinued. New service to Dayton was operated in 1985 and 1986 as Piedmont Commuter on behalf of Piedmont Airlines. In 1986 People Express was sold to Texas Air Corporation which also owned Continental Airlines and by 1987, the flights to Chicago began operating as Continental Express. Britt's scheduled service to Terre Haute ended in 1989 but the company continued operating its headquarters at the airport until 1996 while it became the primary regional feeder carrier for Continental Airlines.

Trans World Express, operated by Resort Air on behalf of TWA, flew to St. Louis for a brief time during the summer of 1987.

Allegheny Commuter, operated by Air Kentucky on behalf of USAir, served Terre Haute from Indianapolis in 1987 and 1988.

American Eagle, operating on behalf of American Airlines, briefly served Terre Haute in 1986 with flights to Nashville. American Eagle returned in 1989 taking over the service to Chicago which continued into 1993.

Lone Star Airlines served the airport from 1991 through 1994 with flights to St. Louis.

Midway Connection, operated by Direct Air then provided service to Chicago's Midway International Airport during 1994 and 1995.

United Express, operated by Great Lakes Aviation on behalf of United Airlines was the final carrier to serve Terre Haute with flights back to Chicago's O'Hare International Airport from 1995 until July 10, 1999. The airport then went without scheduled airline service.

Branson Air Express announced service in February 2010, but the airline later cancelled those plans, citing weak demand. There is currently no scheduled commercial service at Terre Haute Regional Airport.

== Air National Guard ==
The airport is home to the 181st Intelligence Wing (181 IW) of the Indiana Air National Guard. The ANG enclave is called Hulman Field Air National Guard Base. The 181 IW is operationally gained by the 16th Air Force (16 AF).

The unit served in World War II, flying anti-submarine patrol along the East Coast of the United States and the Gulf of Mexico. It was also activated for the Korean War and the Berlin Crisis of 1961. In 1962 it was established as a fighter unit, the 181st Tactical Fighter Group (181 TFG), operationally-gained by the Tactical Air Command (TAC). Initially using the RF-84F Thunderstreak, the unit transitioned to the F-84F Thunderstreak in 1964, the F-100D/F Super Sabre in 1971, the F-4 Phantom II in 1979, and the F-16 Fighting Falcon in 1991. Known as the Racers, the then-181 TFG participated in the first Gulf War from 1990 to 1991. With the disestablishment of TAC in 1992, the unit was redesignated the 181st Fighter Group (181 FG) and operationally-gained by the Air Combat Command (ACC). In 1995, it was redesignated as the 181st Fighter Wing (181 FW) and deployed to Kuwait on two separate occasions in support of Operation Southern Watch.

On September 11, 2001, the 181 FW flew combat air patrols over the Midwestern United States less than four hours after the attacks on New York City and Washington, DC. The wing drastically increased its operations tempo, deployed members and equipment to 19 countries, and simultaneously supported seven different military operations, including Operation Southern Watch, Operation Northern Watch, Operation Joint Forge, Operation Noble Eagle, Operation Deep Freeze, Operation Enduring Freedom, and Operation Iraqi Freedom.

In 2005, concurrent with an Air Force initiative to phase out F-16C/D aircraft Block 30 and older, the Base Realignment and Closure Commission (BRAC) mandated the end of flying operations for the 181 FW. On September 8, 2007, the wing's F-16C Block 30s flew their last training mission out of Terre Haute Regional Airport/Hulman Field Air National Guard Base. The wing's squadrons were redesignated as a Distributive Ground Station (DGS) and an Air Support Operations Squadron (ASOS) and on May 3, 2008, the 181st Fighter Wing was re-designated as the 181st Intelligence Wing (181 IW).

== Facilities ==
The airport covers 1,475 acres (597 ha) and has two runways:

- Runway 5/23: 9,021 ft × 150 ft (2,750 m × 46 m), surface: asphalt
- Runway 14/32: 7,200 ft × 150 ft (2,195 m × 46 m), surface: asphalt/concrete

Indiana State University uses Hulman Field for its aviation program. The USAF uses Hulman Field for worldwide command and control of remote control surveillance aircraft. Hulman Field can also support the F-16 and larger military aircraft on an "as needed" basis.

== Accidents ==
- On January 30, 1984, a Swearingen Merlin operated by Britt Airways entered a steep descent after takeoff from HUF and crashed 6,300 feet (1,900 m) past the runway end and 1,800 feet (550 m) left of the extended centerline. All three occupants, employees of Britt Airways, were killed.
- On May 15, 2025, a General Motors TBM-3 Avenger crashed on landing at the airport.

== See also ==
- List of airports in Indiana
