= Operation Northern Watch =

1997 no-fly zone operation in Iraq

- Part of the Iraqi no-fly zones conflict
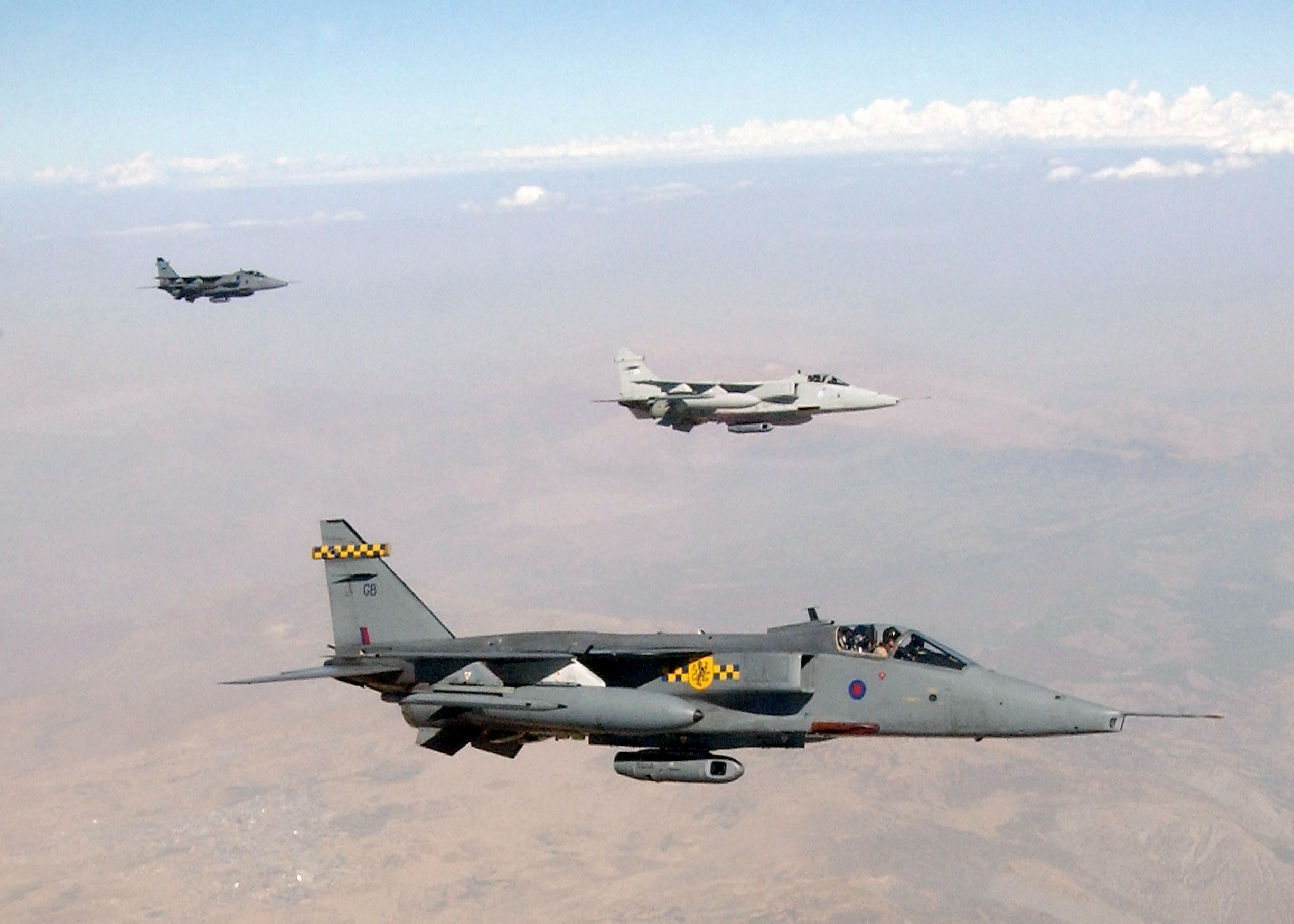
- Three British RAF Jaguars on a Northern Watch mission in September 2002
- Type: No-fly zones
- Location: Northern Iraq
- Date: 1 January 1997 – 1 May 2003
- Executed by: United States Armed Forces; Royal Air Force; Turkish Air Force
- Outcome: Operational success Successful maintenance of an autonomous Kurdish region in northern Iraq; No-fly Zones ended after 2003 invasion of Iraq

Operation Northern Watch (ONW), the successor to Operation Provide Comfort, was a Combined Task Force (CTF) charged with enforcing its own no-fly zone above the 36th parallel in Iraq. Its mission began on 1 January 1997.

The coalition partners of the United States, United Kingdom, and Turkey provided approximately 45 aircraft and more than 1,400 personnel to support Operation Northern Watch. The joint U.S. forces of some 1,100 U.S. personnel, included airmen, sailors, soldiers, and Marines, as well as aircraft from every arm of the United States Armed Forces.

The original mandate from the Turkish government allowed the operation to continue for six months. Turkey subsequently approved two 6-month extensions, but indicated that it would not become a permanent mission.

For the first year of the mission, northern Iraq was quiet, with no combat between Coalition aircraft and Iraqi forces.

Operation Northern Watch forces did not take part in Operation Desert Fox in December 1998. After Desert Fox, Iraq announced they would no longer recognize the no-fly zones and urged their troops to attack Coalition aircraft. On 28 December 1998 Iraq fired SA-3 surface to air missiles against coalition aircraft patrolling the northern no-fly zone. In response, U.S. Air Force (USAF) F-15Es, F-16CJs, and U.S. Marine Corps (USMC) EA-6Bs launched anti-radiation missiles and dropped precision guided munitions (PGMs) on the SA-3 ground-based missile site that fired on the ONW aircraft, and destroyed it. From December 1998 to March 1999, U.S. aircraft over northern Iraq came under almost daily fire from Iraqi surface-to-air missile sites and anti-aircraft guns. U.S. aircraft responded by bombing Iraqi air-defense sites, using laser-guided bombs as well as AGM-88 HARM missiles and AGM-130 long range air-to-surface missiles. The first combat use of the AGM-130 was conducted during ONW, when F-15Es deployed a pair to destroy two Iraqi SAM sites.

Coalition aircraft flew patrols on an average of 18 days per month, and were usually fired upon. The most common threat was from anti-aircraft guns. Despite Saddam Hussein offering a $14,000 reward for downing a Coalition aircraft, no warplanes were shot down.

Low level conflict continued up until the invasion of Iraq in 2003, although the number of response incidents declined dramatically after 1999. The final combat air patrol occurred on 17 March 2003 (from the Incirlik Air Base) by the 181st FW Indiana Air National Guard and the 55th FW Shaw AFB SC. Six weeks later the operation concluded with an official stand down on 1 May 2003.

A grand total of 36,000 sorties were flown during Operation Northern Watch, and 40,000 personnel had been deployed at some point during the operation. Operation Northern Watch was the longest combat operation in the history of the European Command.

== See also ==
- Operation Southern Watch
