= USS Kitkun Bay =

Casablanca-class escort carrier of the US Navy

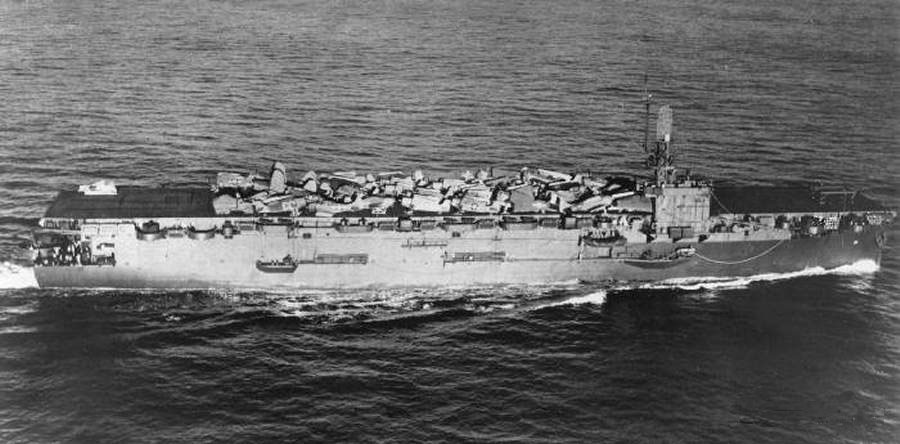
- USS Kitkun Bay underway, 10 February 1944

History

United States
- Name: Kitkun Bay
- Namesake: Kitkun Bay, Prince of Wales Island
- Ordered: as a Type S4-S2-BB3 hull, MCE Hull 1108
- Awarded: 18 June 1942
- Builder: Kaiser Shipyards
- Laid down: 3 May 1943
- Launched: 8 November 1943
- Commissioned: 15 December 1943
- Decommissioned: 19 April 1946
- Stricken: 1 April 1960
- Identification: Hull symbol: CVE-71
- Honors and awards: 6 Battle stars, a Presidential Unit Citation for conduct during the Battle off Samar
- Fate: Sold for scrap, 18 November 1946

General characteristics
- Class & type: Casablanca-class escort carrier
- Displacement: 8,188 long tons (8,319 t) (standard); 10,902 long tons (11,077 t) (full load)
- Length: 512 ft 3 in (156.13 m) (oa); 490 ft (150 m) (wl); 474 ft (144 m) (fd)
- Beam: 65 ft 2 in (19.86 m); 108 ft (33 m) (extreme width)
- Draft: 20 ft 9 in (6.32 m) (max)
- Installed power: 4 × Babcock & Wilcox boilers; 9,000 shp (6,700 kW)
- Propulsion: 2 × Skinner Unaflow reciprocating steam engines; 2 × screws
- Speed: 19 knots (35 km/h; 22 mph)
- Range: 10,240 nmi (18,960 km; 11,780 mi) at 15 kn (28 km/h; 17 mph)
- Complement: Total: 910 – 916 officers and men; Embarked squadron: 50 – 56; Ship's crew: 860
- Armament: As designed: 1 × 5 in (127 mm)/38 cal dual-purpose gun; 4 × twin 40 mm (1.57 in) Bofors anti-aircraft guns; 12 × 20 mm (0.79 in) Oerlikon anti-aircraft cannons; Varied, ultimate armament: 1 × 5 in (127 mm)/38 cal dual-purpose gun; 8 × twin 40 mm (1.57 in) Bofors anti-aircraft guns; 20 × 20 mm (0.79 in) Oerlikon anti-aircraft cannons
- Aircraft carried: 27
- Aviation facilities: 1 × catapult; 2 × elevators

Service record
- Part of: United States Pacific Fleet (1944–1946)
- Operations: Mariana and Palau Islands campaign; Battle of the Philippine Sea; Philippines campaign; Battle off Samar; Invasion of Lingayen Gulf; Operation Magic Carpet

USS Kitkun Bay (CVE-71) was the 17th of 50 Casablanca-class escort carriers built for the United States Navy during World War II. She was launched in November 1943 and transferred to the Navy and commissioned in December. She served in the Mariana and Palau Islands campaign, the Battle off Samar, in which she faced the first wave of organized kamikaze attacks, (Note: George Hermon Gill claims that HMAS Canberra was the first Allied ship to be hit by a kamikaze, but this is disputed by Samuel Eliot Morison, who asserts that Canberra was a target of opportunity, and that the kamikaze planes of the Battle off Samar represented the first organized attack.) and the Invasion of Lingayen Gulf, during which she was damaged by another kamikaze and forced to withdraw. After the war, she participated in Operation Magic Carpet, repatriating U.S. servicemen from around the Pacific. She was decommissioned in April 1946 and sold for scrapping in November. Ultimately, she was broken up in early 1947.

== Design and description ==
A side profile of the design of Thetis Bay

Kitkun Bay was a Casablanca-class escort carrier, the most numerous type of aircraft carriers ever built. Built to stem heavy losses during the Battle of the Atlantic, they came into service in late 1943, by which time the U-boat threat was already in retreat. Although some did see service in the Atlantic, most were used in the Pacific, ferrying aircraft, providing logistics support, and conducting close air support for the island-hopping campaigns. The Casablanca-class carriers were built on the standardized Type S4-S2-BB3 hull, a lengthened variant of the Doyen-class hull, and specifically designed to be mass-produced using welded, prefabricated sections. This allowed them to be produced at unprecedented speeds; the final ship of her class, Munda, was delivered to the Navy just 101 days after the laying of her keel.

Kitkun Bay was 512 ft 3 in (156.13 m) long overall (490 ft (150 m) at the waterline), had a beam of 65 ft 2 in (19.86 m), and a draft of 20 ft 9 in (6.32 m). She displaced 8,188 long tons (8,319 t) standard, which increased to 10,902 long tons (11,077 t) with a full load. To carry out flight operations, the ship had a 257 ft (78 m) hangar deck and a 474 ft (144 m) flight deck. Her compact size necessitated the installation of an aircraft catapult at her bow, with two aircraft elevators to facilitate movement of aircraft between the flight and hangar deck, one each fore and aft.

She was powered by four Babcock & Wilcox Express D boilers that raised 285 psi (1,970 kPa) of steam at 577 °F (303 °C). The steam generated by these boilers fed two Skinner Unaflow reciprocating steam engines, delivering 9,000 hp (6,700 kW) to two propeller shafts. This allowed her to reach speeds of 19 kn (35 km/h; 22 mph), with a cruising range of 10,240 nmi (18,960 km; 11,780 mi) at 15 kn (28 km/h; 17 mph). For armament, one 5 in (127 mm)/38-caliber dual-purpose gun was mounted on the stern. Additional antiaircraft (AAC) defense was provided by eight Bofors 40 mm (1.57 in) AAC guns in single mounts and 12 Oerlikon 20 mm (0.79 in) cannons mounted around the perimeter of the deck. By 1945, Casablanca-class carriers had been modified to carry 20 Oerlikon cannons and 16 Bofors guns; the doubling of the latter was accomplished by putting them into twin mounts. Sensors onboard consisted of a SG surface-search radar and an SK air-search radar.

Although Casablanca-class escort carriers were intended to function with a crew of 860 and an embarked squadron of 50 to 56, the exigencies of wartime often necessitated the inflation of the crew count. They were designed to operate with 27 aircraft, but the hangar deck could accommodate many more during transport or training missions.

During the Mariana and Palau Islands campaign, she carried 12 FM-2 fighters, and eight TBM-1C torpedo bombers. During the Philippines campaign an Battle off Samar, though, she carried 16 FM-2 fighters and 12 TBM-1C torpedo bombers. During the Invasion of Lingayen Gulf, she carried 15 FM-2 fighters and 10 TBM-3 torpedo bombers, along with two reconnaissance planes, an FM-2P, and a TBM-3P.

== Construction ==
Her construction was awarded to Kaiser Shipbuilding Company, Vancouver, Washington, under a Maritime Commission contract, MC Hull 1108, on 18 June 1942. She was laid down on 3 May 1943 under the name Kitkun Bay, under Frank Knox's directive naming escort carriers for "sounds, bays, and islands". Her namesake, Kitkun Bay, is located on the southeastern end of Prince of Wales Island, constituting part of the Alexander Archipelago, at the time within the Territory of Alaska. She was laid down as the 17th of a series of 50 Casablanca-class escort carriers. She was launched on 8 November 1943, sponsored by Mrs. Francis E. Cruise; she was transferred to the Navy and commissioned at Astoria, Oregon, on 15 December 1943, with Captain John Perry Whitney in command.

== Service history ==
Upon being commissioned, Kitkun Bay spent the rest of December and early January undergoing fitting out at U.S. Naval Ship Yard Tongue Point, Astoria, Oregon. She then underwent a shakedown cruise down the West Coast, heading to Naval Air Station North Island, San Diego, California. She arrived at San Diego on 22 January 1944, and after spending a week conducting exercises off the Channel Islands, she loaded Marine Torpedo Bomber Squadron (VMTB) 242 on a transport mission bound for the New Hebrides.

Kitkun Bay arrived at Espiritu Santo on 14 February, where she took on a load of cargo, ferrying it to Efate, arriving on 18 February. On her return trip, she stopped at Pearl Harbor on 28 February, arriving back at part in San Diego on 6 March. From 9 to 17 March, she conducted pilot qualifications with her intended air contingent, Composite Squadron (VC) 5, until she returned to port, during which VC-5 was detached for further training. For the rest of March, she performed pilot qualifications for a variety of different squadrons. During April, she was moored at Naval Base San Diego, where maintenance and repairs were conducted. During this period, Rear Admiral Harold Bushnell Salada, commander of Carrier Division 26, designated Kitkun Bay as his flagship. On 1 May, she left port with VC-5 attached. Joined by her sisters Gambier Bay and Nehenta Bay, she arrived at Ford Island on 8 May, where the carriers conducted training with other warships throughout the rest of May.

=== Mariana and Palau Islands campaign ===
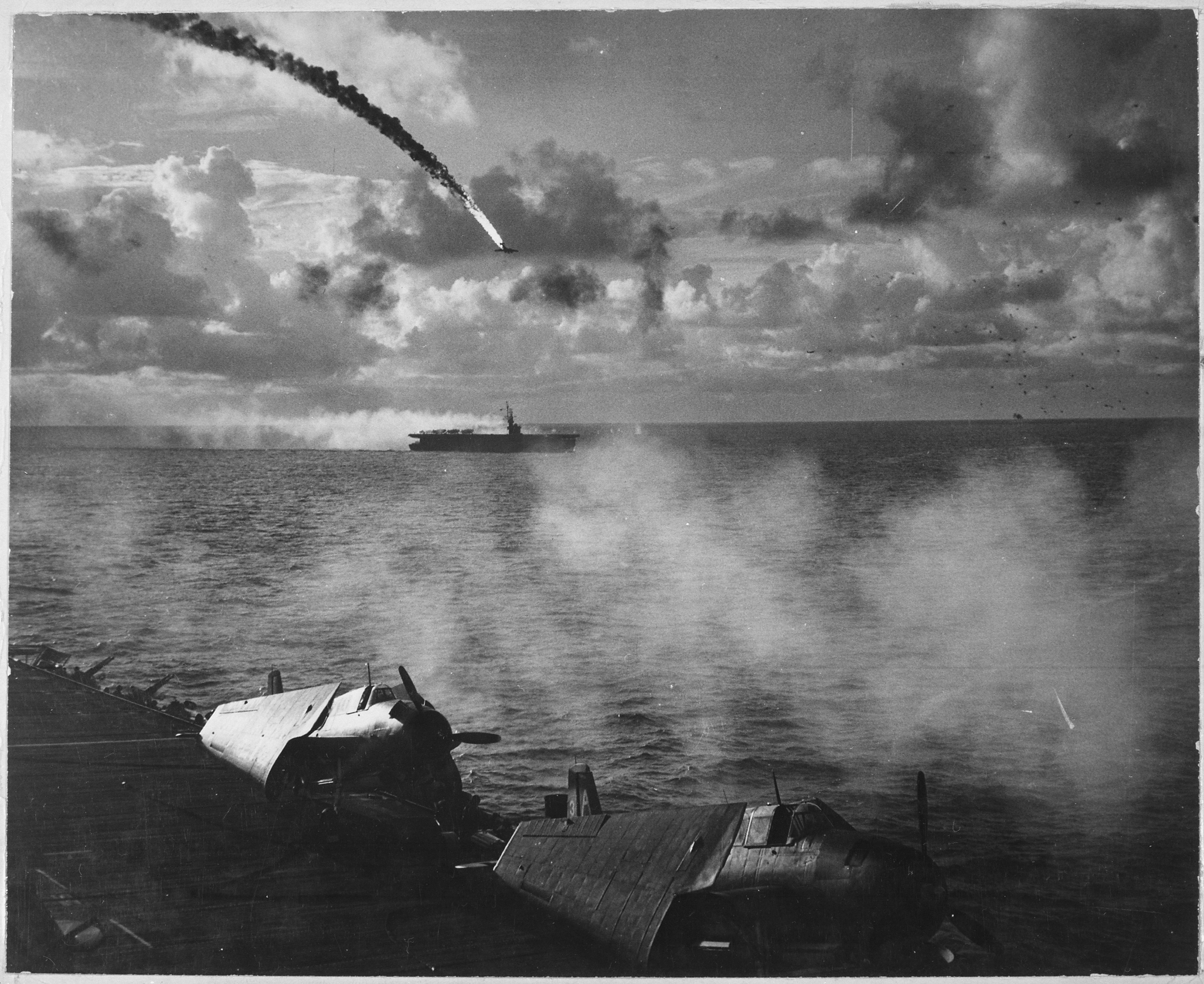
A Japanese plane is shot down as it attempts to attack Kitkun Bay, June 1944.

On 31 May, Kitkun Bay sallied forth as part of an armada escorting Transport Division 16 towards Saipan of the Mariana Islands for the planned landings there. Kitkun Bay, along with the other carriers, launched fighter and antisubmarine patrols. On 8 June, she arrived at Kwajalein Atoll. There, she was assigned to serve as the flagship of Task Unit 52.11.1. On 13 June, her fighters notched their first kill, shooting down a Mitsubishi G4M1-variant bomber at 11:05. She arrived off Saipan on 14 June, and her aircraft contingent commenced close air support on the following day.

On the afternoon of 18 June, a large formation of Japanese aircraft, estimated at 30 to 50 planes, was detected approaching from the south. At 17:55, six planes broke through the air screen, and approached the escort carriers. One of these planes, identified as a Nakajima J1N, made a run on Kitkun Bay from her starboard bow. The aircraft was engaged by AAC fire, but still managed to release its torpedo within 100 yd (91 m) of the carrier, but due to her hard turn, the torpedo missed Kitkun Bay by about 25 ft (7.6 m). As the plane attempted to pull out, it was further damaged, before nose-diving into the ocean. A second plane also tried to engage the carrier, but it was quickly shot down, splashing down about 300 yd (270 m) off her port quarter. The next day, on 19 June, Kitkun Bay's aircraft participated in the Battle of the Philippine Sea, providing a screen and intercepting Japanese planes.

From 5 to 10 July, Kitkun Bay replenished at Eniwetok of the Marshall Islands. On 23 July, the escort carriers turned their attention towards Tinian, with Kitkun Bay sending 16 FM-2 Wildcats and 11 TBM-1C Avengers to strike targets around the island. On 1 August, the escort carriers transitioned towards supporting the landings on Guam. As the marines secured the island, the escort carriers retired for Eniwetok, arriving on 7 August. On 8 August, Rear Admiral Ralph A. Ofstie took over command of Carrier Division 26, and broke his flag on Kitkun Bay. On 8 September, she escorted the landing craft participating in the landings on Peleliu and Angaur of the Palau Islands, providing close air support as they landed on 15 September. On 21 September, the escort carriers withdrew to Ulithi of the Caroline Islands. They then proceeded to Seeadler Harbor on Manus Island of the Admiralty Islands, where they prepared for the planned Philippines campaign. Kitkun Bay left Seeadler Harbor on 12 October as part of an advance contingent, escorting Rear Admiral William Fechteler's Task Group 28.2. She arrived off of Mindanao on 19 October, and commenced operations in support of the landings on Leyte starting on 20 October.

=== Philippines campaign ===
==== Battle off Samar ====
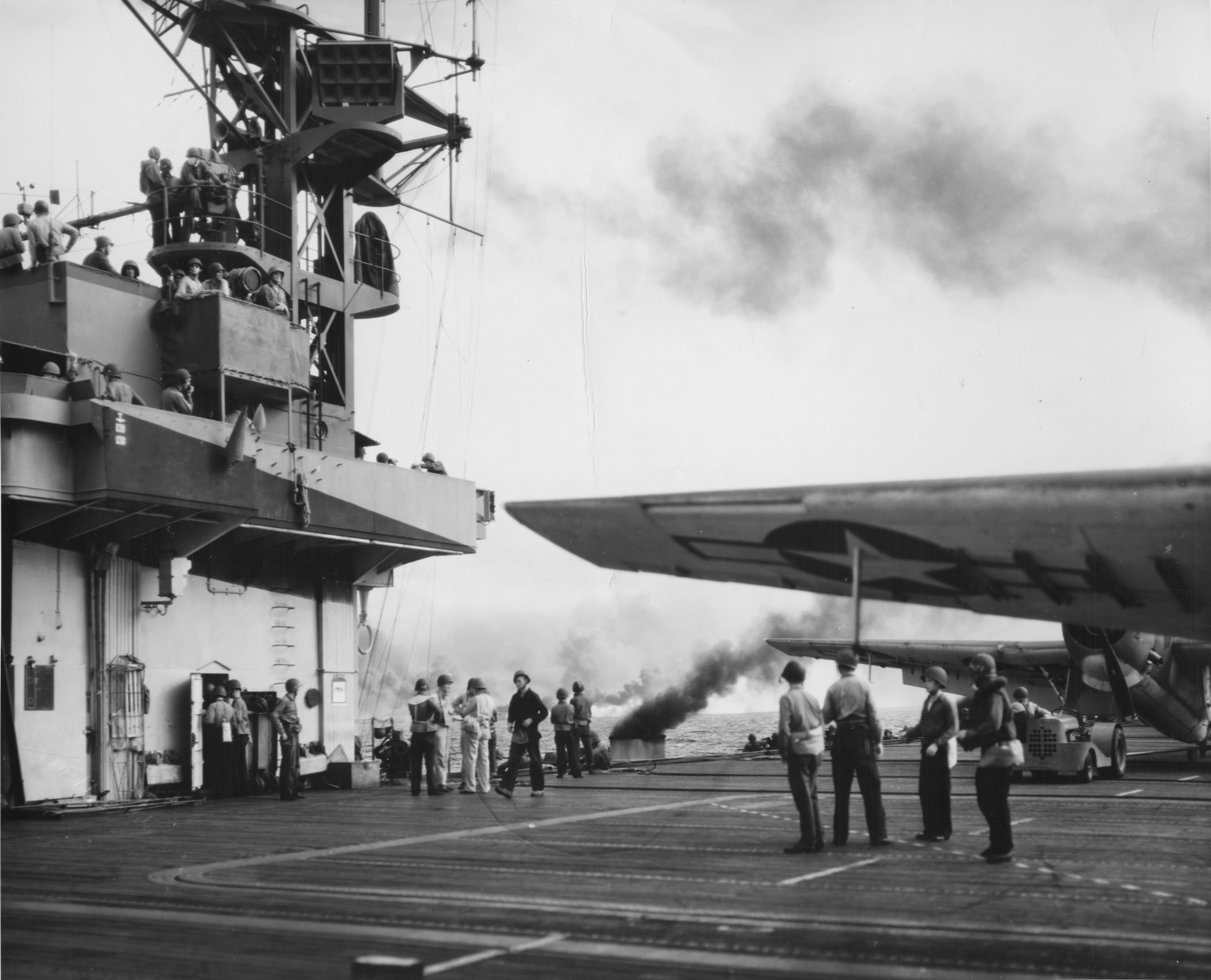
A view of the flight deck of Kitkun Bay, circa 1944

At the time of the invasion, Taffy 3, under the command of Rear Admiral Clifton Sprague, consisted of Fanshaw Bay, St. Lo, White Plains, Kalinin Bay, Kitkun Bay, and Gambier Bay, along with an accompanying screen of three destroyers and four destroyer escorts. Rear Admiral Ofstie had responsibility over Kiktun Bay and Gambier Bay, but Sprague had authority over the unit as a whole. As the U.S. fleet gathered off the Philippines, the Japanese garrison on Suluan managed to alert their command. This prompted Admiral Soemu Toyoda to launch Shō-Gō 1, a gambit to defend Japan's access to the oil fields of Southeast Asia. On 18 and 19 October, Taffy 3 conducted strikes against Japanese bases located within Cebu, Negros, and Panay, destroying 38 planes and damaging 28 more. She then steamed off the island of Samar from 20 to 25 October, providing air support for U.S. forces onshore, and dropping leaflets on Japanese positions. In the meantime, Admiral William Halsey Jr. led his Third Fleet northwards, after spotting Vice Admiral Jisaburō Ozawa's diversionary Northern Force. Thus, the only ships covering the vulnerable landing craft of Leyte Gulf were the three escort carrier task groups and their screens. Taffy 3, the northmost task group, bore the brunt of Vice Admiral Takeo Kurita's Center Force as it swung through the San Bernardino Strait.

On the early morning of 25 October, Kurita's Center Force had already crossed the San Bernardino Strait unmolested and was entering the open waters of Leyte Gulf. White Plains's radar had possibly spotted the Japanese force maneuvering into position at 03:00, but this information was disregarded by the ship's command. Although World War II-era surface radar was notoriously faulty, the speed and course of the spotted blip was consistent with the course set by the Center Force.

At 04:30, the escort carriers went to general quarters in preparation for another round of airstrikes and close air support. The first indication of Japanese contact happened shortly after 06:30, when Taffy 3 experienced three almost simultaneous warnings. Firstly, they began receiving unencrypted Japanese chatter. Secondly, they spotted AAC fire, estimated at 20 mi (32 km) to the north, where no Allied surface presence was known. In fact, a TBM Avenger from St. Lo had stumbled into the midst of the Japanese fleet and began radioing Rear Admiral Sprague warnings. Thirdly, Fanshaw Bay's radar operators spotted an unmistakable surface signature of unknown surface ships just 18.5 mi (29.8 km) away. As such, the opening stages of the Battle off Samar caught Sprague and the escort carriers completely by surprise.

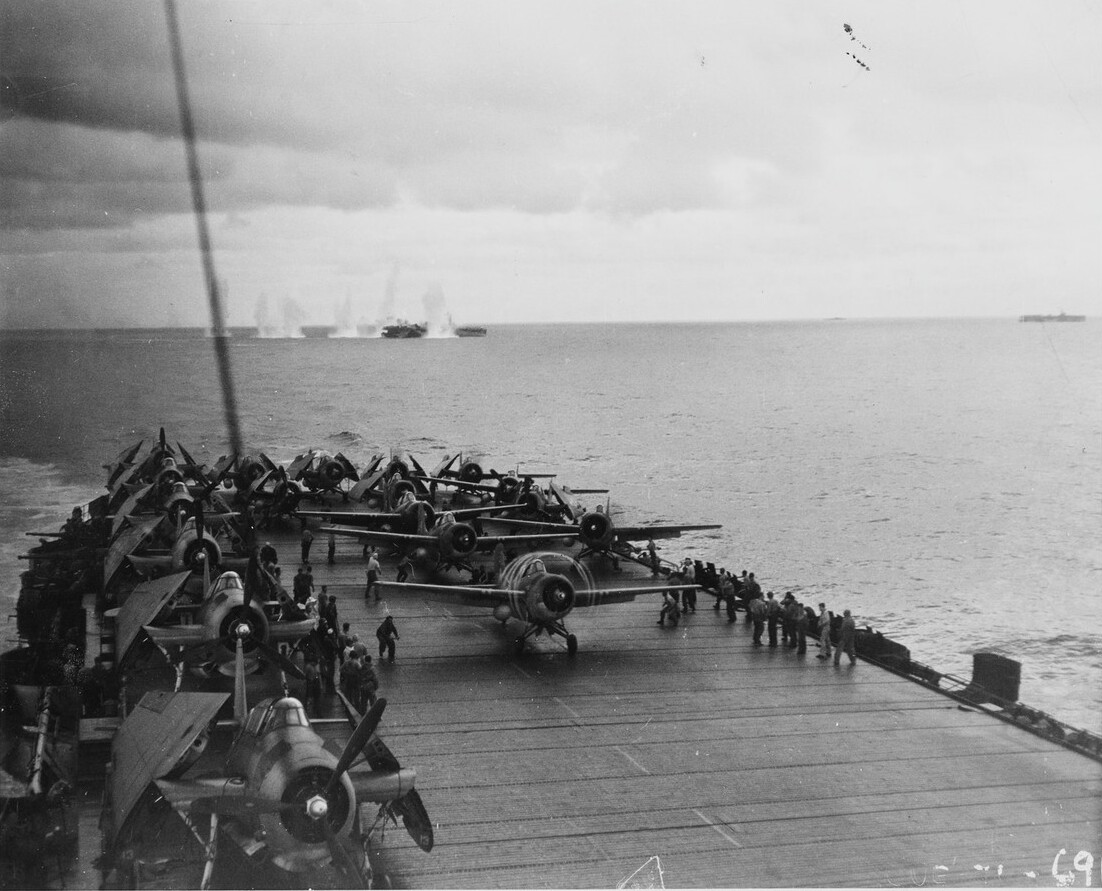
Kitkun Bay is preparing to launch FM-2 Wildcat fighters during the opening maneuvers of the Battle off Samar. In the background, White Plains is coming under heavy fire.

Upon coming to an understanding of the severity of the situation, Sprague ordered Taffy 3 to steam eastward, in hopes of being shielded by a passing rain squall. Kitkun Bay swung to 70°, into the wind, to aid in launching planes. At 06:55, Kitkun Bay went to flight quarters, "on the double", launching a set of eight FM-2 Wildcats from 06:56 to 07:03. At 07:10, Kitkun Bay sent out six TBM-1C Avengers, each armed with four 500 lb (230 kg) semiarmor piercing bombs. At 07:11, another FM-2 Wildcat was dispatched. Sprague also radioed for assistance from Vice Admiral Jesse B. Oldendorf, the commander of Task Group 77.2, which had just defeated the Southern Force in the Battle of Surigao Strait. Unfortunately for Sprague, Oldendorf was at least three hours' sail away, Task Group 77.2 was scattered over an immense distance because of the previous night's battle, and it was low on both fuel and ammunition. Taffy 3 would have to confront the Center Force by itself.

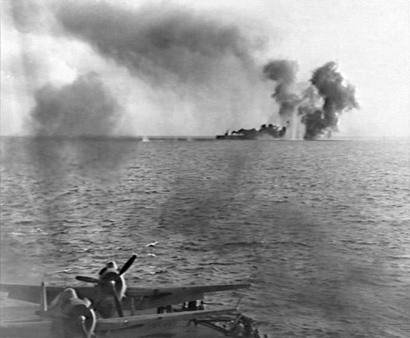
White Plains photographed being straddled by shellfire from the flight deck of Kitkun Bay

Although Kitkun Bay was located towards the west of the formation, it was shielded by Fanshaw Bay and White Plains, which bore the brunt of the opening salvoes from the Japanese fleet, which at the time was about 16.6 mi (26.7 km) away. The Japanese were firing dye-marked shells to gauge their aim, and Fanshaw Bay and White Plains were quickly bracketed between plumes of color, much to the concern of their command on board. The officers would certainly be more concerned if they were able to correspond the color of the dyed water to that of a particular Japanese ship, as the pink dyes corresponded to the Japanese battleship Yamato, with its 18 in (460 mm) guns, the largest ever manufactured, and the yellow dyes corresponded to the Japanese battleship Kongo, with its 14 in (360 mm) guns.

As the Japanese fleet approached, Kitkun Bay began to jettison some of her armaments at hand, while continuing to frantically emit smoke. At 07:35, Sprague ordered the escort carriers to begin engaging with their 5-inch guns, and by the end of the battle, Kitkun Bay had expended 120 of the 180 rounds available. At 07:59, one of her shells impacted what was possibly a cruiser, starting a fire in the fore. At 08:03, Kitkun Bay launched a further three FM-2 Wildcats, to join the eight launched earlier. To avoid the Japanese cruisers Chikuma and Tone, the escort carriers set a southwesterly course, which brought Gambier Bay and Kitkun Bay in the crosshairs of the Japanese force. In the meantime, the pilots of Kitkun Bay's air contingent, VC-5, had been distinguishing themselves in their fight against the Japanese fleet. At 08:44, Richard L. Fowler, VC-5's commander, assembled a group of eight FM-2 Wildcats and 16 TBM Avengers, and under his command, at 08:53, an Avenger from Manila Bay succeeded in landing a torpedo hit on Chikuma, disabling her handling, and taking her out of the battle.

After Gambier Bay had been thoroughly damaged by shells, setting the ship ablaze, the Japanese turned their attention towards Kitkun Bay, as she peeked out of the smoke. The Japanese gunnery gradually adjusted its aim, and starting from the first salvo at 08:28, crept up to within 500 yd (460 m). Despite the desperate use of smoke screens, and the heroic defense of her escorts, by 08:55, the Japanese had already closed the distance to only 6.25 mi (10.06 km). At 08:59, the cruiser Chōkai, which already had her stern blown off by a torpedo from the destroyer escort Samuel B. Roberts, suffered a secondary explosion, possibly derived from the cooking off of munitions on board, crippling her handling and forcing her out of the vanguard formation. At 09:05, Fowler guided two Avengers towards Chōkai, where they released their payloads, with Fowler reporting nine 500 lb (230 kg) bomb hits, five amidships, three near the bow, and one near the stern, fatally damaging the heavy cruiser. At 09:40, Chōkai was scuttled by torpedoes from the destroyer Fujinami. Undaunted, Tone had closed the distance to within 12,000 yd (11,000 m) of Kitkun Bay, with its salvo straddling the fleeing carrier on both sides. As a parting shot, a volley passed Kitkun Bay's side by only 20 yd (18 m). However, at this point, Admiral Kurita, discouraged by the resistance he was facing and uncertain about the intelligence provided to him, convinced himself to withdraw. At 09:25, to the bewilderment of Rear Admiral Sprague, the Japanese fleet turned around and retired. Remarkably, Kitkun Bay, despite several near misses, suffered no significant damage during the engagement, and only a few casualties from flying fragments.

Taffy 3 continued harassing the Japanese as they withdrew from the Battle off Samar. At 10:15, six TBM-1C Avengers were launched from Kitkun Bay, five of them outfitted with torpedoes, joining four more TBM Avengers to attack the retreating Japanese fleet. Proceeding north, one of the TBM Avengers was forced to break off due to mechanical issues. The remaining strike force sighted Chikuma, and in the ensuing action, scored two torpedo hits on the Chikuma's portside, severely damaging her. Shortly afterwards, Chikuma was finished off by aircraft from Ommaney Bay and Natoma Bay.

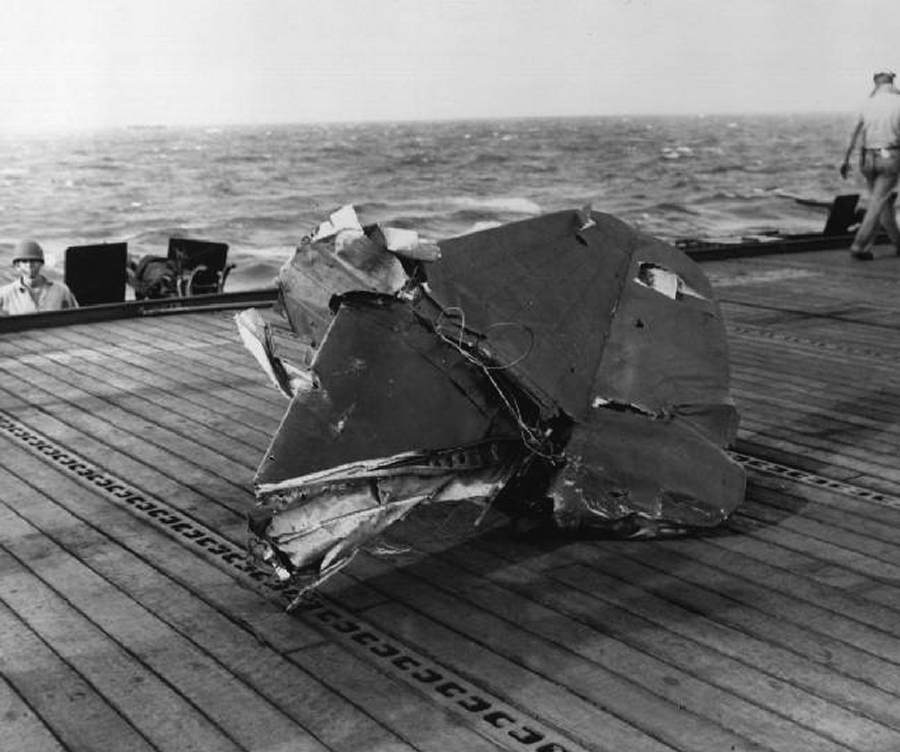
As the kamikaze passed over the island of Kitkun Bay and exploded, it showered fragments of itself across the flight deck, including this section of its tail.

At 10:51, five kamikaze Zeroes were spotted approaching Taffy 3 from the northwest. These planes were part of Yukio Seki's Shikishima squadron, which was conducting the first official kamikaze attacks of the war. The carriers and their escorts were caught out of position, and by the time concentrated AAC fire could be brought to bear, the kamikaze planes were nearly on top of the formation. The first kamikaze to strike set its sights on Kitkun Bay, diving from her port side. As it approached the carrier, the kamikaze changed the angle of its dive, aiming directly for Kitkun Bay's island, but at the last second, perhaps due to the incapacitation of the pilot, it streaked just over the island. It careened into the port walkway netting, tore through the port catwalk, bringing 15 ft (4.6 m) of it along, which detonated its 550 lb (250 kg) bomb on board, before plunging into the ocean some 25 yd (23 m) from her port side. The bomb showered fragments throughout the flight deck, puncturing more than 100 holes, and breached the gasoline lines, forming a puddle within a gun sponson, which was washed overboard. One crewman onboard was killed, four were seriously wounded, 12 were slightly wounded, and two TBM-1C Avengers were rendered inoperable from the attack. Elsewhere, the kamikaze planes had better luck, inflicting severe damage upon Kalinin Bay and sinking St. Lo.

At 11:10, a group of 15 Yokosuka D4Ys was detected approaching by Kitkun Bay. At 11:23, one of the bombers made a run on the carrier, but both of its wings were torn off by AAC fire, and it plunged into the ocean 50 yd (46 m) off her port bow, detonating upon impact and showering the flight deck with seawater. On 26 October, Taffy 3 was instructed to retire to Manus for replenishment and repairs, arriving on 1 November. There, Captain Albert Handly took over command of the vessel. Transiting eastwards, VC-5's planes were detached to Ford Island on the morning of 18 November, and the squadron's pilots were unloaded at Pearl Harbor later that day. She was put into dry dock for repairs, being discharged on 29 November, when she took on Composite Squadron (VC) 91 as her air squadron. Entering Manus on 17 December, Ofstie put on Kitkun Bay again as his flagship. At Manus, preparations were made for the planned landings on Luzon. Kitkun Bay was assigned as the flagship of Task Unit 77.4.3, the Lingayen Protective Group, along with her sister Shamrock Bay.

==== Invasion of Lingayen Gulf ====
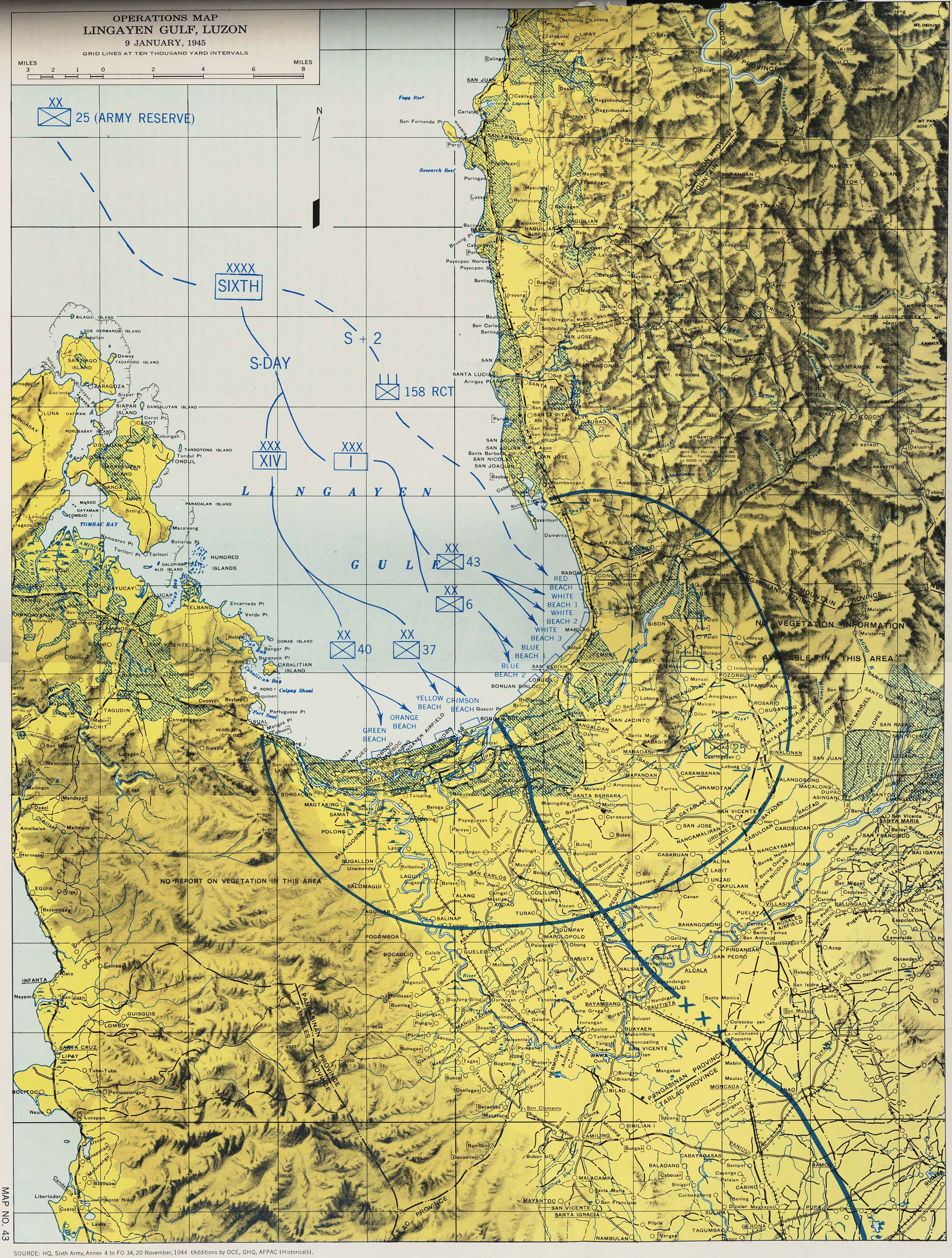
A map showing the U.S. plans for the landings on Lingayen Gulf, in northwest Luzon

On 31 December, the American fleet set out from Seeadler Harbor. En route, until 8 January 1945, when the American fleet arrived within Lingayen Gulf, the task unit's aircraft contingent provided an air screen for the Task Force 79, under the command of Vice Admiral Theodore Stark Wilkinson, which included landing craft, as it transited towards the invasion site. During the latter half the transit, the American fleet was bedeviled by kamikaze planes, which sank Ommaney Bay and damaged both Manila Bay and Kadashan Bay.

On the evening of 8 January, Kitkun Bay was still screening Task Force 79, when at 18:06, a group of Japanese aircraft was detected approaching some 20 mi (32 km) from the southwest. The fighters of Kitkun Bay and Shamrock Bay, which had been conducting air patrols at the time, were diverted to intercept the planes, but two of the kamikaze planes evaded the screen, and at 18:55, soon after the sun had set, one of them, a Japanese Oscar, started its dive upon Kitkun Bay. Undeterred by intense flak, it leveled off slightly around 3,000 yd (2,700 m), before smashing into her portside at 18:57, carving a 7 ft (2.1 m) by 15 ft (4.6 m) hole in her hull, part of which extended below the waterline. Fortunately for Kitkun Bay, the kamikaze's two 550-pound bombs did not arm and detonate, although the explosion of its fuel tank killed four men and ignited a fire. In addition, leading up to impact, a 5-inch/38 caliber AAC round fired, in an attempt to bring down the kamikaze, from one of her friendly escorting ships (likely an adjacent cruiser to starboard of the ship) and burst near her bow under a gun sponson, killing and wounding several, with the blast sending a crewman into the water, where he had to be rescued by the ship's escorting destroyers. Altogether, the attack killed sixteen and wounded thirty-seven.

Kitkun Bay quickly acquired a list of 13° to port, and she was down 4 ft (1.2 m) by her stern. Furthermore, water enveloped the engineering compartments, forcing the crew inside to evacuate, and smoke filtered throughout the belowdecks. Spurred by this serious situation, the entirety of the crew was ordered onto the flight deck, where the aircraft at hand were repositioned towards the starboard side in an attempt to correct the list. All nonessential crew were transferred off the ship onto her screens, and Rear Admiral Ofstie ordered all confidential documents on board to be destroyed, before transferring his complement and himself to the destroyer Smith, which ferried him to Shamrock Bay.

The flames were extinguished by 19:10, and by 19:47, the Abnaki-class fleet ocean tug Chowanoc was on standby to take Kitkun Bay under tow when it was safe. Pumping checked her list down to 4°, and repair parties entering the engine room were able to restore partial power. At 20:42, Chowanac secured a line to her, where they proceeded towards Santiago Island. On the morning of 9 January, she was able to make steam under her own power, and all personnel except the wounded returned later that day. Limited flight operations were even resumed, although she was ordered to retire on 11 January as part of a convoy. Making stops for limited repairs at Leyte Gulf, where she transferred her aircraft off, Manus, and Pearl Harbor, she returned to the United States by late February.

Moored at Terminal Island for repairs and refitting, Kitkun Bay did not set sail again until 27 April, when she underwent a transport mission to Pearl Harbor, where additional repairs were found to be required. After conducting some exercises with her new aircraft contingent, Composite Squadron (VC) 63, she departed on the morning of 15 June for Ulithi, stopping at Guam. There, she reported to Task Force 30.8, the Third Fleet, forming Task Unit 30.8.23 along with her sister Steamer Bay. The two carriers provided screening and antisubmarine patrols for the fast carriers, which launched strikes all along the Japanese islands, and conducted replenishment missions in support of the rest of the fleet. Notably, at this point, the Japanese were conserving their forces for the expected invasion of Japan, and Kitkun Bay encountered little serious opposition in her patrols. Nonetheless, Kitkun Bay suffered men lost during this period. On 4 August, a forge within the shipfitter's shop exploded, burning several men, killing one, and forcing two others overboard to escape the flames, who were later rescued by the destroyer escort Dionne. On 11 August, Captain John Francis Greenslade took over command of the ship at Eniwetok, where on 15 August, the crew of Kitkun Bay received word of the Japanese surrender.

=== After the war ===
Kitkun Bay formed Task Unit 49.5.2, turning out on 16 August for Adak Island. There, she joined several other warships headed towards Mutsu Bay, where Vice Admiral Frank Jack Fletcher accepted the surrender for Japanese forces in northern Honshu and Hokkaido. Then, she steamed southwards into Tokyo Bay. There, she joined the Operation Magic Carpet fleet, which repatriated U.S. servicemen from around the Pacific. In her maiden Magic Carpet voyage, she picked up 554 servicemen in Japan, including ex-POWs, and ferried them to San Francisco. She conducted additional trips to Pearl Harbor and Okinawa, entering San Pedro on 12 January 1946. She then proceeded north along the West Coast, entering Puget Sound on 18 February.

There, Kitkun Bay was decommissioned on 19 April and struck from the Navy list on 8 May. She was sold on 18 November to Zidell Ship Dismantling Company of Portland for $12,700. She was transferred in January 1947 and scrapped sometime in early 1947. Kitkun Bay received six battle stars for World War II service, and along with the rest of Taffy 3, received the Presidential Unit Citation for conduct during the Battle off Samar.
