= Battle of Corregidor (1945) =

WWII battle in the Pacific Theater

- Part of the Pacific Theater of World War II
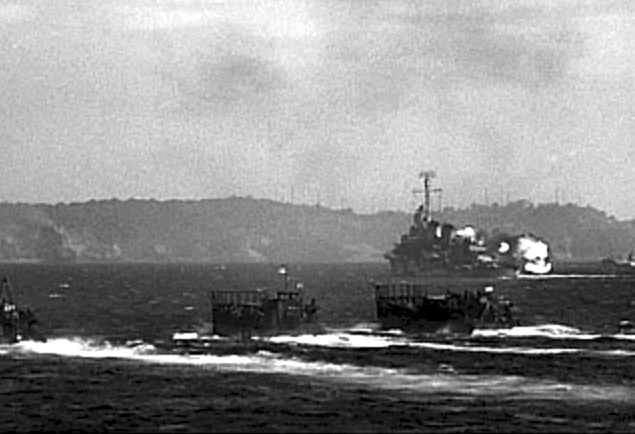
- USS Claxton provides fire support during the Corregidor landings
Date	16–26 February 1945
Location	Corregidor Island, Philippines
Result	American victory

Belligerents
United States	Japan

Commanders and leaders
George M. Jones; Edward M. Postlethwait	Rikichi Tsukada

Strength
7,000 US troops	6,700 Japanese troops

Casualties and losses
207 killed 684 wounded	6,600 killed 50 wounded 19 prisoners 20 surrendered postwar

The Battle of Corregidor (Filipino: Labanan para sa Corregidor), which occurred from 16 to 26 February 1945, pitted American forces against the defending Japanese garrison on the island fortress. The Japanese had captured the bastion from the United States Army Forces in the Far East during their 1942 invasion.

The retaking of the island, officially named Fort Mills, along with the bloody Battle of Manila and the earlier Battle of Bataan, marked the redemption of the American and Filipino surrender on 6 May 1942 and the subsequent fall of the Philippines.

The surrender of Corregidor in 1942 and the ensuing fate of its 11,000 American and Filipino defenders led to a particular sense of moral purpose in General Douglas MacArthur. As shown in the subsequent campaigns for the liberation of the Philippine archipelago, he showed no hesitation in committing the bulk of US and Philippine forces under his command. To the American soldier, Corregidor was more than a military objective; long before the campaign to recapture it, the Rock had become an important symbol in United States history as the last Pacific outpost of any size to fall to the enemy in the early stages of the Pacific War.

== Background ==
=== Capture of Corregidor ===
The Japanese opened their attack on Corregidor with an aerial bombardment on 29 December 1941, several days after MacArthur moved his headquarters there. Still, the heaviest attacks throughout the siege were from artillery based on nearby Cavite and later on Bataan. When the last American and Filipino troops on the peninsula surrendered on 9 April 1942, the Japanese were able to mass artillery for an all-out attack on the Rock and its antiquated batteries.

Including the Malinta Tunnel, the tunnel network that ran through the island's hills protected the defending garrison, but much of the defense activity had to be carried out in the open. By 4 May, many of the guns had been knocked out, the water supply was low, and casualties were mounting. Heavy shellfire preceded Japanese attempts to land the next night, the Japanese later admitted their amazement at the savage resistance, which accounted for the sinking of two-thirds of their landing craft and losses amounting to 900 killed and 1,200 wounded, against US losses of 800 dead and 1,000 wounded.

=== Strategy for recapture ===
Corregidor in 1945—though it lacked the importance to the Japanese defensive strategy that it previously had held for the Americans in early 1942—remained a formidable sentinel to the entrance to Manila Bay. Consequently, American planners thought it merited a separate attack.

MacArthur's strategy was to make a combined amphibious and airborne assault—among the most difficult modern military maneuvers—to retake the island. Although this particular action plan had been used well during the Luzon landings, the airborne phase was risky. As small as it was, at just over five square miles, the tadpole-shaped island made a difficult target for a parachute drop.

Complicating the strategy was that the paratroopers were required to land on a hill known as 'Topside', the island's foremost dominant terrain feature. MacArthur's staff balked at the proposal, but on the other hand, there was little choice. The Japanese could dominate all possible amphibious landing sites from 'Topside'. The American premise was that the Japanese would certainly not expect an airborne landing on such an unlikely target.

The role of recapturing the Rock went to the 503rd Parachute Regimental Combat Team (503rd PRCT) of Lieutenant Colonel George M. Jones and elements of Major General Roscoe B. Woodruff's 24th Infantry Division, the same units which undertook the capture of Mindoro island. The 503rd PRCT included the 503rd Parachute Infantry Regiment, Co. C, 161st Airborne Engineer Battalion and elements of the 462nd Parachute Field Artillery Battalion with 75 mm pack howitzers. They were airlifted by C-47 aircraft of the 317th Troop Carrier Group. The amphibious assault was by the reinforced 3rd Battalion, 34th Infantry Regiment, carried by Landing Craft Mechanized (LCMs) of the 592nd Engineer Boat and Shore Regiment.

== Battle ==
=== Bombardment ===
On 23 January 1945, the aerial bombing to soften up the defenses on Corregidor commenced. Daily strikes by heavy bombers of the United States Army Air Forces (USAAF) continued until 16 February, with 595 short tons (540 t) of bombs dropped. Estimated figures since the bombing campaign started up to 24 February showed 2,028 effective sorties, with 3,163 short tons (2,869 t) of bombs dropped on Corregidor.

On 13 February, the United States Navy added to the bombardment, with cruisers and destroyers shelling from close to shore and braving sporadic Japanese artillery counterfire, with minesweepers operating around the island by the next day. The Island softening up, or gloucesterizing (so-called after an intense pre-invasion bombardment of Cape Gloucester the previous December), lasted three more days.

On 14 February, while assisting minesweeping operations before landings on Corregidor Island, the destroyer USS Fletcher was hit by an enemy shell and set afire. Watertender First Class Elmer Charles Bigelow fought the blaze, contributing greatly to saving his ship, but was badly injured and died the next day. He was posthumously awarded the Medal of Honor for valor and personal sacrifice. YMS-48 was also struck by shore fire and had to be scuttled with 3 MIA/KIA. The USS Hopewell was also struck by shore fire and had casualties.

At sunrise on 16 February, attacks by Consolidated B-24 Liberators and an hour of low-altitude bombing and strafing runs by Douglas A-20s preceded the landings.

=== Touchdown on Topside ===
At 08:33 on 16 February, barely three minutes after their intended time and facing 16–18 knot winds over the drop zones, the first of one thousand troopers of the 503rd Parachute Regimental Combat Team began dropping out of C-47 troop carriers of the US 317th Troop Carrier Group of the 5th Air Force and to float down on the surprised Japanese defenders, remnants of Maj. Gen. Rikichi Tsukada's Kembu Group at the two tiny go-point areas of Topside's western heights. However, some paratroopers were blown back into Japanese held territory. No troopers drowned, although some who were unable to climb the cliffs through hostile territory, or had fallen close to the rocks, had to be rescued near Wheeler Point.

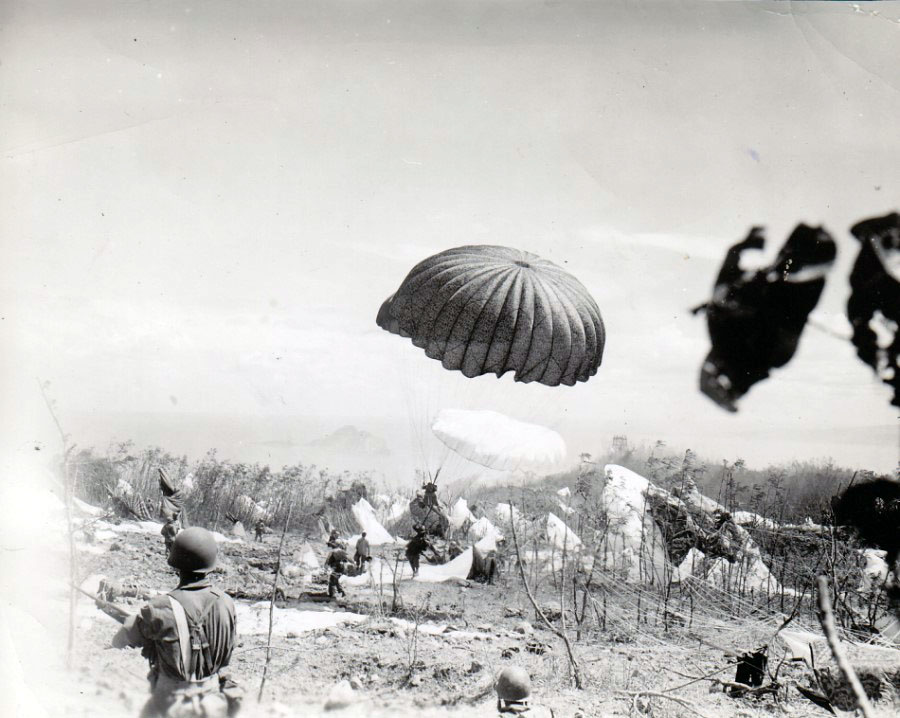
Paratroopers of the 503rd PRCT descend on Corregidor, 16 February 1945.

Despite the grueling air and naval bombardment that left the defending troops dazed and scattered, they rallied and fierce fighting erupted almost immediately. At one point that same morning, they threatened to drive a salient into the paratroopers' tenuous foothold on 'Topside'.

Paratroopers and infantrymen waged a tenacious battle with the well dug-in and determined enemy. Private Lloyd G. McCarter, a scout attached to the 503rd, during the initial landing on 16 February, crossed 30 yd (27 m) of open ground under intense fire and at point-blank range, silenced a machine gun with hand grenades. In the next few days, he inflicted heavy casualties on the Japanese, but was seriously wounded; McCarter was awarded the Medal of Honor.

=== Battle of Banzai Point ===
The most ferocious battle to regain Corregidor occurred at Wheeler Point on the night of 18 February and early the following morning, when D and F Companies, 2nd Battalion, 503rd PRCT, settled down in defensive positions near Battery Hearn and Cheney Trail. At 22:30 under a moonless night, 500 Japanese marines came out of the Battery Smith armory and charged the American and the Philippine positions. F Company stopped the attacks by the Japanese trying to break through to the south. Aside from flares fired throughout the night by warships lying offshore, the three-hour battle was decided by the weapons of the 50 paratroopers ranged against the Japanese marines. The savage encounter failed with more than 250 Japanese corpses strewn along a 200 yd (180 m) stretch of Cheney Trail. F Company suffered 14 dead and 15 wounded. This was the first significant attack by the Japanese on Corregidor. Official historians of the 503rd refer to Wheeler Point as "Banzai Point."

=== Seizure of Malinta Hill ===
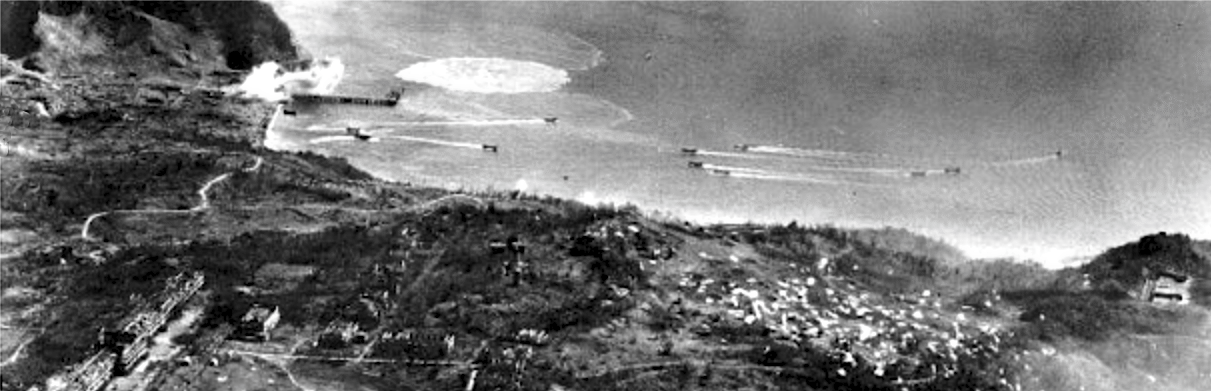
34th Infantry lands at San Jose Point

At the same time the 503rd paratroopers touched down at 'Topside', the first wave of 3rd Battalion under Lt. Col. Edward M. Postlethwait of the 24th Infantry Division's 34th Infantry Regiment (under Col. Aubrey S. "Red" Newman) waded ashore and established a beachhead at San Jose Point on the eastern end of Corregidor named 'Black Beach'. The succeeding waves of troops took the brunt of the hastily organized Japanese defense, and several landing craft and infantrymen became victims of landmines. The battalion pushed inland against sporadic resistance, mostly from groups coming out of the subterranean passages of the island to waylay the advancing American troops.

Two 3rd Battalion units—K and L Companies under Captains Frank Centanni and Lewis F. Stearns, respectively—managed to secure the road and northern and southern entrances to Malinta Hill, while Capt. Gilbert Heaberlin's A Company stationed itself near the waterline. I Company—under 1st Lt. Paul Cain—occupied the North Dock and guarded the harbor. They intended to keep the Japanese troops inside the tunnel as other units moved inland, accompanied by tanks and flamethrowers; weapons that devastated pillboxes and tunnels in the surrounding areas held by the Japanese. For eight straight days until 23 February, these units staved off successive banzai charges, mortar attacks, and a suicide squad of soldiers with explosives strapped to their bodies; they killed over 300 Japanese.

On 21 February at 21:30 near Malinta Hill, a few dozen Japanese survivors were killed attacking US positions following a large explosion. Two nights later, a similar attack happened. Subsequently, American engineers poured and ignited large quantities of gasoline down the tunnels. The lack of Japanese activity afterwards implied that the Japanese garrison had been wiped out.

For the rest of the campaign, there were no more organized Japanese attacks. Only isolated pockets of resistance continued to fight until 26 February, when Corregidor was declared secured.

== Aftermath ==
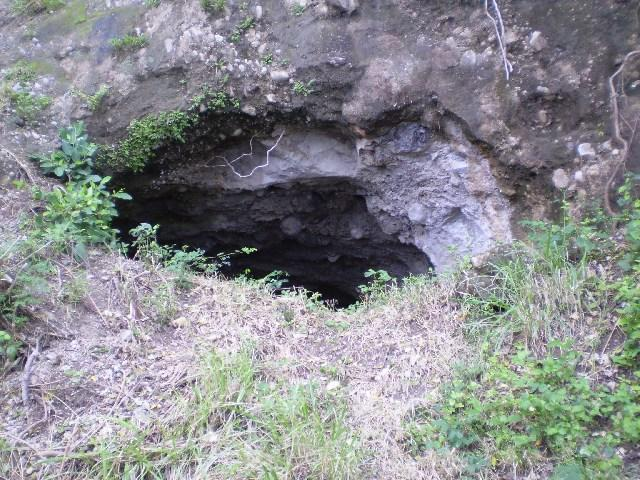
The remains of a Japanese cave

Large numbers of Japanese troops drowned while attempting to swim away from the Rock. Many of them, estimated in the thousands, sealed themselves in the numerous subterranean passages of the island. In compliance with the philosophy of Bushidō, the defenders, hiding in caves and tunnels like the ones at Malinta Hill, preferred to commit suicide rather than surrender. Corregidor reverberated with many underground explosions for days afterward.

There were very few Japanese soldiers captured. An M4 Sherman tank fired a shell into a sealed tunnel suspected of harboring Japanese soldiers, but which instead contained tons of stored ammunition. The subsequent explosion threw the 30 short tons (27 t) tank several dozen feet, killing its crew and 48 US soldiers nearby, and wounded more than 100 others in the immediate area.

By 1 March, Manila Bay officially opened to Allied shipping. On 2 March, Gen. MacArthur returned to the island fortress he had been forced to leave three years before. "I see that the old flagpole still stands. Have your troops hoist the colors to its peak and let no enemy ever again haul it down", he said, at the ceremonial raising of the Stars and Stripes.

The coordinated triphibious American assault to recapture Corregidor left the 503rd PRCT with 169 dead and 531 wounded. The 34th Infantry Regiment suffered 38 killed and 153 wounded. Of the 2,065 men of both lifts by the 503rd PRCT, three men suffered parachute malfunctions, and two men who collided with buildings died. Eight men were killed either in the air or before they were able to get free of their chutes, a further 50 were wounded in the air or upon landing. Several men were missing in action at the drop. The total injuries (not by wounding) on the drop were 210.

Japanese sources have estimated that there were about 6,700 Japanese on the island when the 503rd PRCT and 34th Infantry landed, of which only 50 survived. Another 19 were taken prisoner, and 20 Japanese holdouts surfaced after the war on 1 January 1946.

Today, Corregidor is a tourist destination in the Philippines. Over the years, most of the island's decrepit artillery pieces and significant battle sites have been restored as important historical landmarks.

== See also ==
- Military History of the Philippines
- Military History of the United States
- Military History of Japan
- History of the Philippines
- Philippines campaign (1941–1942)
