= Battle of Leyte order of battle =

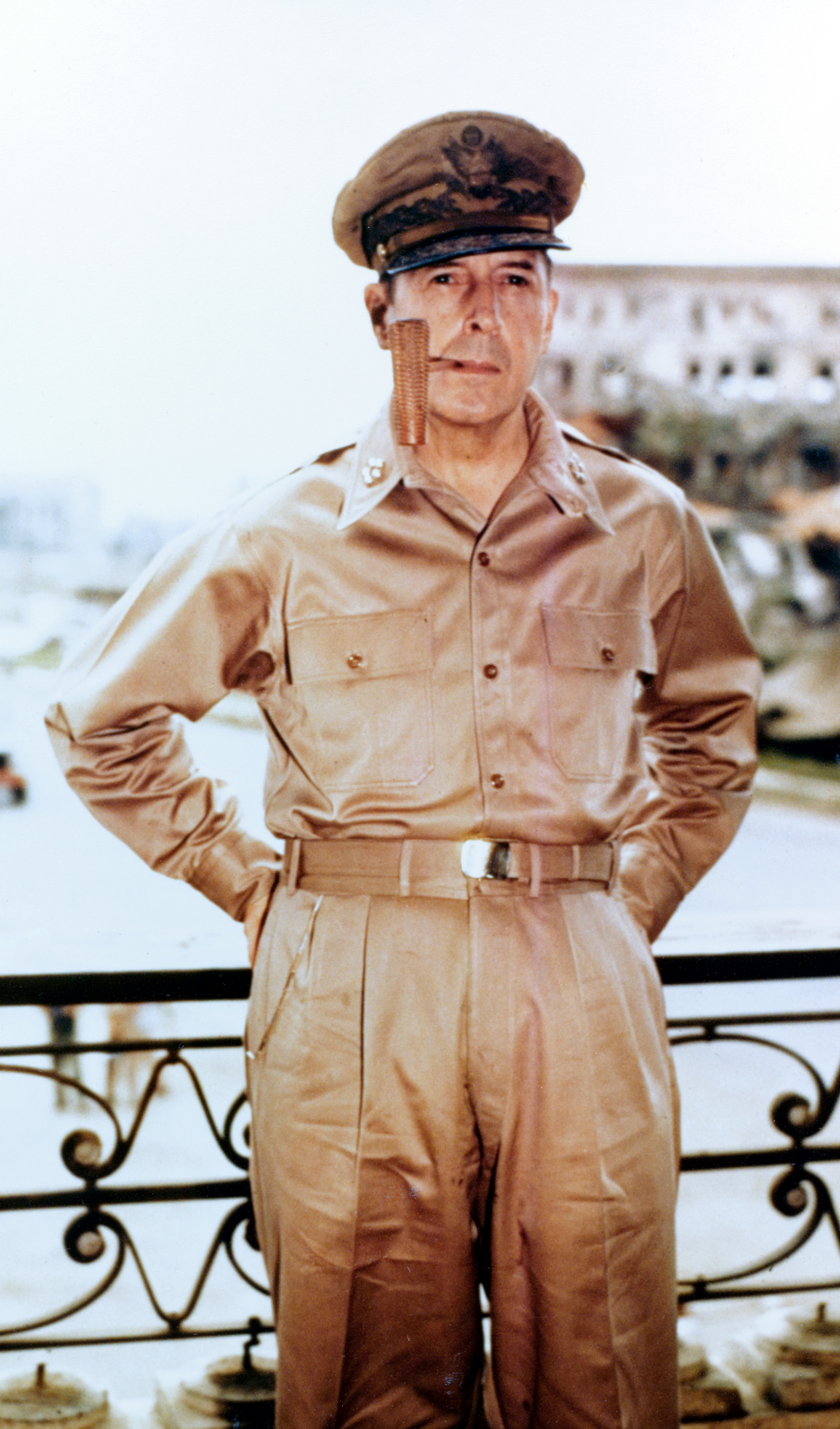
Gen. Douglas MacArthur

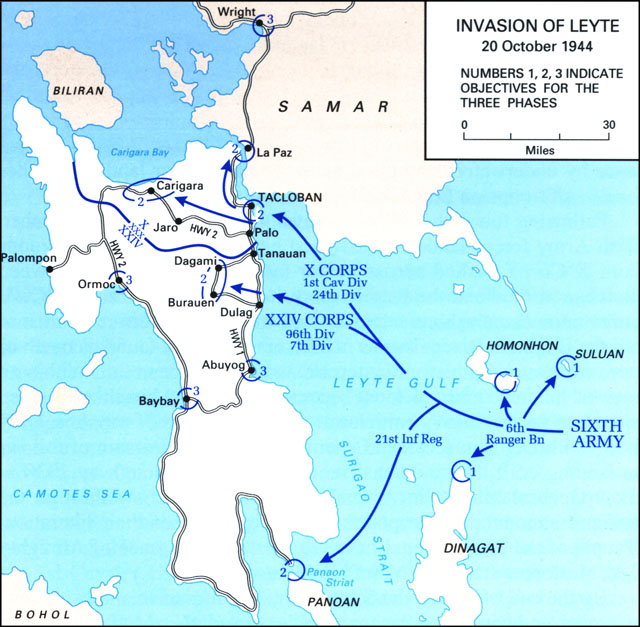
Initial US Army landings on Leyte

On 20 October 1944, troops of the United States Sixth Army under the direct command of Lieutenant General Walter Krueger, invaded the Philippine island of Leyte. This operation was the beginning of General Douglas MacArthur's fulfillment of his promise in March 1942 to the Filipino people that he would liberate them from Japanese rule.

The choice of Leyte was the result of heated discussion at the highest levels of the US military and government. Chief of Naval Operations Admiral Ernest J. King had forcefully advocated for an invasion of the island of Formosa, about 300 miles (480 km) north of the Philippines, insisting that it would both bolster the morale of the Nationalist Chinese, then fighting the Japanese occupation of their country, and provide a much closer base for military operations against the Japanese home islands. In the event, MacArthur's viewpoint that the United States needed to be seen as following through on its promise to liberate the Filipino people from Japanese oppression won out.

Summary of US ground forces:

US Sixth Army
Lieutenant General Walter Krueger
Approx. 202,500 total officers and enlisted

Northern landing area

X Army Corps
Lieutenant General Franklin C. Sibert

Left: 24th Infantry ("Taro") Division
Right: 1st Cavalry Division

Southern landing area

XXIV Army Corps
Lieutenant General John R. Hodge

Left: 7th Infantry ("Bayonet") Division
Right: 96th Infantry ("Deadeye") Division
Reserve: 11th Airborne ("Angels") Division

Reserves

Landed 14 Nov: 32nd Infantry ("Red Arrow") Division
Landed 23 Nov: 77th Infantry ("Statue of Liberty") Division

== United States ==
Ground force commanders for the invasion of Leyte

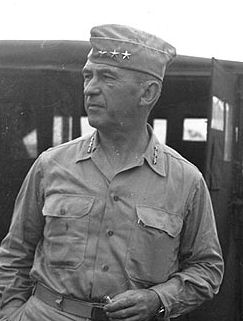
Sixth Army commander Walter Krueger

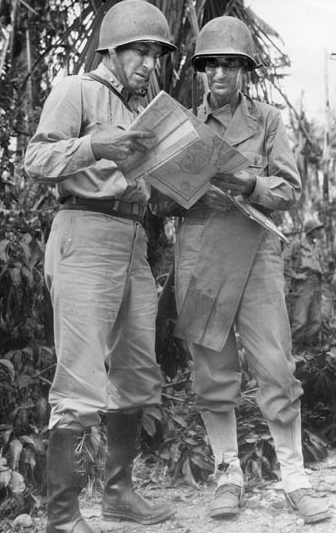
X Corps commander Franklin C. Sibert and division commander Frederick A. Irving

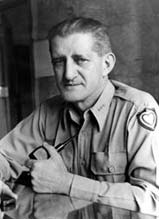
XXIV Corps commander John R. Hodge

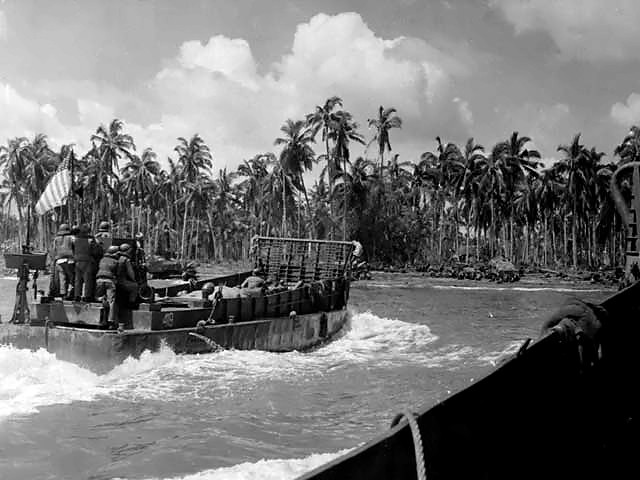
Waves of men and machines near the invasion beachhead aboard powerful LCMs (landing craft mechanized) during the invasion of Leyte

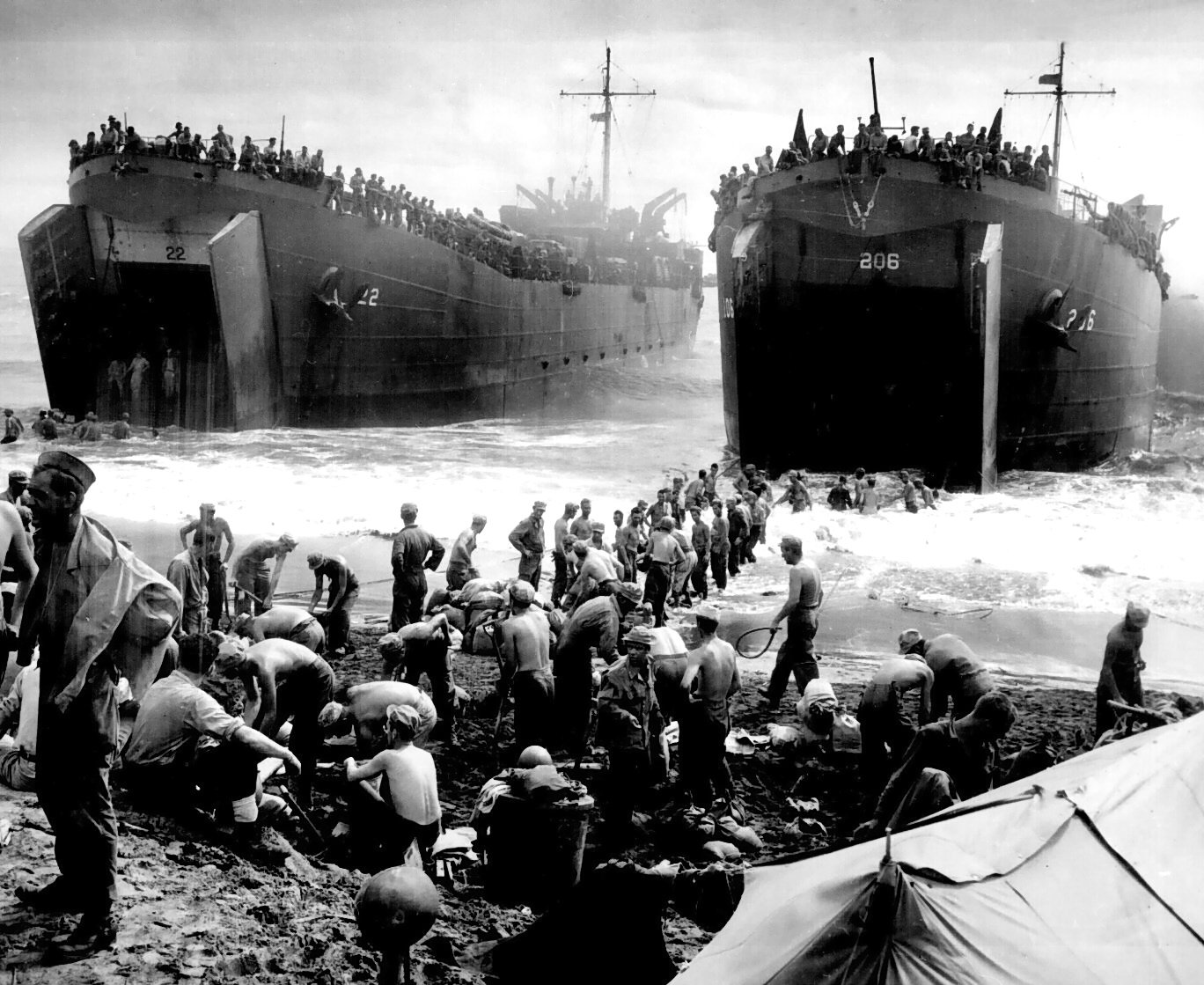
Coast Guard-manned LSTs on Leyte

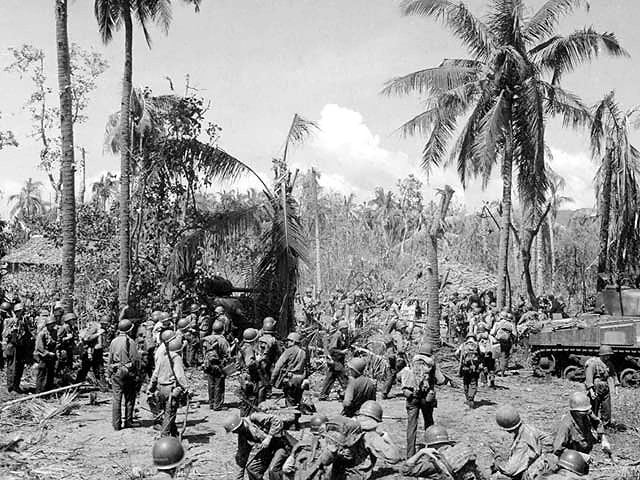
Men and equipment on Leyte beachhead

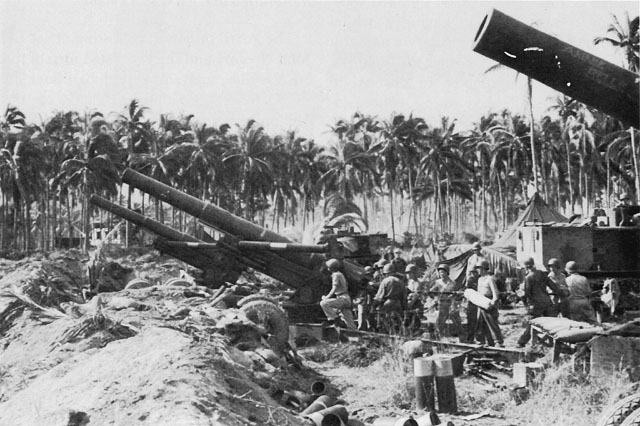
US 8-inch howitzers of the 61st Field Artillery Battalion readied near Tacloban

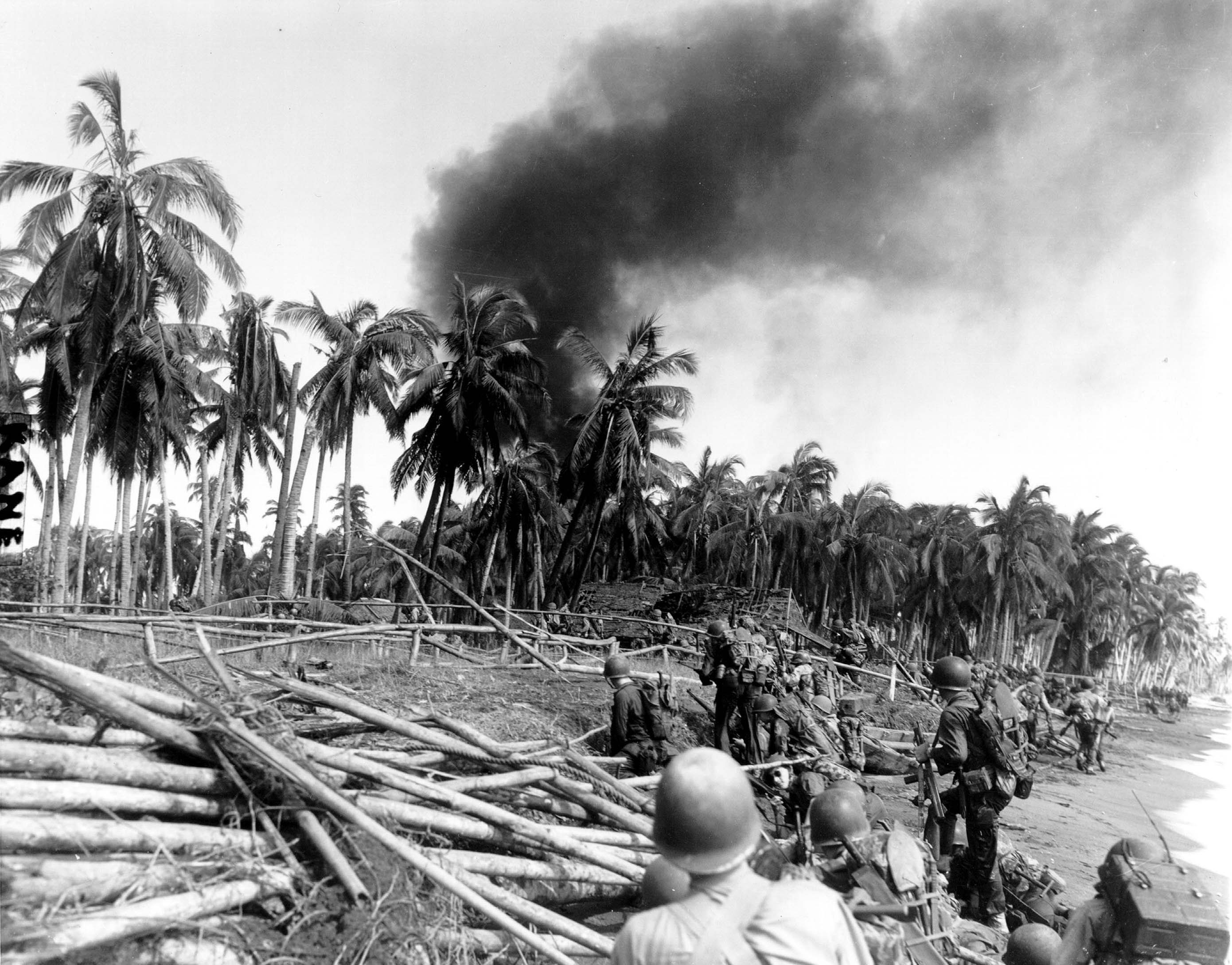
Men of the 7th Cavalry on Leyte

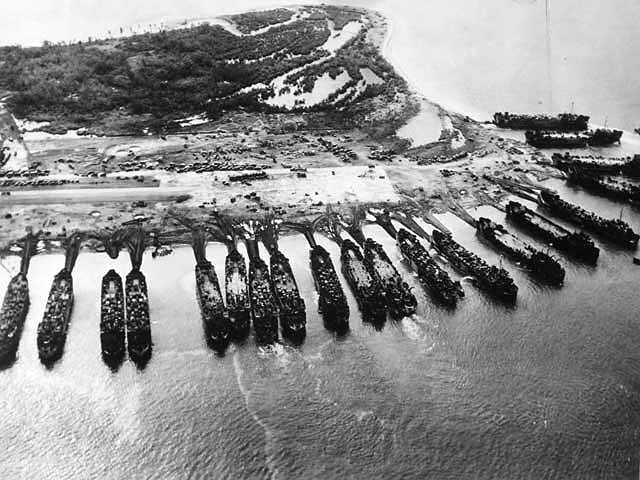
Amphibious craft anchored at Leyte

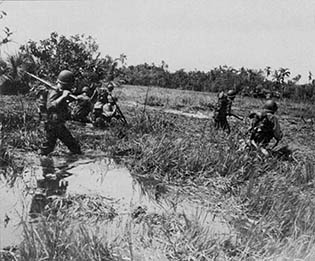
Men of the 1st Cavalry Division on Leyte, December 1944

Southwest Pacific Area
General Douglas MacArthur

US Sixth Army
Lieutenant General Walter Krueger
Approx. 202,500 officers and enlisted

Army-level units

2nd Engineer Support Brigade
6th Ranger Battalion
21st Infantry Regiment (Note: Detached from 24th Infantry Division)

=== Northern landing area ===
X Army Corps
Lieutenant General Franklin C. Sibert

Embarked in Task Force 78 under Rear Admiral Daniel E. Barbey

Left sector (Red Beaches)

24th Infantry ("Taro") Division
Major General Frederick A. Irving

Infantry

Left: 19th Infantry Regiment
Right: 34th Infantry Regiment

CMoH recipients: Pvt. Harold H. Moon Jr. (KIA 21 Oct), Sgt. Charles E. Mower (KIA 3 Nov), Capt. Francis B. Wai (KIA 20 Oct)

Artillery

13th, 52nd, 63rd FA Battalions (105mm)
11th FA Battalion (155mm)

Division troops

3rd Engineer Combat Battalion
24th Reconnaissance Troop (Mechanized)
24th Medical Battalion
24th Counterintelligence Corps Detachment

Right sector (White Beaches)

1st Cavalry Division
Major General Verne D. Mudge

1st Cavalry Brigade HQ (Brigadier General William C. Chase)

Left: 5th Cavalry Regiment
Center: 12th Cavalry Regiment

2nd Cavalry Brigade HQ (Brigadier General Hugh F. T. Hoffman)

Right: 7th Cavalry Regiment
Reserve: 8th Cavalry Regiment

61st, 82nd, 99th, 271st FA Battalions (105mm)
302nd Reconnaissance Troop (Mechanized)
603rd Medium Tank Company
801st Counterintelligence Corps Detachment

=== Southern landing area ===
XXIV Army Corps
Lieutenant General John R. Hodge

Embarked in Task Force 79 under Vice Admiral Theodore S. Wilkinson

Left sector (Yellow and Violet Beaches)

7th Infantry ("Bayonet") Division
Major General Archibald V. Arnold

Infantry

Left (Yellow): 184th Infantry Regiment
Right (Violet): 32nd Infantry Regiment
Reserve: 17th Infantry Regiment

CMoH recipients: PFC Leonard C. Brostrom (KIA 28 Oct), PFC John F. Thorson (KIA 28 Oct)

Artillery

48th, 49th, 57th FA Battalions (105mm)
31st FA Battalion (155mm)

Division troops

7th Reconnaissance Troop (Mechanized)
13th Engineer Combat Battalion
7th Medical Battalion
7th Counterintelligence Corps Detachment

Right sector (Blue and Orange Beaches)

96th Infantry ("Deadeye") Division
Major General James L. Bradley

Infantry

Left (Blue): 382nd Infantry Regiment

CMoH recipient: Pvt. Ova A. Kelley (KIA 10 Dec)

Right (Orange): 383rd Infantry Regiment
Reserve: 381st Infantry Regiment

Artillery

361st, 362nd, 921st FA Battalions (105mm)
363rd FA Battalion (155mm)

Division troops

96th Reconnaissance Troop (Mechanized)
321st Engineer Combat Battalion
321st Medical Battalion
96th Counterintelligence Corps Detachment

Other units

20th Armored Group
503rd Parachute Infantry Regiment

XXIV Corps Reserve – Landed 18 Nov

11th Airborne ("Angels") Division
Major General Joseph M. Swing

Infantry

187th Glider Infantry Regiment
188th Glider Infantry Regiment
511th Parachute Infantry Regiment

CMoH recipient: Pvt. Elmer E. Fryar (KIA 8 Dec)

Artillery

674th Glider FA Battalion (75mm)
675th Glider FA Battalion (75mm)
457th Parachute FA Battalion (75mm)

Division troops

127th Airborne Engineer Battalion
157th Airborne Anti-Aircraft Battalion
221st Airborne Medical Company
11th Parachute Maintenance Company

Other XXIV Corps units

20th Armored Group
503rd Parachute Infantry Regiment

=== Sixth Army reserve ===
Landed 14 Nov, relieved 24th Inf. Div.

32nd Infantry ("Red Arrow") Division

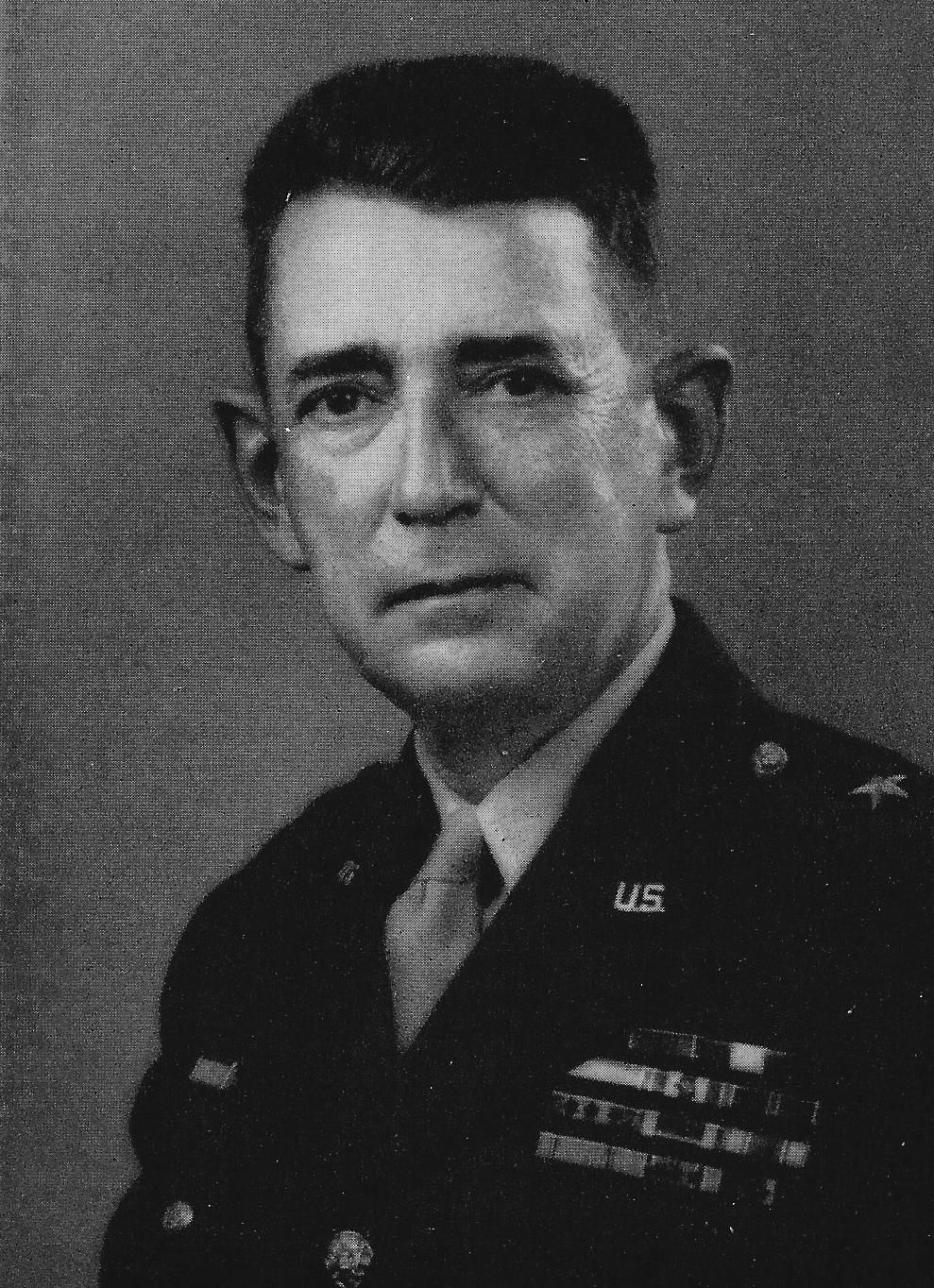
Maj. Gen. William H. Gill

Major General William H. Gill

Infantry

126th Infantry Regiment

CMoH recipients: PFC Dirk J. Vlug, Sgt. Leroy Johnson (KIA 15 Dec), PFC William A. McWhorter (KIA 5 Dec)

127th Infantry Regiment
128th Infantry Regiment

Artillery

120th, 126th, 129th FA Battalions (105mm)
121st FA Battalion (155mm)

Division troops

114th Engineer Combat Battalion
32nd Reconnaissance Troop (Mechanized)
107th Medical Battalion
32nd Counterintelligence Corps Detachment

Landed 23 Nov south of Ormoc

77th Infantry ("Statue of Liberty") Division

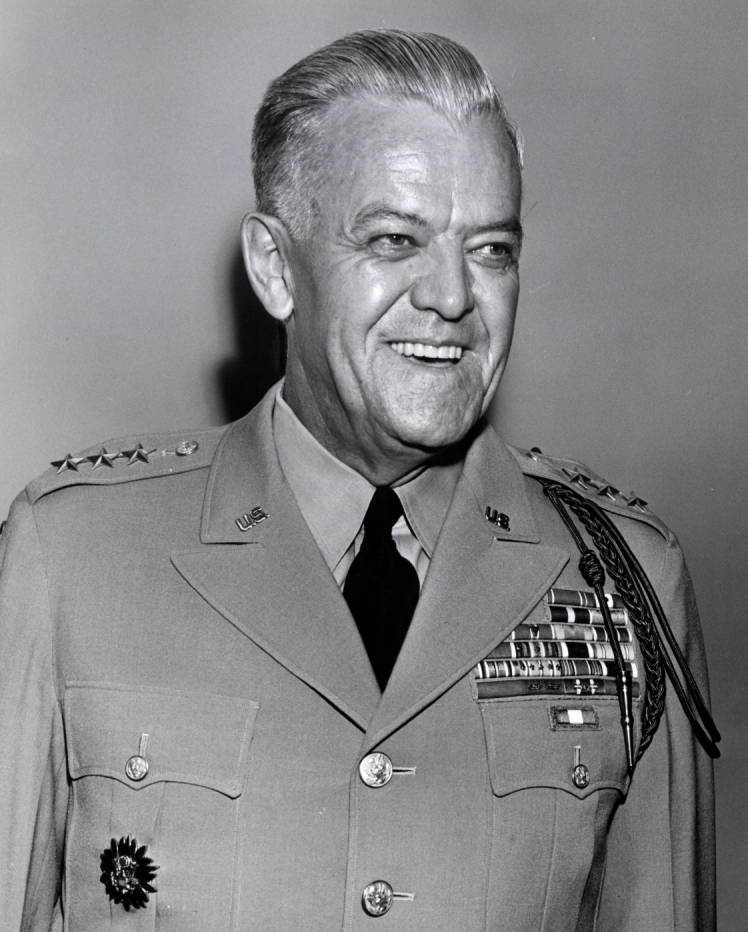
Maj. Gen. Andrew D. Bruce

Major General Andrew D. Bruce

Infantry

305th Infantry Regiment

CMoH recipient: Lt. Robert B. Nett

306th Infantry Regiment

CMoH recipient: PFC George Benjamin Jr.

307th Infantry Regiment

Artillery

304th, 305th, 902nd FA Battalions (105mm)
306th FA Battalion (155mm)

Division troops

302nd Engineer Combat Battalion
77th Reconnaissance Troop (Mechanized)
302nd Medical Battalion
77th Counterintelligence Corps Detachment

== Japan ==
Japanese commanders concerned in Leyte campaign

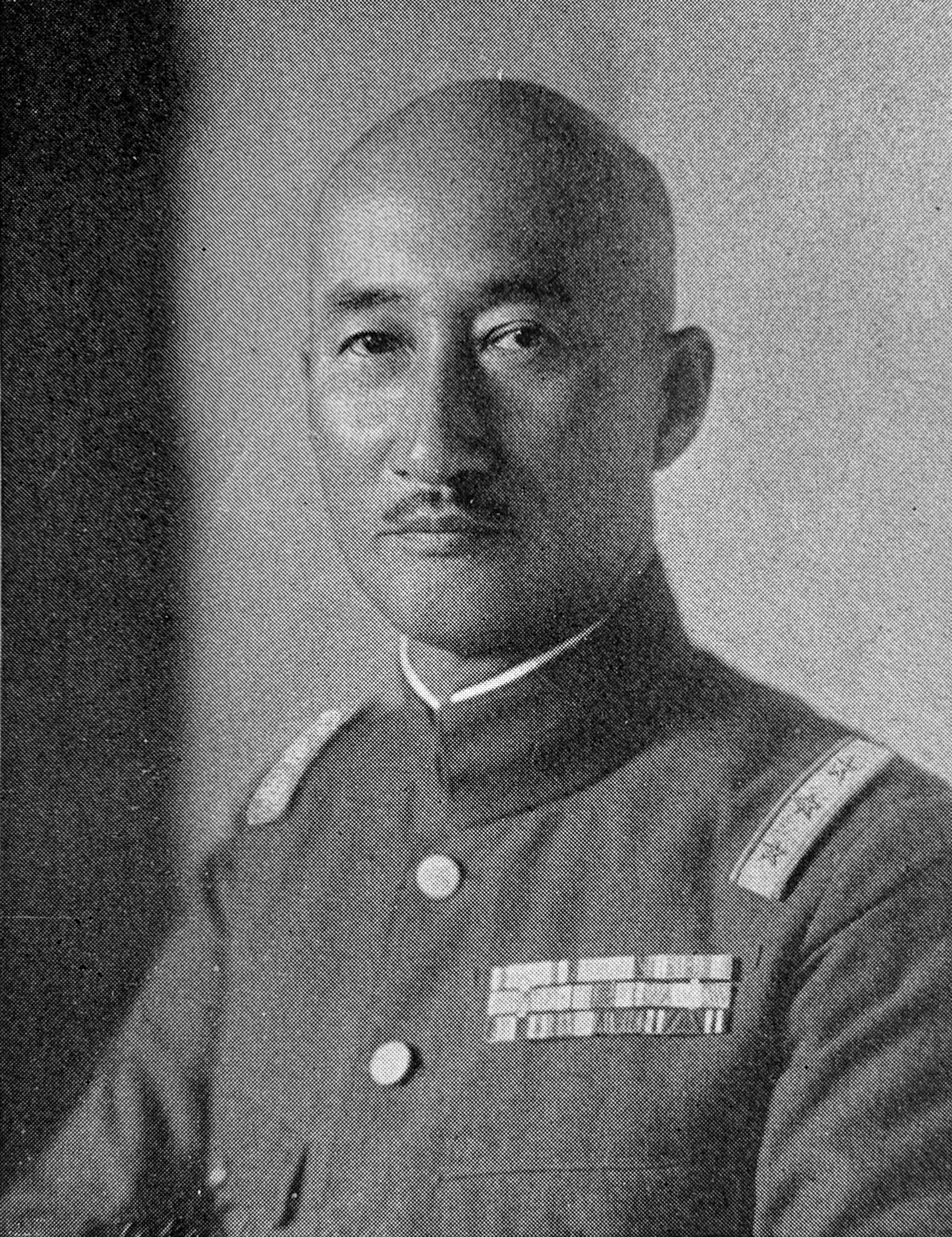
Count Hisaichi Terauchi

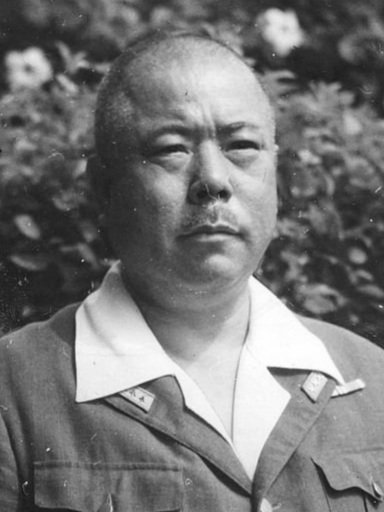
General Tomoyuki Yamashita

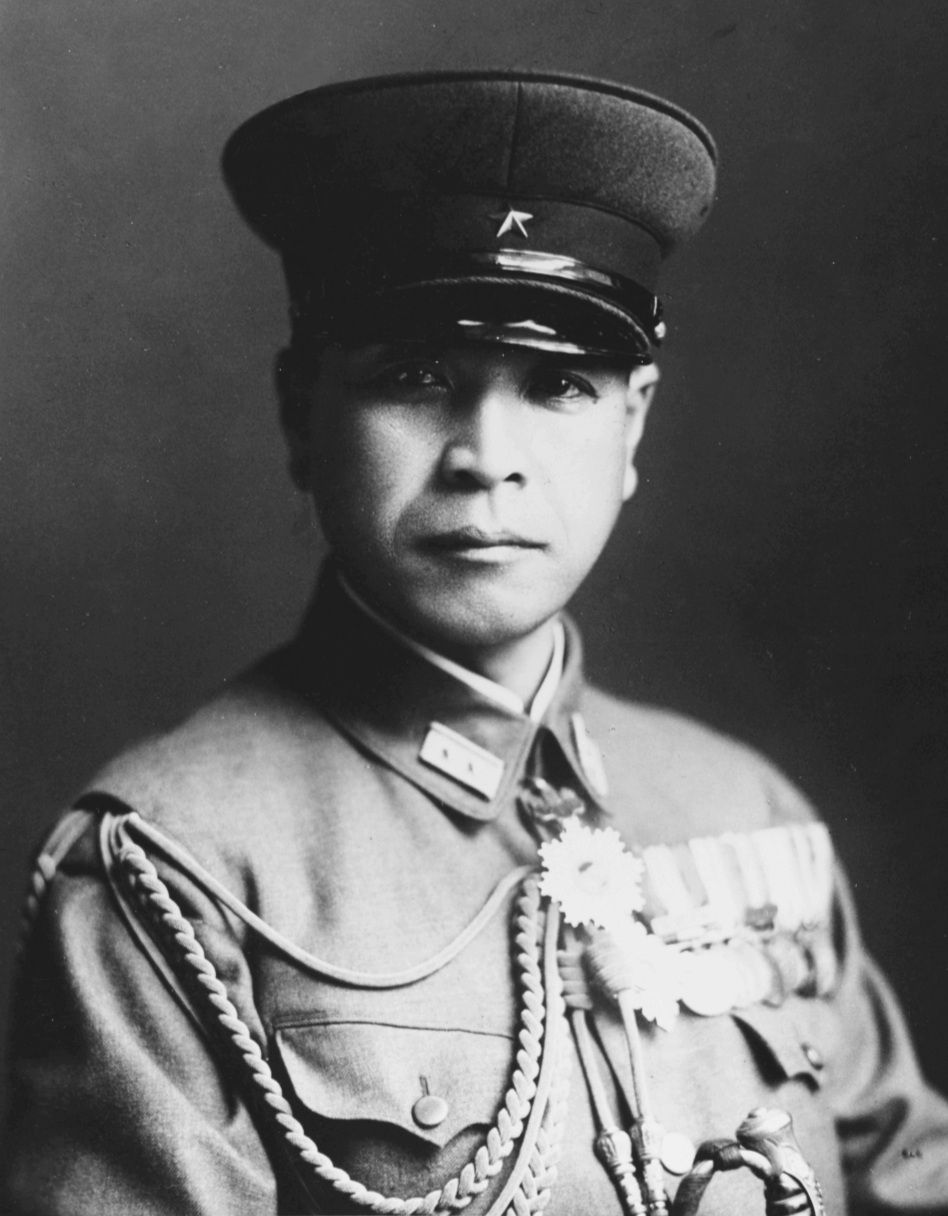
Lieut. Gen. Sosaku Suzuki

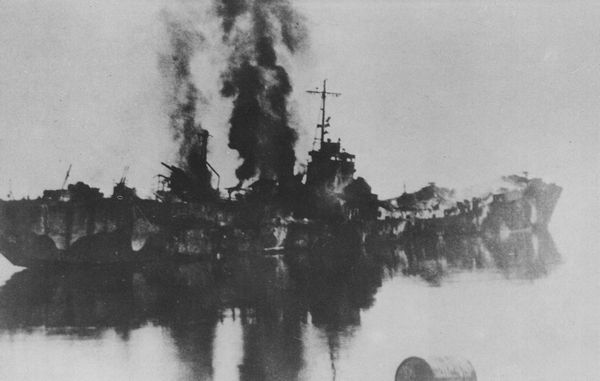
Japanese landing ship LS-159 burning at Ormoc Bay on Leyte's west coast

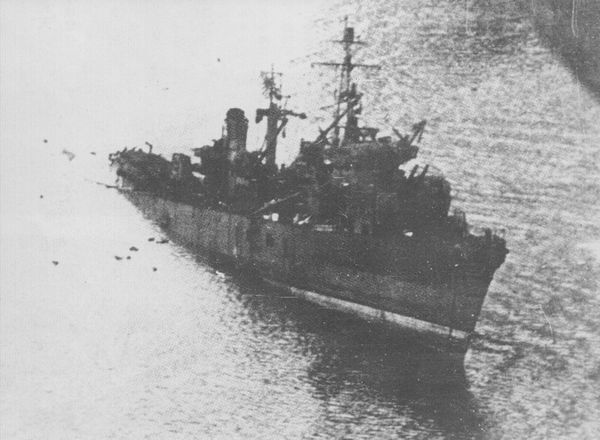
IJN landing ship No.11 at San Isidro, northwest of Leyte

Southern Army (Southeast Asia)
Field Marshal Count Hisaichi Terauchi (Note: Died before he could be tried for war crimes) at Manila

Fourteenth Area Army (Note: A Japanese area army was equivalent to a Euro-American army.)
General Tomoyuki Yamashita (Note: Hanged for atrocities committed by men under his command)

Thirty-Fifth Army (Note: A Japanese army was equivalent to a Euro-American corps.)
Lieutenant General Sosaku Suzuki (Note: KIA on Cebu 19 April 1945)

1st Division
16th Division
26th Division
102nd Division
Elements of 30th Division
54th Independent Mixed Brigade
55th Independent Mixed Brigade
68th Independent Mixed Brigade

Third Shipping Transport Command
Major General Masazumi Inada (Note: Served approx. seven-year sentence for covering up war crimes)

Leyte Defense Forces

16th Division
Lieutenant General Shiro Makino (Note: Committed suicide 10 August 1945)

9th Infantry Regiment (Note: Less three companies on Samar)
20th Infantry Regiment
33rd Infantry Regiment (Note: Less one company on Samar)
22nd Artillery Regiment (Note: Less 3rd Battalion on Luzon)
16th Engineer Regiment (Note: Less one company)
Miscellaneous units

2nd Company, 16th Transport Regiment
7th Independent Tank Company
16th Division Special Troops
Thirty-Fifth Army Depots units
Elements, 63rd Motor Transport Battalion
316th Independent Motor Transport Company
317th Independent Motor Transport Company

34th Air Sector Command

98th Airfield Battalion
114th Airfield Battalion
54th Airfield Company
2nd Airfield Construction Unit
11th Airfield Construction Unit

Naval Land Forces

Elements, 36th Naval Garrison Unit
311th Naval Construction Unit

Air Forces

Fourth Air Army at Manila
Lieutenant General Kyoji Tominaga (Note: Transferred to Manchukuo, held by USSR as a POW for approx. ten years)

2nd Air Division
4th Air Division

IJN Fifth Base Air Force under on Formosa
Vice Admiral Kinpei Teraoka

== Bibliography ==
Print

- Chun, Clayton (2015). Leyte 1944: Return to the Philippines. Oxford: Osprey. ISBN 978-1-4728-0690-1.
- Stanton, Shelby L. (1984). World War II Order of Battle. New York: Galahad Books. ISBN 0-88365-775-9.

Web

- "World War II Divisional Combat Chronicles". history.army.mil.
