= Lloyd G. McCarter =

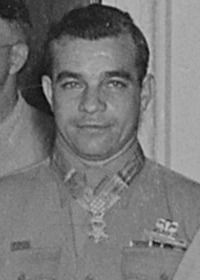
- Lloyd McCarter after receiving his Medal of Honor from President Harry S. Truman on August 23, 1945
- Born: May 11, 1917; St. Maries, Idaho
- Died: February 2, 1956 (aged 38); Saint Maries, Idaho
- Burial place: Woodlawn Cemetery, Saint Maries, Idaho
- Military career
- Allegiance: United States of America
- Branch: United States Army
- Rank: Private
- Unit: 503d PIR
- Conflicts: World War II
- Awards: Medal of Honor

Lloyd G. McCarter (May 11, 1917 – February 2, 1956) was a Private in the 503rd Parachute Infantry Regiment of the United States Army who was awarded the Medal of Honor during the battle to recapture Corregidor Island in the Philippines.

== Medal of Honor citation ==
Rank and Organization: Private, U.S. Army, 503d Parachute Infantry Regiment. Place and Date Corregidor, Philippine Islands, February 16, 19, 1945. Entered Service at: Tacoma, Wash. Born: May 11, 1917, St. Maries, Idaho. G.O. No.: 77, September 10, 1945.

Citation:

He was a scout with the regiment which seized the fortress of Corregidor, Philippine Islands. Shortly after the initial parachute assault on 16 February 1945, he crossed 30 yards of open ground under intense enemy fire, and at pointblank range silenced a machinegun with hand grenades. On the afternoon of 18 February he killed 6 snipers. That evening, when a large force attempted to bypass his company, he voluntarily moved to an exposed area and opened fire. The enemy attacked his position repeatedly throughout the night and was each time repulsed. By 2 o'clock in the morning, all the men about him had been wounded; but shouting encouragement to his comrades and defiance at the enemy, he continued to bear the brunt of the attack, fearlessly exposing himself to locate enemy soldiers and then pouring heavy fire on them. He repeatedly crawled back to the American line to secure more ammunition. When his submachine gun would no longer operate, he seized an automatic rifle and continued to inflict heavy casualties. This weapon, in turn, became too hot to use and, discarding it, he continued with an M-1 rifle. At dawn the enemy attacked with renewed intensity. Completely exposing himself to hostile fire, he stood erect to locate the most dangerous enemy positions. He was seriously wounded; but, though he had already killed more than 30 of the enemy, he refused to evacuate until he had pointed out immediate objectives for attack. Through his sustained and outstanding heroism in the face of grave and obvious danger, Pvt. McCarter made outstanding contributions to the success of his company and to the recapture of Corregidor."

== Awards and decorations ==

Badge	Combat Infantryman Badge		
1st row	Medal of Honor		Bronze Star Medal
2nd row	Purple Heart	Army Good Conduct Medal	American Campaign Medal
3rd row	Asiatic-Pacific Campaign Medal with 1 Campaign star	World War II Victory Medal	Philippine Liberation Medal
Badge	Basic Parachutists Badge		
Unit awards	Presidential Unit Citation		

== Later life ==
McCarter was discharged from military service in 1945 due to wounds received in the action on Corregidor. He later married, but lost his wife to cancer. He took his own life in February 1956.

== See also ==
- List of Medal of Honor recipients
- List of Medal of Honor recipients for World War II
