= Charles Bernadou Elliott =

US Army colonel

- Elliott as commander of Fort Bragg in 1941
- Born: 27 June 1882; Washington, D.C., US
- Died: 24 February 1958 (aged 75); Washington, D.C., US
- Burial place: Arlington National Cemetery
- Education: United States Army Command and General Staff College; United States Army War College
- Spouse: Katie Bell Riggin (m. 1910–1958)
- Children: 2
- Military career
- Service: United States Army
- Service years: 1901–1942
- Rank: Colonel
- Service number: O1987
- Unit: US Army Infantry Branch
- Commands: 3rd Battalion, 23rd Infantry Regiment; Tactical Course, II Corps School; Reserve Affairs, Fourth Corps Area; 34th Infantry Regiment; Fort Bragg; 9th Infantry Division
- Conflicts: Philippine–American War; Moro Rebellion; Mexican Border War; World War I Occupation of the Rhineland; World War II
- Awards: Distinguished Service Cross; Silver Star; Purple Heart; Legion of Honor (Chevalier) (France); Croix de Guerre with palm (France)

Charles Bernadou Elliott (27 June 1882 – 24 February 1958) was a career officer in the United States Army. A veteran of the Philippine–American War, Moro Rebellion, Mexican Border War, World War I, and World War II, he served from 1901 to 1942 and attained the rank of colonel. Elliott's commands included: 3rd Battalion, 23rd Infantry Regiment; Tactical Course, II Corps School; Reserve Affairs, Fourth Corps Area; 34th Infantry Regiment; Fort Bragg; and 9th Infantry Division. His awards and decorations included the Distinguished Service Cross, Silver Star, Purple Heart, French Legion of Honor (Chevalier), and French Croix de Guerre with palm.

== Early life and start of career ==
Charles B. Elliott was born in Washington, D.C. on 27 June 1882, a son of Henry Randall Elliott Sr. and Helen Charlotte (Tompkins) Elliott. He was raised and educated in Washington and in Alexandria, Virginia and completed high school at Alexandria's Washington School in June 1899.

In November 1901, Elliott began his military career when he enlisted in the United States Army. Assigned to the 11th Cavalry Regiment at Fort Myer, Virginia, he received promotion to corporal and sergeant while preparing to take the examination for an officer's commission. On 5 October 1904, he received his commission as a second lieutenant of Infantry. Elliott was assigned to the 30th Infantry Regiment, with which he remained until 1914, including service in the Philippines during the Philippine–American War (1902 to 1904) and Moro Rebellion (1907 to 1909). He was promoted to first lieutenant in March 1911 and served in Alaska from 1912 to 1914.

=== Family ===
In December 1910, Elliott married Katie Bell Riggin; they were married until his death and were the parents of two children. Charles Bernadou Elliott Jr. (1911–1980) was a 1934 graduate of the United States Military Academy and retired from the army as a colonel in 1964. Rosabell Elliott (1913–1991) was the wife of Kentucky attorney Thomas Waller Threlkeld.

== Continued career ==
From 1914 to 1917, Elliott served as senior instructor and inspector for the New Jersey National Guard and he was promoted to captain in July 1916. From 1917 to 1918 he performed Mexican Border War duty in Texas as a member of 3rd Battalion, 23rd Infantry Regiment, a unit of the 2nd Division. In August 1917, he was promoted to temporary major. During World War I, Elliott served in France, first as an observer with the Canadian Expeditionary Force, then as a student in the tactics course at the I Corps School near Gondrecourt-le-Château.

Elliott subsequently commanded 3rd Battalion, 23rd Infantry, and he received the Distinguished Service Cross for heroism in fighting near Château-Thierry on 6 and 7 June 1918, during which he was injured by poison gas. He also received the Silver Star for heroism during fighting at the Bois de la Marette near Château-Thierry on 1 July 1918. On 19 July, he was wounded by shrapnel while leading two of his companies in an attack, for which he received the Purple Heart. After recovering, he was director of the tactical course at the II Corps School in Châtillon-sur-Seine. Elliott was promoted to temporary lieutenant colonel in September 1918. After the Armistice of November 11, 1918 ended the war, Elliott took part in the early stages of the Occupation of the Rhineland and returned to the United States in June 1919. The awards he received from France to commend his service included the Chevalier of the Legion of Honor and Croix de Guerre with palm.

=== Distinguished Service Cross citation ===
The President of the United States of America, authorized by Act of Congress, July 9, 1918, takes pleasure in presenting the Distinguished Service Cross to Major (Infantry) Charles B. Elliott, United States Army, for extraordinary heroism in action while serving with 23d Infantry Regiment, 2d Division, American Expeditionary Forces, near Chateau-Thierry, France, June 6–7, 1918. Leading his command in combat on June 6–7, Major Elliott reformed his badly shattered units in the face of unusual and annihilating fire and directed the placing of his guns throughout a severe gas attack, which severely poisoned him.

Service: United States Army Rank: Major (Infantry) Regiment: 23d Infantry Regiment Division: 2d Division, American Expeditionary Forces Action Date: June 6–7, 1918 Orders: War Department, General Orders No. 126 (1919)

=== Silver Star citation ===
Commanding the 3rd Battalion on July 1, 1918, he displayed conspicuous coolness, courage and efficiency in organizing his battalion for attack in the Bois-de-la-Mariette, exposing himself to constant bombardment and, under the most difficult circumstances, initiating and pushing to conclusion a successful attack. Under trying circumstances, he has shown throughout unusual courage, cheerfulness and fortitude.

Service: United States Army Rank: Major (Infantry) Regiment: 23d Infantry Regiment Action Date: July 1, 1918 Orders: 2d Division, General Order No. 88 (December 31, 1918)

== Later career ==
After returning to the United States, Elliott served in the office of the army's Chief of Infantry from 1919 to 1921. In March 1920, he returned to his regular rank of captain and in July he was promoted to the regular rank of major. From 1921 to 1922, he attended the School of the Line (now the United States Army Command and General Staff College) at Fort Leavenworth, Kansas. From 1922 to 1926, he was an instructor in the tactical section of the Infantry School at Fort Benning, Georgia. He served with the 29th Infantry Regiment from 1926 to 1927, then attended the United States Army War College in Washington, DC. After his 1928 graduation, he was assigned as senior instructor for the District of Columbia National Guard and the 29th Infantry Division. In November 1928, he received promotion to lieutenant colonel.

From 1931 to 1932, Elliott was a student at the Fort Meade, Maryland Tank School. From 1932 to 1934, he served as executive officer and second-in-command of the 34th Infantry Regiment. He served on the staff of the Hawaiian Department. From 1936 to 1938, he was assigned as head of Reserve Affairs and Citizens' Military Training Camps for the Fourth Corps Area. From 1938 to 1940, he commanded the 34th Infantry Regiment. In 1940, he was assigned as chief of staff for the 9th Infantry Division during its organization and training at Fort Bragg, North Carolina, and he was one of two officers who acted as the division commander prior to the assignment of Jacob L. Devers. In July 1941, he was assigned as Fort Bragg's post commander. He served in this position until retiring in June 1942.

In retirement, Elliott was a resident of Washington, DC. He died at Walter Reed Army Medical Center in Washington on 24 February 1958. Elliott was buried at Arlington National Cemetery.

== Dates of rank ==
- Private, corporal, and sergeant, 11 November 1901 to 4 October 1904
- Second lieutenant, 5 October 1904
- First lieutenant, 11 March 1911
- Captain, 1 July 1916
- Major (National Army), 5 August 1917
- Lieutenant colonel (National Army), 9 September 1918
- Captain, 15 March 1920
- Major, 1 July 1920
- Lieutenant colonel, 17 November 1928
- Colonel, 1 August 1935
- Colonel (retired), 30 June 1942
