= Aubrey Newman =

United States Army officer (1903–1994)

Aubrey S. Newman
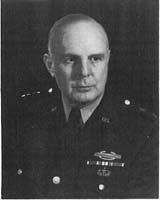
- Born: Aubrey Strode Newman; January 30, 1903; Clemson, South Carolina
- Died: January 19, 1994 (aged 90); Sarasota, Florida
- Burial place: West Point Cemetery; 41.3972° N, 73.9667° W
- Spouse: Dorothy Tyson (Lt Col)
- Military career
- Branch: Army
- Service years: 1925–1960
- Rank: Major General
- Nickname: Red
- Commands: Deputy Commanding General of the Army Infantry Center at Fort Benning; Chief of Staff of the Army Continental Command at Fort Monroe; Chief of Staff for the Iceland Defense Force; Deputy Commandant of the Armed Forces College in Norfolk
- Conflicts: World War II
- Awards: Distinguished Service Cross; Army Distinguished Service Medal; Silver Star; Legion of Merit; Purple Heart

Aubrey Strode Newman (1903–1994) was a United States Army major general with 34 years of service. During World War II, Newman commanded the 34th Infantry Regiment of the 24th Infantry Division during the Philippines Campaign. His cry of "Follow Me!" at Leyte rallied his troops and inspired American infantrymen for decades. He was awarded the Distinguished Service Cross (DSC), the nation's second-highest award for valor in combat, for extraordinary heroism during this battle.

== Biography ==
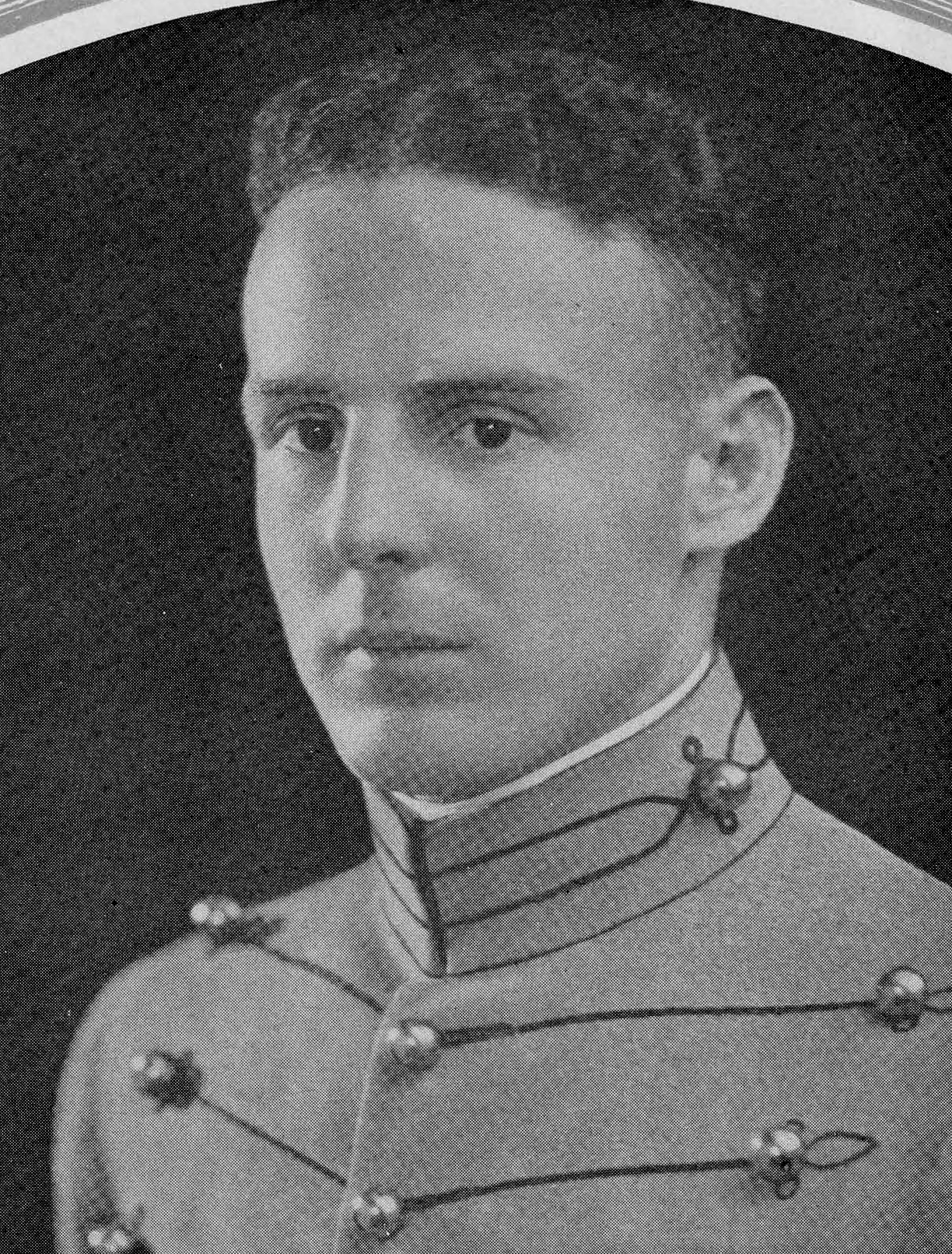
At West Point in 1925

Aubrey Newman was born in Clemson, South Carolina on January 30, 1903. He graduated from the United States Military Academy at West Point in 1925.

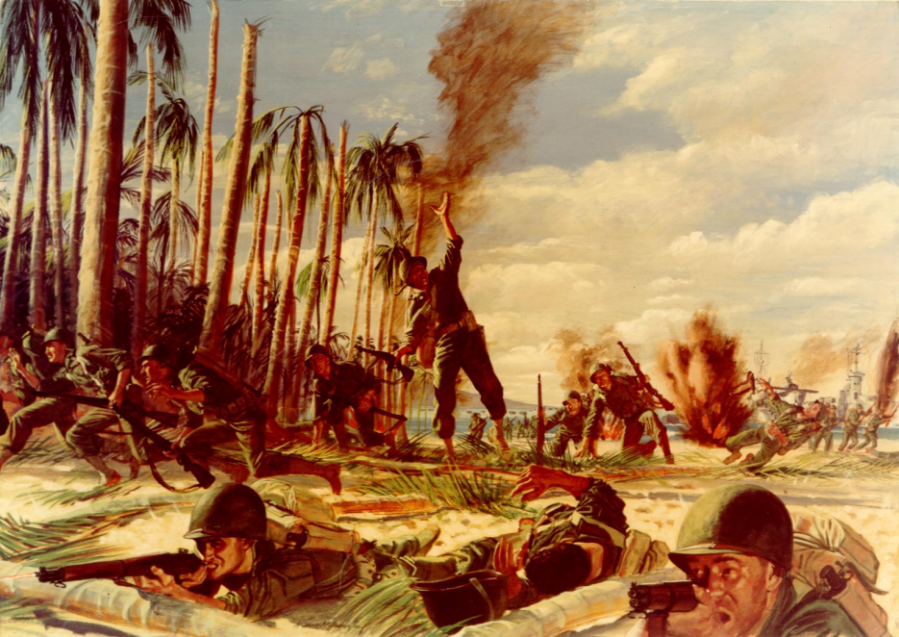
Leyte, Philippine Islands, 20 October 1944. "The American Army returned to the Philippines over the beaches of Leyte Island. Red Beach was defended by the Japanese occupying a number of large, well-camouflaged pillboxes. Immediately after their landing, the leading elements of the 3d Battalion, 34th Infantry – one of the units of the U.S. Army's 24th Division – were pinned down by heavy machine gun and rifle fire. The Regimental Commander, Colonel Aubrey S. Newman, arrived on the beach and, taking in the situation at a glance, shouted to his men: 'Get up and get moving! Follow me!'"

While a lieutenant, Newman competed in the 1928 Olympics and finished 16th in the pentathlon.

Newman was a contributor to Army Magazine for many years. His articles on common sense leadership were very popular and were later published in three books: Follow Me: The Human Element in Leadership, Follow Me II: More on the Human Element in Leadership, and Follow Me III: Lessons on the Art and Science of High Command. He also authored What Generals are Made Of.

He died in Sarasota, Florida on January 19, 1994, and was buried at West Point Cemetery.

== Legacy ==
Newman's books remain on the professional reading lists of the U.S. Army Command and General Staff College, the United States Marine Corps' Commandant, and many other military and paramilitary organizations.

The United States Army Forces Command (FORSCOM) recognizes outstanding junior leaders who demonstrate a commitment to developing their soldiers with the Major General Aubrey "Red" Newman Award.
