= Harold H. Moon Jr. =

United States Army Medal of Honor recipient

- Born: March 15, 1921; Albuquerque, New Mexico
- Died: October 21, 1944 (aged 23); Pawing, Leyte, the Philippines
- Burial place: Sunset Memorial Park, Albuquerque, New Mexico
- Military career
- Allegiance: United States
- Branch: United States Army
- Service years: 1942–1944
- Rank: Private
- Units: 34th Infantry Regiment, 24th Infantry Division
- Conflicts: World War II: Battle of Leyte
- Awards: Medal of Honor Purple Heart

Harold Herman Moon Jr. (March 15, 1921 – October 21, 1944) was a United States Army soldier and a recipient of the United States military's highest decoration—the Medal of Honor—for his actions during the Battle of Leyte in World War II.

== Biography ==
Moon joined the Army from Gardena, California in August 1942, and served as a private in Company G, 34th Infantry Regiment, 24th Infantry Division. Before the landing on Leyte, Moon was a persistent troublemaker and known as the "G Company screw-up." He had been confined to the stockade yet was released back to his unit, amidst strong objection, just before the battle. On the night of October 21, 1944, during a Japanese counterattack at Pawing, Leyte in the Philippines, Moon held his position manning a submachine gun despite intense enemy fire and overwhelming odds. He was killed during the battle and, on November 15, 1945, posthumously awarded the Medal of Honor for his actions.

Moon, aged 23 at his death, was buried at Sunset Memorial Park in his birth city of Albuquerque, New Mexico.

== Medal of Honor citation ==
Private Moon's official Medal of Honor citation reads:

He fought with conspicuous gallantry and intrepidity when powerful Japanese counterblows were being struck in a desperate effort to annihilate a newly won beachhead. In a forward position, armed with a submachinegun, he met the brunt of a strong, well-supported night attack which quickly enveloped his platoon's flanks. Many men in nearby positions were killed or injured, and Pvt. Moon was wounded as his foxhole became the immediate object of a concentration of mortar and machinegun fire. Nevertheless, he maintained his stand, poured deadly fire into the enemy, daringly exposed himself to hostile fire time after time to exhort and inspire what American troops were left in the immediate area. A Japanese officer, covered by machinegun fire and hidden by an embankment, attempted to knock out his position with grenades, but Pvt. Moon, after protracted and skillful maneuvering, killed him. When the enemy advanced a light machinegun to within 20 yards of the shattered perimeter and fired with telling effects on the remnants of the platoon, he stood up to locate the gun and remained exposed while calling back range corrections to friendly mortars which knocked out the weapon. A little later he killed 2 Japanese as they charged an aid man. By dawn his position, the focal point of the attack for more than 4 hours, was virtually surrounded. In a fanatical effort to reduce it and kill its defender, an entire platoon charged with fixed bayonets. Firing from a sitting position, Pvt. Moon calmly emptied his magazine into the advancing horde, killing 18 and repulsing the attack. In a final display of bravery, he stood up to throw a grenade at a machinegun which had opened fire on the right flank. He was hit and instantly killed, falling in the position from which he had not been driven by the fiercest enemy action. Nearly 200 dead Japanese were found within 100 yards of his foxhole. The continued tenacity, combat sagacity, and magnificent heroism with which Pvt. Moon fought on against overwhelming odds contributed in a large measure to breaking up a powerful enemy threat and did much to insure our initial successes during a most important operation.

== Awards and decorations ==

Badge	Combat Infantryman Badge		
1st row	Medal of Honor		Bronze Star Medal
2nd row	Purple Heart	Army Good Conduct Medal	American Campaign Medal
3rd row	Asiatic-Pacific Campaign Medal with Arrowhead Device and 1 Campaign star	World War II Victory Medal	Philippine Liberation Medal

== See also ==
- List of Medal of Honor recipients
