= 34th Infantry Regiment (United States) =

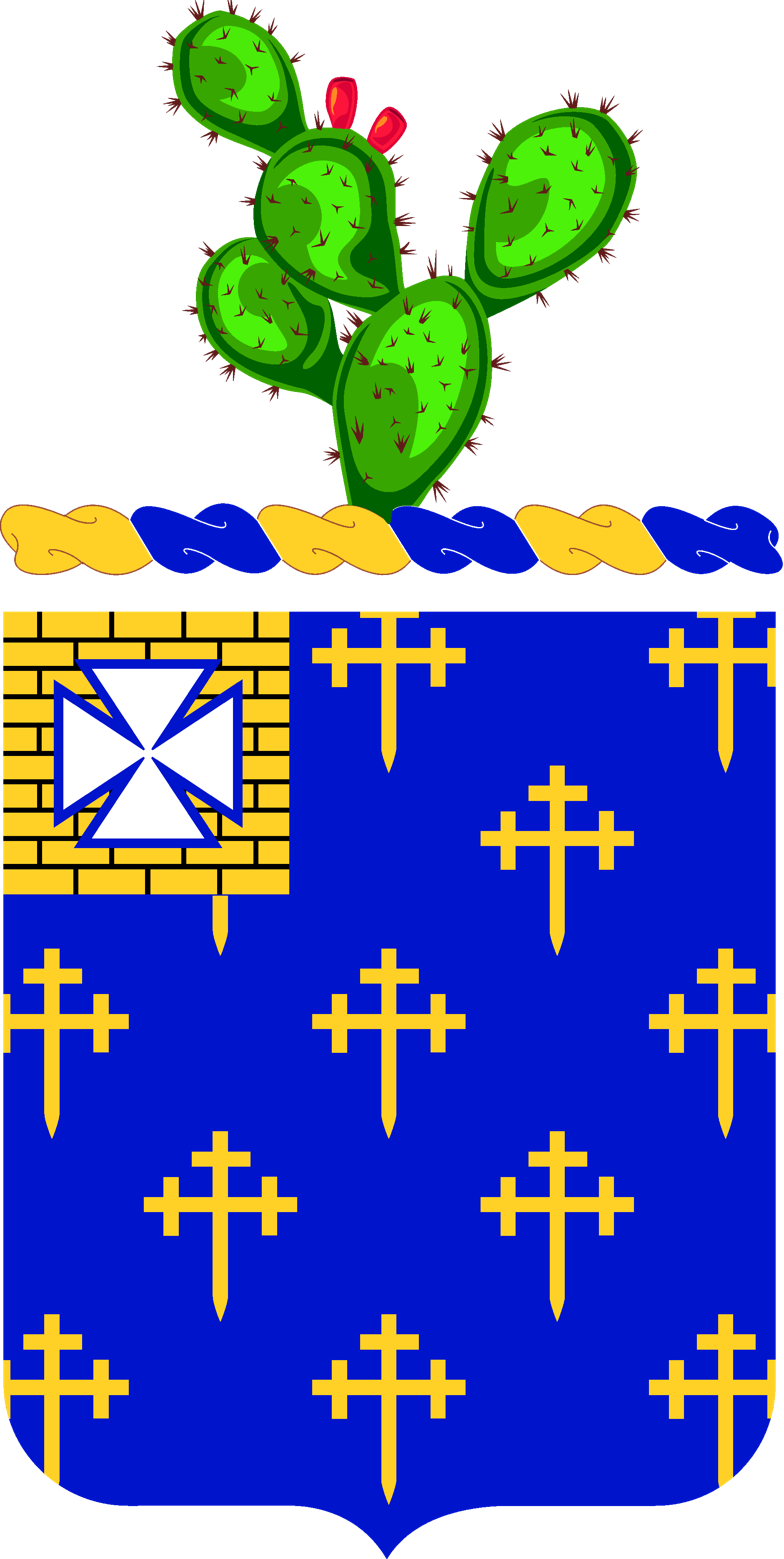
- Coat of arms
- Active: 1916–Present
- Country: United States
- Allegiance: United States
- Branch: United States Army
- Type: Infantry
- Nickname: Leyte Dragons (special designation)
- Motto: Toujours en Avant (Always Forward)
- Engagements: World War I World War II; Korean War

Commanders
- Current commander: Chanda Mofu
- Notable commanders: Charles D. Roberts; Galusha Pennypacker; Aubrey S. Newman; Charles E. Beauchamp; Charles Bernadou Elliott

Insignia
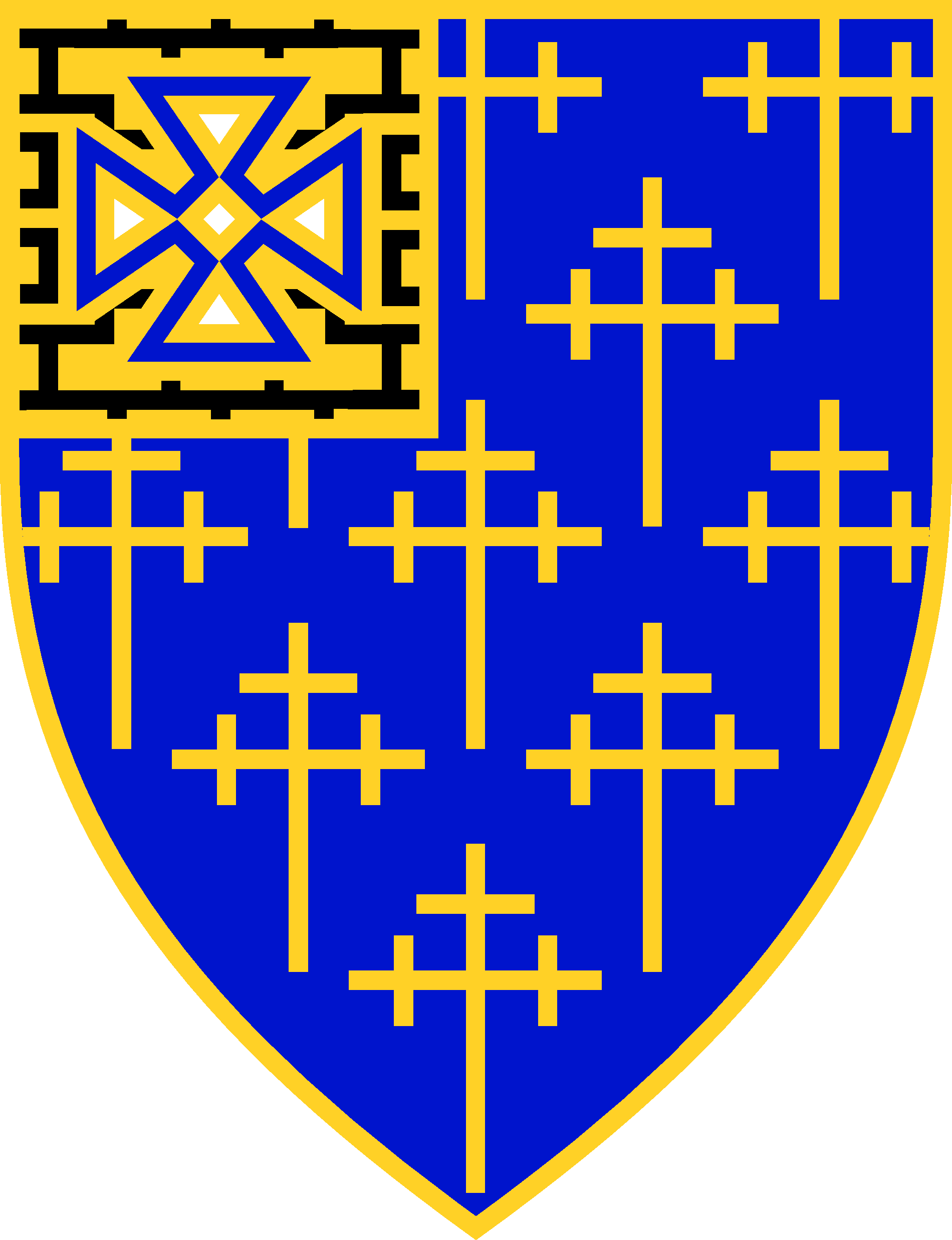
- Distinctive unit insignia

The 34th Infantry Regiment (special designation "Leyte Dragons") is a Regular Army infantry regiment of the United States Army. It saw combat in World War I, in the Pacific Theater of Operations in World War II, and was the first full American regiment deployed in combat in the Korean War. The 1st and 3rd Battalions of the 34th are now basic training formations attached to the 165th Infantry Brigade at Fort Jackson, South Carolina.

== Other units called "34th Infantry Regiment" ==
There was a 34th Infantry Regiment in the War of 1812, constituted on 29 January 1813 by enrolling several militia companies from Maine (then Massachusetts) into regular service. This regiment served under General George Izard on the Lake Champlain frontier. In October 1815 it was consolidated into the Regiment of Light Artillery.

At the outbreak of the American Civil War, Congress increased the Regular Army by authorizing the creation of nine new, three-battalion infantry regiments. After the war, the battalions of those regiments were reorganized as separate regiments. The 3rd Battalion, 16th Infantry became the 34th Infantry Regiment on 21 September 1866. In 1869 Congress reduced the peacetime army from 41 infantry regiments to 25. The 34th and 11th Regiments were consolidated on 6 April to form the current 16th Infantry Regiment.

== Origins; World War I; interwar period ==
The current 34th Infantry Regiment was organized at El Paso, Texas on 15 July 1916, four months into the Punitive Expedition into Mexico led by Major General John J. Pershing. The 34th's original cadre was drawn from the 7th, 20th and 23rd regiments. The regiment was assigned to border patrol and National Guard training duties.

With the American entry into World War I in April 1917 the Army expanded and shifted to preparation for war in Europe. The 34th was assigned to the 7th Division, which arrived in France on 27 August 1918. On 9 October the division went into line in Lorraine with the 34th on its left. It saw action in the Puvenelle sector before the armistice on 11 November. With the rest of the division, the 34th then took up occupation duty in Germany during negotiations of the Treaty of Versailles. The regiment returned to the United States in June 1919.

The 34th Infantry Regiment was transferred on 25 June 1919 to Camp Funston, Kansas, and to Camp George G. Meade, Maryland on 16 January 1921. On 16 October 1921, the regimental headquarters relocated to Madison Barracks, New York; the 1st Battalion was posted to Fort Wadsworth, New York, the 2nd Battalion at Fort Ontario, New York, and the 3rd Battalion to Fort Howard, Maryland. The entire regiment was transferred on 7 September 1922 to Camp Eustis, Virginia. The 3rd Battalion was inactivated on 27 September 1922. The 34th Infantry's intended wartime mission was to conduct a mobile defense of possible amphibious landing areas in support of the Harbor Defenses of Chesapeake Bay.

The regiment was relieved from the 7th Division on 24 March 1923 and assigned to the 8th Division. The 3rd Battalion was organized on 30 March 1926 with Organized Reserve personnel as a "Regular Army Inactive" unit, with headquarters at Fort Eustis. The regiment was relieved from the 8th Division on 15 August 1927 and assigned to the 4th Division. It was partially mechanized in July 1928 and concurrently attached to the Experimental Mechanized Force at Camp Meade; the unit became first fully motorized infantry regiment in the Army on 1 September 1929. It participated in the sesquicentennial celebration of the Battle of Yorktown, 5–27 October 1931. The regiment was transferred 4 November 1931 to Fort Meade.

On 28 July 1932, regular forces were assembled in Washington, D.C. under the direct command of the Army Chief of Staff, General Douglas MacArthur, to break up the Bonus Army, a protest group largely made up of unemployed World War I veterans seeking pensions from the Herbert Hoover administration. A battalion of the 34th was in reserve while the main action was conducted by the 3rd Cavalry and 12th Infantry.

The regiment participated in the inaugural parade for President Franklin D. Roosevelt on 4 March 1933. It was relieved from the 4th Division on 1 October 1933 and assigned to the 8th Division. The primary ROTC "feeder" school for new Reserve lieutenants was Pennsylvania State College; assigned Reserve officers of the regiment conducted summer training with the unit at Fort Meade. The regiment was transferred on 6 April 1940 to Fort Benning, Georgia, and was inactivated on 5 June 1940. It was reactivated on 1 July 1940 at Camp Jackson, South Carolina. On 15 July 1940, following maneuvers in Tennessee in which the 1st Battalion had served as a tank battalion, cadre from the 34th Infantry formed the 70th Tank Battalion, now the 70th Armor Regiment. That same month, the 34th became part of the 8th Infantry Division when that unit was activated at Fort Jackson. The 34th was designated the outstanding regiment of the Carolina Maneuvers of 1941.

In November 1941, the regiment was assigned to the Philippine Department to reinforce the islands, as the prospects of war with Japan increased, and was transferred on 3 December 1941 to the San Francisco Port of Embarkation.

== World War II ==
The 34th was awaiting embarkation on 7 December when the attack on Pearl Harbor brought the United States into the war. The regiment was reassigned to the Hawaiian Department and its convoy rerouted to Oahu, where it arrived on 21 December. The 34th was put in department reserve and assigned to the defense of the island.

On 12 June 1943 the 34th was assigned to the 24th Infantry Division, replacing the 298th Infantry, a Hawaiian National Guard unit that had been severely depleted the previous year when its ethnic Japanese soldiers were reassigned to the 100th Infantry Battalion (Separate). In September the division shipped out to Australia for training.

The 34th served as division reserve during the Operation Reckless landings at Tanahmerah Bay, Netherlands New Guinea on 22 April 1944. The regiment was brought ashore and assisted in mopping-up operations around the Hollandia airdrome.

In early June the 34th was attached to the 41st Infantry Division, whose assault on Biak Island was meeting unexpected resistance. A two-day assault by the 34th captured Sorido and Brooke airdromes, major objectives in the campaign.

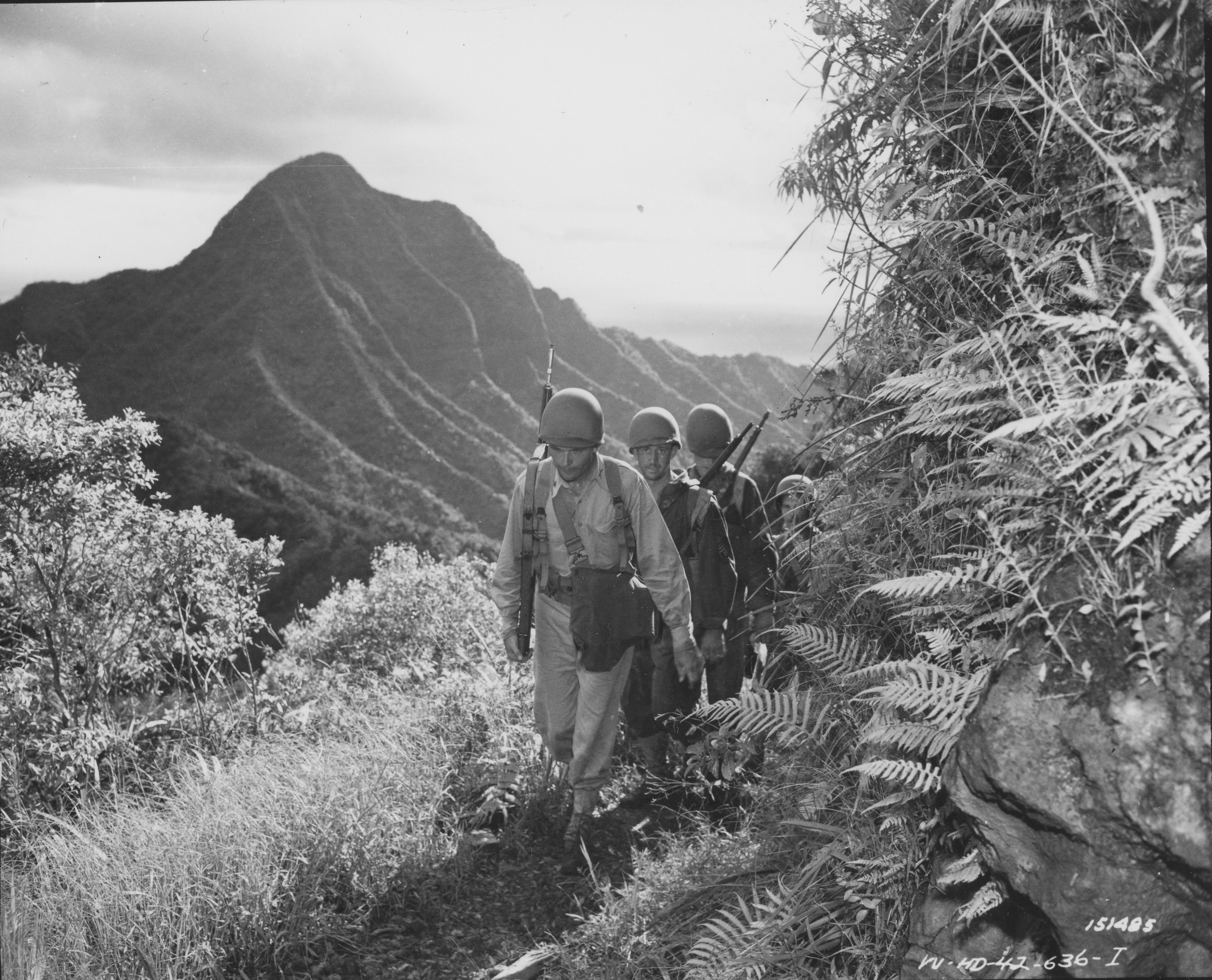
Soldiers of the 34th Infantry Regiment on maneuvers in Hawaii, 1942.

On 16 February 1945 the 3rd Battalion under Col. Aubrey S. "Red" Newman amphibiously assaulted Corregidor and assisted the 503rd Parachute Regimental Combat Team in capturing the island. The fighting lasted until 26 February.

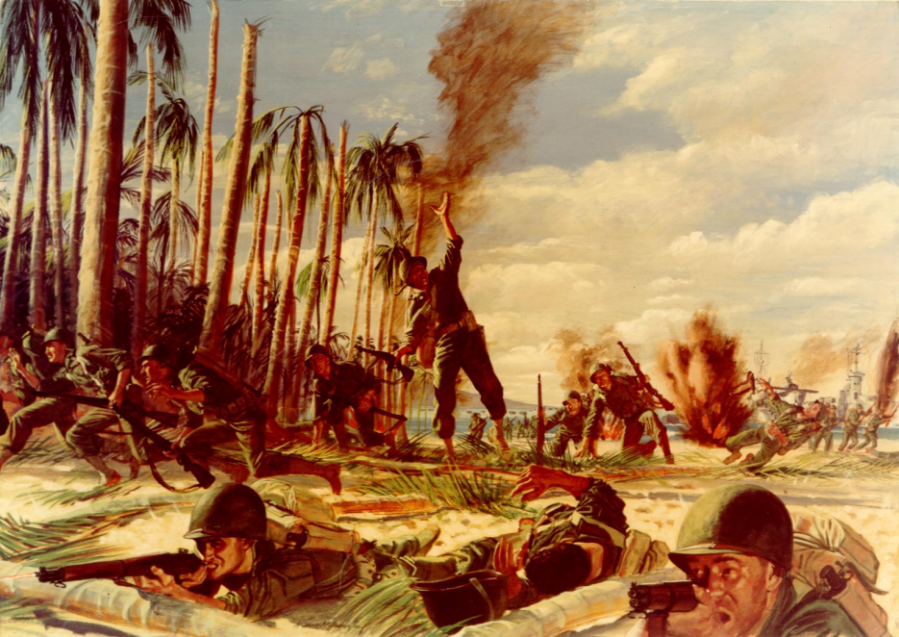
Leyte, Philippine Islands, 20 October 1944. "The American Army returned to the Philippines over the beaches of Leyte Island. Red Beach was defended by the Japanese occupying a number of large, well-camouflaged pillboxes. Immediately after their landing, the leading elements of the 3d Battalion, 34th Infantry – one of the units of the U.S. Army's 24th Division – were pinned down by heavy machine gun and rifle fire. The Regimental Commander, Colonel Aubrey S. Newman, arrived on the beach and, taking in the situation at a glance, shouted to his men: 'Get up and get moving! Follow me!'"

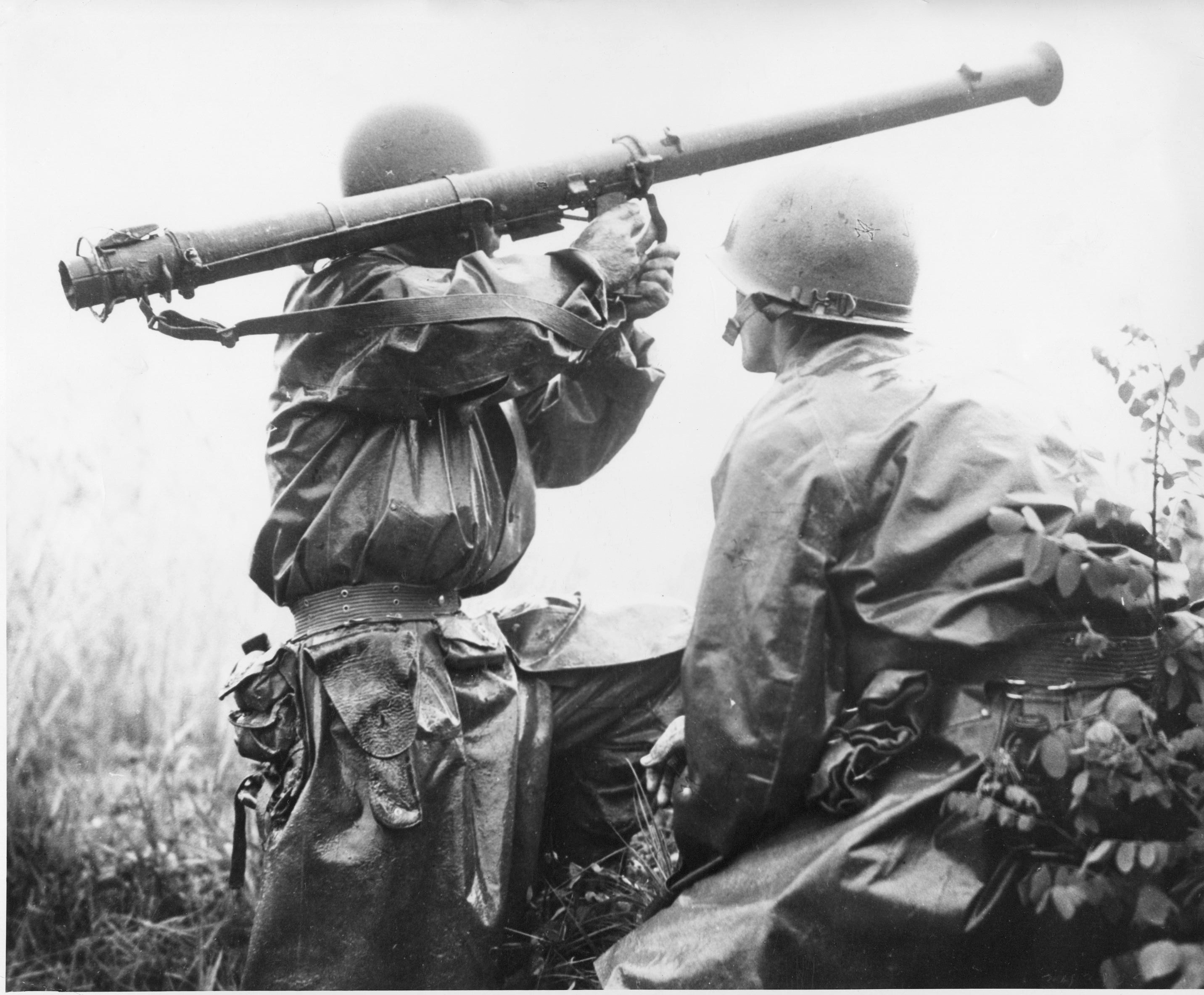
Moments before his death, Shadrick (right) looks on as another soldier fires a bazooka.

According to Stephen J. Lofgren who prepared the pamphlet, Southern Philippines in the U.S. Army's Center of Military History series The US Army Campaigns of WWII, "The Southern Philippines Campaign usually is given short shrift in popular histories of World War II." The campaign, which the U.S. Army recognizes as ending on 4 July 1945, actually lasted until Imperial Japanese forces received the news of the Japanese total defeat from Tokyo in September. Operation VICTOR V of the Southern Philippines Campaign was waged with primary objective of eradicating Japanese military power on Mindanao in the Philippine Islands and liberating the Filipino people.

The 34th Infantry, operating as an element of the 24th Infantry Division, participated in some of the most horrific combat under the most insufferable weather and terrain conditions of the War in the Pacific. Yet for the entire campaign U.S. forces losses were minimal. The mopping up activities on the island of Mindanao lasting into September 1945 would result in 22,000 Japanese soldiers emerging from the central Mindanao jungles to surrender. More than 10,000 Japanese died in combat on Mindanao, while 8,000 or more died from starvation or disease during the campaign. From 17 April to 15 August 1945, 820 U.S. soldiers were killed in eastern Mindanao and 2,880 were wounded; many more deaths and injuries were after 15 August. The 34th Infantry would go on to occupy the southern Japanese island of Kyushu.

Three 34th Infantry soldiers received the Medal of Honor for service in World War II, all posthumously:

- Captain Francis B. Wai, Leyte, 20 October 1944
- Private Harold H. Moon, Jr., Leyte, 21 October 1944
- Sergeant Charles E. Mower, Capoacan, Leyte, 3 November 1944

== Korean War ==
The first American ground casualty of the Korean War was widely speculated at the time to have been Private Kenneth R. Shadrick of the 34th Infantry Regiment, 24th Infantry Division, who was killed in action on 5 July 1950, three miles south of Osan, Republic of Korea, during the Battle of Osan. Subsequent publications have shed doubt on the accuracy of the claims of Shadrick's distinction; eyewitness accounts at the battle point to the first death actually being a machine gunner in the 21st Infantry Regiment, who had been killed at around 08:30, eight hours before Shadrick's death.

== Campaign credits ==
World War I

- Lorraine

World War II

- New Guinea
- Leyte (with arrowhead)
- Luzon
- Southern Philippines

Korean War

- United Nations Defensive
- United Nations Summer-Fall Offensive
- Korea Summer-Fall 1953

== Decorations ==
- Presidential Unit Citation (Army) for KILAY RIDGE
- Presidential Unit Citation (Army) for CORREGIDOR
- Presidential Unit Citation (Army) for DEFENSE OF KOREA
- Philippine Republic Presidential Unit Citation for 17 OCTOBER 1944 TO 4 JULY 1945
- Republic of Korea Presidential Unit Citation for PYONGTAEK
- Republic of Korea Presidential Unit Citation for KOREA

== In popular culture ==
The experience of the 2nd Battalion at the National Training Centre (NTC) in 1982, and the general NTC training experience, are discussed in great detail, but in a very readable fashion, in Daniel P. Bolger's "Dragons at War."

== See also ==
- Aubrey Newman
- Battle of Corregidor (1945)
- Battle of Leyte
- Battle of Pusan Perimeter
- William F. Dean
