= 238th Cavalry Regiment =

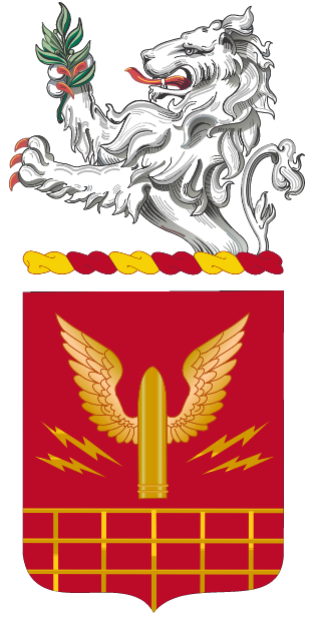
- Coat of Arms of the 238th Cavalry Regiment
- Active: 1949–2009
- Country: United States
- Branch: United States Army
- Type: Reconnaissance (Parent regiment under United States Army Regimental System)
- Part of: 76th Infantry Brigade (Troop E) (1995–2009)
- Garrison/HQ: Bluffton (1994–2009)
- Motto: "Deo Favente" (With God's Favor)

Insignia
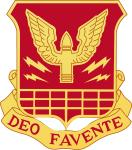
- Distinctive Unit Insignia

The 238th Cavalry Regiment was a United States Army parent cavalry regiment, represented in the Indiana Army National Guard by Troop E, 238th Cavalry, part of the 76th Infantry Brigade Combat Team, stationed at Bluffton.

It carried out reconnaissance missions to support the 76th Brigade Combat Team. The troop regimental crest displayed the motto of the 238th Cavalty, "Deo Favente" which translates into "With God's Favor." Its call sign was "Saber." It had three platoons. "Cobra," "Shadow," and "Deathdealer" were unofficially the 1st, 2nd, and 3rd platoons respectively.

== History ==
The 238th was originally constituted on 31 January 1949 in the Indiana National Guard as the 138th Antiaircraft Artillery Automatic Weapons Battalion, part of the 38th Infantry Division. It was organized and Federally recognized on 7 March 1949 with headquarters at Marion, under the command of Major Glen W. Overman. The unit dropped the Automatic Weapons designation on 1 October 1953. It was converted and redesignated as the 2nd Reconnaissance Squadron of the 138th Armor on 1 February 1959, still part of the 38th Infantry Division.

On 1 March 1963, the squadron was redesignated as the 238th Cavalry, a parent regiment under the Combat Arms Regimental System. It consisted of the 1st Squadron, part of the 38th Division, organized by redesignation mainly from units of the 2nd Reconnaissance Squadron. The 1st Squadron's headquarters and headquarters troop (HHT) was redesignated from the 2nd Reconnaissance Squadron HHT at Marion, Troop A from the 2nd Reconnaissance Squadron's Troop A at Hartford City, Troop B from Troop C of the 2nd Reconnaissance Squadron at Bluffton, Troop C from Detachment 1 of Company A of the 293rd Infantry Regiment's 1st Battle Group at Huntington, Detachment 1 of Troop C from Company A of the 293rd's 1st Battle Group at Wabash, and Troop D (Air) from Detachment 1 of the Combat Support Company of the 293rd's 2nd Battle Group at Peru.

On 1 November 1965, Troop A was redesignated as Detachment 1 of the 2149th Transportation Company. On 1 December 1967, Troop C became the 2149th Transportation Company and Troop D (Air) became Detachment 1 of Company C of the 293rd's 2nd Battalion. On 1 February 1968, Troop B of the 1st Squadron of the 146th Cavalry at Detroit was redesignated Troop C. On 15 February, Troop A was redesignated from Troop B of the 1st Squadron of the 237th Cavalry at Cincinnati and Troop D (Air) from the Headquarters and Headquarters Company of the 137th Aviation Battalion at Columbus, Ohio.

On 1 March 1977, the regiment was reorganized in the Indiana National Guard to include the 1st Squadron, part of the 38th Division. On 1 June 1989, it was withdrawn from the Combat Arms Regimental System and reorganized under the United States Army Regimental System with headquarters at Marion. On 16 April 1995, the regiment was reorganized to consist of Troop E, part of the 76th Infantry Brigade. On 23 January 2002, the troop was ordered into active Federal service at Bluffton. E Troop deployed to Bosnia as part of Operation Joint Forge with Task Force 1–151 Infantry. It conducted anti-smuggling operations along the Sava as part of Task Force Warhawk, among other duties. After returning to Fort Dix on 15 September, it was released from active Federal service and reverted to state control on 17 November 2002. Personnel from Echo Troop were part of Operation Vigilant Relief to aid the victims of Hurricane Katrina in Louisiana and Mississippi, carrying out security missions with the 1/293 Infantry. On 1 October 2005, the 238th Cavalry was redesignated as the 238th Cavalry Regiment. It was relieved from the 76th Infantry Brigade on 1 September 2007, and on 1 January 2009 consolidated with the 152nd Cavalry Regiment.
