= 150th Field Artillery Regiment =

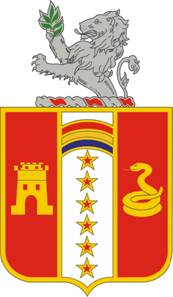
- Distinctive unit insignia
- Country: United States
- Branch: Indiana Army National Guard
- Nickname: The Raiders (special designation)
- Mottos: "Fide et Virtute" (With Faith and Valour)
- Engagements: Spanish–American War; World War I World War II; Operation Iraqi Freedom
- Website: http://in.ng.mil

The 150th Field Artillery Regiment ("The Raiders") is a field artillery unit in the Indiana Army National Guard.

== History ==
The 150th Field Artillery was formed from the 1st Indiana Field Artillery, which served during the Spanish–American War. The Indiana Field Artillery was at service on the Mexican border when the United States declared war on Germany in 1917. As the United States mobilized for World War I, the Indiana Field Artillery became federalized as the 150th Field Artillery, and assigned to the 42nd Infantry "Rainbow" Division, which participated in several major battles in 1918. Major Robert Tyndall was promoted to Colonel in command of the entire regiment, which was issued French 155 millimeter cannons.

During World War II, the 150th Field Artillery served with the 38th Infantry Division.

During the Iraq War, the 150th Field Artillery sent teams to train Iraqi police. In 2006 HHB 2-150 FA sent 152 Artillerymen to Mosul, Iraq to train Iraqi Policemen. Their success brought distinction by Award of the Meritorious Unit Commendation.

In 2007 2 batteries of 2-150 FA and 3-139 FA (organized under 2-150 FA) served as convoy security companies in 76th Infantry Brigade Combat Team. In 2009–10 officers and Soldiers of 2-150 formed the 2-150 Fires Team, serving on the staffs of 34th Infantry Division (MNARNG) and 17th Fires Brigade (AD), Ft. Lewis, WA in Multi-National Division – South and Basra Province respectively.

During Operation Enduring Freedom Soldiers of 2-150 served on Embedded Training Teams with the Afghan National Army for the 76IBCT (INARNG) throughout Afghanistan. In 2012–13, E TAB "Watchdogs," 139 Field Artillery, assigned to 2-150 FA conducted counter-fire and force protection missions throughout Regional Command Assistant Group – South in support of various Active Duty, Guard, Reserve and State Department missions.

=== Civil War ===
The 18th Indiana Battery of Light Artillery (Lilly's Brigade) was organized at Indianapolis and mustered into service on 14 August 1862, with Captain Eli Lilly in command.

The 18th Indiana Battery, Light Artillery participated in the following Civil War Campaigns:

- 1862 – Kentucky.
- 1863 – Roscrans' Campaign in Tennessee.
- 1863–1864 – East Tennessee.
- 1864 – Atlanta.
- 1864 – Pursuit of Hood.
- 1864–1865 – Wilson's Raid through Alabama and Georgia.
- 1865 – Tennessee.

The company initially served at various posts at Cincinnati and throughout Kentucky. In June 1863, the 18th was assigned to the Wilder's Mounted Brigade. It participated in Rosecrans' East Tennessee Campaign in the succeeding months. During the battle of Hoover's Gap, Tennessee, the Confederate forces were well positioned, but Wilder's Brigade attacked and pushed the Confederate forces through the Gap. With effective fire, Lilly's Battery drove the Confederates from the field. The effective aim and deadly fire of the 18th Battery was also experienced by the charging rebel columns of General Longstreet's Corps during the battle of Chickamauga, on 19 September 1863. Beginning in May 1864, Lilly's Battery marched with General Sherman's army on the campaign against Atlanta, during which it participated in numerous engagements, including Resaca, Cassville, Stilesboro, and Lost Mountain. Later, it was among the Union forces that pursued General Hood's troops after the Confederate defeat at Chattanooga.

=== Later 19th century ===
22 Nov. 1882, the First Regiment Light Artillery was organized from the original Indiana Legion, with Col. Eli Lilly as the Chief of Artillery.

In 1895 the name Indiana Legion was changed to the Indiana National Guard.

Units of the 1st Battalion of Indiana Light Artillery Battalion were redesignated the 27th and 28th Light Batteries, which served during the Spanish–American War.

=== The Mexican Expedition and the First World War ===
During the Mexican Border Campaign, the First Artillery Battalion of the Indiana National Guard served under Maj. Robert H. Tyndall's command.

While in training at Ft. Harrison, the First Indiana Field Artillery was designated as the 150th Field Artillery Regiment with assignments to the 42nd Rainbow Division, with 155 mm Howitzers, horse drawn. The 150th Regiment's engagements are represented by the six streamers on the regimental standard and the six stars on the regimental coat of arms. Col. Robert H. Tyndall was the World War I commander, 1917–1919.

=== Inter-war period ===
Post-WWI: The artillery in Indiana reorganized as the 1st Field Artillery Regiment in 1921. it was re-designated as the 181st Field Artillery. Because it was made up mostly of the 150th Field Artillery that had served during World War I, it was re-designated as the 150th Field Artillery in February 1922.

During peacetime, the annual training was mostly conducted at Camp Knox, KY and Camp McCoy, WI. Some units called on for various state services, such as railroad strikes, storm damages, mine strikes, etc. All units had become truck drawn by 1936.

The 150th Artillery served during the flood of 1937, as did all of the Indiana Guard. The Second Army maneuvers were held in Wisconsin, in 1940. In January 1941 the 150th was inducted.

=== World War II ===
In 1942, redesignated as the 150th Field Artillery Battalion, it served through the war with the 38th Infantry Division. (The 2nd Bn of the 150th was redesignated 208th Field Artillery, later redesignated 989th Field Artillery Battalion, and inactivated February 1946.) Training started at Camp Shelby, Mississippi, the same camp where the division trained during World War I, and suffered the severe storm damage that gave them the name Cyclone Division.

1943 - continued training in Camp.

January 1944 - left New Orleans; arrived in Hawaii for jungle training.

July 1944 - went to New Guinea for amphibious training. The 150th Field Artillery was engaged at Bataan, Zigzag Pass, Corregidor, Manila Bay, Wah Wah Dam of the Pacific theatre campaign. This brought the division the title of the "Avengers of Bataan."

=== Late 20th century in Indiana ===
The artillery returned to the States in 1947. Reorganized as the 150th Field Artillery Battalion, medium, with 155 mm Howitzers, towed, headquarters at Kokomo. Indiana had three light battalions, 105 mm towed; the 139th FA BN with headquarters at Crawfordsville, the 163rd with headquarters at Evansville and the 524th with headquarters at Bloomington.

Reorganization in 1959 had the 150th Field Artillery Battalion redesignated as the 1st Battalion 150th Field Artillery. The 524th Field Artillery Battalion was inactivated and redesignated as the 2nd Battalion 150th Field Artillery, with headquarters in Bloomington.

March 1977 brought further realignment. The 1st Battalion 150th Field Artillery was reassigned into other units. Since 1977, the 2nd Battalion 150th Field Artillery is the only unit carrying the 150th regimental designation.

In 1987, Headquarters and service batteries are at Bloomington, with "A" Battery at Greencastle, "B" Battery at Spencer, "C" Battery at Noblesville with 155 mm towed, and "D" Battery at Lebanon with 8" towed.

The 2- 150th reorganized again in 1996, becoming an Echelon above Division unit. "D" Battery was inactivated leaving HHSB in Bloomington, "A" Battery in Danville/Greencastle, "B" Battery in Spencer/ Bloomington, and "C" Battery in Lebanon/ Noblesville, all 155 mm towed Howitzer batteries.

Current Battery Locations:

HHB- Bloomington A- Greencastle B- Rockville C- Lebanon Two Units under Command and Control of 2-150 FA E (TA) 139th FA- Indianapolis 139th FSC- Crawfordsville

Lineage:

1882: 110 years ago, on 22 Nov. 1882, the First Regiment Indiana Light Artillery was organized from the original Indiana Legion, with Col. Eli Lilly as the Chief of Artillery.

1895: In 1895 the name Indiana Legion was changed to the Indiana National Guard.

1898: Units of the 1st Battalion of Indiana Light Artillery Battalion were redesignated as the 27th and 28th Light Batteries, which served during the Spanish–American War.

1916: During the Mexican Border Campaign, the First Artillery Battalion of the Indiana National Guard served with Maj. Robert H. Tyndall commanding.

1917: While in training at Ft. Harrison, the First Indiana Field Artillery was designated as the 150th Field Artillery Regiment with assignment to the 42nd Rainbow Division, with 155 mm Howitzers, horse drawn. The 150th Regiment's engagements are represented by the six streamers on the regimental standard and the six stars on the regimental coat of arms. Col. Robert H. Tyndall was the World War I commander, 1917–19.

1921–1922: The artillery in Indiana was reorganized as the 1st Field Artillery Regiment, in 1921. In Jun.1921, it was redesignated as the 181st Field Artillery Because it was made up mostly of the 150th Field Artillery that had served during World War 1, it was redesignated as the 150th Field Artillery in Feb. 1922.

1936–1942: During peacetime, the annual training was mostly at Camp Knox, Ky. and Camp McCoy, Wisc. Some units were called on for various state services, such as railroad strikes, storm damages, mine strikes, etc. All units had become truck drawn by 1936. The 150th Artillery served during the flood of 1937 (as did all of the Indiana Guard). The Second Army maneuvers were held in Wisconsin, in 1940. In Jan. 1941 the 150th was inducted. In 1942, redesignated as the 150th Field Artillery Battalion, it served through the war with the 38th Infantry Division. (The 2nd Bn of the 150th was redesignated 208th Field Artillery, later redesignated 989th Field Artillery Battalion, and inactivated Feb. 1946.) Training started at Camp Shelby, Mississippi, the same camp where the division trained during World War I, and suffered the severe storm damage which gave them the name of Cyclone Division.

1943: Training continued in Camp Carrabelle, Florida and Camp Livingston, Louisiana.

1944–1947: Leaving New Orleans in Jan. 1944, they arrived in Hawaii for jungle training. In Jul. 1944 to New Guinea for amphibious training. The 150th Artillery was engaged at Bataan, Zigzag Pass, Corregidor, Manila Bay, Wah Wah Dam of the Pacific theatre campaign. This brought the division the title of the "Avengers of Bataan." The artillery returned to the states. Reorganized in 1947 as the 150th Field Artillery Battalion, medium, with 155 mm Howitzers, towed, headquarters at Kokomo. The three light battalions, 105 mm towed, were the 130th with headquarters at Crawfordsville, the 163rd with headquarters at Evansville and the 524th with headquarters at Bloomington.

1959: Reorganization in 1959 had the 150th Field Artillery Battalion redesignated as the 1st Battalion 150th Field Artillery The 524th Field Artillery Battalion was inactivated and redesignated as the 2nd Battalion 150th Field Artillery with headquarters at Bloomington.

1977: March 1977 brought further realignment which saw the 1st Bn 150th Field Artillery being reassigned into other units. Since 1977, the 2nd Battalion 150th Field Artillery is the only unit carrying the 150th regimental designation.

1987: Headquarters and service batteries are at Bloomington, with "A" Battery at Greencastle, "B" Battery at Spencer, "C" Battery at Noblesville with 155 mm towed, and "D" Battery at Lebanon with 8 towed.

There have been many changes and improvements in equipment and training in the artillery. It has gone from solid wheels to pneumatic tires, from horses to trucks, from chain measure to lasers, from compass and protractor to computerized fire control and new powders, fuzes and even rations. A11 the changes would make volumes. The artilleryman's training and education must keep up with these changes. The "King of Battle," the artillery, as it is seen in the 150th Regiment, has much history and tradition. We trust you will have pride in being a part of the Long Red Line of the artillery.

150th Field Artillery Regiment Jack P. Money (Hon. Co1.) Col. F.A. Ret. Tad Wilson (Hon. Adjutant) Cpt. F.A. Ret. Jack Shiflet (Hon. CSM) M/Sgt. F.A. Ret. Bernard K. Bucklew, Historian Maj. F.A. Ret.

Updated:

2000: HHSB Det1 Sarajevo, BiH 2003-2005: Operation Noble Eagle, CAJMTC and Newport Chemical Facility 2005-2006: Operation Iraqi Freedom, Raider Battery 2009-2010: OIF, 2-150 FEC

Let's not forget the various slices:

2004-2005 Operation Enduring Freedom, Afghanistan Various individuals from 2-150 in support of 76th Bde Embedded Training Teams. 2004-2005 OIF, Target Acquisition Battery 2008-2009 OIF, Two Batteries in support of 76th Bde 2009-2010 OEF, Various individuals in support of 1-219th AG Team 2002-2010 Many single soldiers in support of nearly every deployment from INARNG

== Lineage ==
- Organized 22 November 1882 in the Indiana Legion from existing batteries as the 1st Regiment, Indiana Light Artillery.
- Reorganized and redesignated 18 July 1889 as the 1st Battalion, Light Artillery.

(Indiana Legion redesignated 5 March 1895 as the Indiana National Guard.)
(Battery A [Indianapolis] and Battery E [Fort Wayne] mustered into Federal service 10 and 12 May 1898 as the 27th and 28th Light Batteries, respectively; mustered out of Federal service 25 November and 21 November 1898, respectively, at Indianapolis.)

- Reorganized 20 July 1900 in the Indiana National Guard as the Artillery Battalion.
- Mustered into Federal service 28–30 June 1916; mustered out of Federal service 19 January 1917 at Fort Benjamin Harrison, Indiana.
- Mustered into Federal service 2–3 July 1917.
- Expanded, reorganized, and redesignated 4 August 1917 as the 1st Field Artillery.
- Drafted into Federal service 5 August 1917.
- Reorganized and redesignated 14 August 1917 as the 150th Field Artillery and assigned to the 42d Division.
- Demobilized 9 May 1919 at Camp Zachary Taylor, Kentucky.
- Reorganized in 1921 in the Indiana National Guard as the 1st Field artillery.
- Redesignated 30 June 1921 as the 181st Field Artillery with headquarters at Kokomo.
- Redesignated 27 February 1922 as the 150th Field artillery.
- Assigned 16 March 1923 to the 38th division.

(location of headquarters changed 16 March 1936 to Indianapolis.)

- Inducted into Federal service 17 January 1941 at home stations.
- Regiment broken up 1 March 1942 and its elements reorganized and redesignated as follows:

- Headquarters disbanded
- Headquarters Battery as Headquarters and Service Company, 131st Engineer Regiment, and relieved from assignment to the 38th Division
- 1st Battalion as the 150th Field Artillery Battalion, an element of the 38th Infantry Division
- 2d Battalion as the 2d Battalion, 208th Field artillery, and relieved from assignment to the 38th division.
- Headquarters and Service Company, 131st Engineer Regiment, reorganized and redesignated 15 May 1944 as Headquarters Company, 1129th Engineer Combat Group. Inactivated 28 February 1946 in Japan. Consolidated 24 June 1946 with Headquarters, 150th Field Artillery (reconstituted 25 August 1945 in the Indiana National Guard) and the 150th Field artillery Battalion (inactivated 1 November 1945 at Los Angeles, California) and consolidated unit designated as the 150th Field Artillery Battalion. Reorganized and Federally recognized 2 May 1947 with headquarters at Kokomo.
- 2d Battalion, 208th Field Artillery, reorganized and redesignated 1 March 1943 as the 989th Field artillery Battalion. Inactivated 17 February 1946 at Camp Kilmer, New Jersey. Redesignated 24 June 1946 as the 524th Field Artillery Battalion and assigned to the 38th Infantry Division. Reorganized and Federally recognized 28 July 1947 with headquarters at Bloomington.

- 150th and 524th Field Artillery Battalions consolidated 1 February 1959 to form the 150th Artillery, a parent regiment under the Combat Arms Regimental System, to consist of the 1st and 2d Howitzer Battalions, elements of the 38th Infantry Division.
- Reorganized 1 March 1963 to consist of the 1st and 2d Battalions, elements of the 38th Infantry Division.
- Redesignated 1 February 1972 as the 150th Field Artillery.
- Reorganized 1 March 1977 to consist of the 2d Battalion, an element of the 38th infantry division.
- Withdrawn 1 November 1986 from the Combat Arms Regimental System and reorganized under the United States Army Regimental System.
- Reorganized 1 September 1996 to consist of the 2d Battalion.

=== Campaign participation credit ===
- World War I: Champagne-Marne; Aisne-Marne; St. Mihiel; Meuse-Argonne; Lorraine 1918; Champagne 1918
- World War II: Normandy; Northern France; Rhineland; Ardennes-Alsace; Central Europe; New Guinea; Leyte; Luzon

=== Decorations ===
- Philippine Presidential Unit Citation, Streamer embroidered 17 OCTOBER 1944 TO 4 JULY 1945

== Distinctive unit insignia ==
- Description: A gold color metal and enamel device 1 1/8 inches (2.9 cm) consisting of the shield and crest of the coat of arms.
- Symbolism: The shield is red for Artillery. The castle represents service during the Spanish–American War; the coiled snake, service on the Mexican Border; the six mullets, the six major engagements and the rainbow the division in which the 150 Field Artillery served in World War I.
- Background: The distinctive unit insignia was originally approved for the 150th Field Artillery Regiment on 23 July 1927. It was amended to add the crest on 5 June 1936. It was re-designated for the 150th Field Artillery Battalion on 19 September 1942. The insignia was re-designated to the 150th Artillery Regiment on 14 June 1960. It was re-designated to the 150th Field Artillery Regiment on 28 August 1972.

== Coat of arms ==
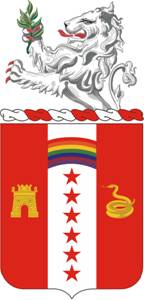
150th Field Artillery Regiment Coat of Arms

- Blazon
  - Shield: Gules on a pale Argent six mullets of the field below a fess archy enhanced in the colors of the rainbow, between in fess a castle and a rattlesnake coiled to strike both Or.
  - Crest: That for the regiments and separate battalions of the Indiana Army National Guard: On a wreath of the colors Argent and Gules, a demi-lion rampant Argent, holding in dexter paw a laurel branch Vert.
  - Motto: FIDE ET VIRTUTE (With Faith And Valour).
- Symbolism
  - Shield: The shield is red for Artillery. The castle represents service during the Spanish–American War; the coiled snake, service on the Mexican Border; the six mullets, the six major engagements and the rainbow the division in which the 150 Field Artillery saw service during World War I.
  - Crest: The crest is that of the Indiana Army National Guard.
- Background: The coat of arms was originally approved for the 150th Field Artillery Regiment on 23 July 1927. It was redesignated for the 150th Field Artillery Battalion on 19 November 1942. The insignia was redesignated for the 150th Artillery Regiment on 14 June 1960. It was redesignated for the 150th Field Artillery Regiment on 28 August 1972.
