= Battle of Bataan (1945) =

Filipino-American recapture of Bataan from Japan

Battle for the Recapture of Bataan
- Part of the Philippines campaign of World War II
- Angels of bataan bronze stars
| Date | 31 January – 21 February 1945 |
| Location | Bataan Peninsula, Philippines |
| Result | Allied victory |

Belligerents
| United States: Commonwealth of the Philippines | Japan: Second Philippine Republic |

Commanders and leaders
| (United States) Charles P. Hall (United States) Henry L.C. Jones (United States) Aubrey S. Newman | (Empire of Japan) Rikichi Tsukada (Empire of Japan) Nagayoshi Sanenobu |

Strength
| 35,000 US troops, Filipino guerillas | 2,800 Japanese troops |

Casualties and losses
| 338 killed 688 wounded | 2,400 killed 75 wounded 25 prisoners |

The Battle for the Recapture of Bataan (Filipino: Labanan para sa Bataan) from 31 January to 21 February 1945, by US forces and Allied Filipino guerrillas from the Japanese, part of the campaign for the liberation of the Philippines, was waged to secure the western shore of Manila Bay to enable the use of its harbor and open new supply lines for American troops engaged in the crucial battle for the liberation of Manila.

The Bataan peninsula's recapture also avenged the surrender of the US Army Luzon Force to invading Japanese forces on 9 April 1942.

== Background ==
The rapid advance of US forces heading towards Manila had strained the capability of their supply lines at Lingayen Gulf almost to the breaking point.

While the capture of Manila was significant for both military and psychological reasons, the seizure of Manila Bay was crucial from a logistical point of view. Its harbor was in American hands but would remain unused until the Bataan peninsula and the island of Corregidor in the west was secured.

General Douglas MacArthur bestowed on Lieutenant General Walter Krueger's Sixth Army, the task to seize Bataan, and later Corregidor. The US XI Corps, fresh from the Leyte Campaign, under Major General Charles P. Hall, augmented Sixth Army. Comprising the 38th Infantry Division commanded by Maj. Gen. Henry L.C. Jones and Colonel Aubrey "Red" S. Newman's 34th Infantry, 24th Infantry Division, the XI Corps was to land on the Zambales coast some twenty-five miles (40 km) northwest of Bataan, drive rapidly east across the base of the peninsula, and then sweep south, clearing Bataan, including its eastern coast.

But American intelligence had badly overestimated the enemy strength on Bataan, thinking that the Japanese had a full division on the peninsula. Meanwhile, Lt. Gen. Tomoyuki Yamashita, the commander of Japanese forces in the Philippines, had decided that defending Manila Bay was well beyond the capabilities of his forces, thus only some 4,000 Japanese troops of Maj. Gen. Rikichi Tsukada's Kembu Group, which had been dispersed to now captured Mindoro, Corregidor and Southern Luzon were left to oppose the Americans. The principal unit was the Nagayoshi Detachment under Col. Nagayoshi Sanonebu.

=== March to the peninsula ===
On 29 January 1945, the 38th Division landed in the San Narciso area of the southern province of Zambales, Luzon, without opposition. They promptly dashed to the San Marcelino airstrip but found out that Filipino guerrillas under the command of Captain Ramon Magsaysay (later president of the Republic of the Philippines) had already secured the field three days earlier. The port facilities at Olongapo were captured by the 34th Regiment Combat Team (RCT) on 30 January as well as Grande Island in Subic Bay after an amphibious landing. Elsewhere, surprise was complete, there was only one US casualty, an enlisted man, who was gored by an angry bull. By the end of January, Zambales province was liberated.

The 38th Division's 151st Infantry Regiment secured the entrance to Subic Bay from the south and was ordered into XI Corps reserve. Meanwhile, the 152nd Infantry Regiment was given the mission to pass through positions held by the 34th and drive eastward along an irregular and unimproved Route 7 about twenty miles (32 km) to Dinalupihan while the 149th Infantry Regiment was ordered to move eastward, north of and parallel to the 152nd, link up with XIV Corps, then turn south and west along Route 7 to meet up with the 152nd. Maj. Gen. Hall of XI Corps believed that Route 7 could be taken in less than a week.

== Battle ==
=== Struggle on 'Zig-Zag Pass' ===
Nagayoshi had decided to make a stand in the rugged Zambales mountains at the northern base of the Bataan peninsula, which the Americans named 'Zig-Zag Pass'. Abundance in supplies and ammunition had him prepared for a long battle, but his main defensive lines were stretched thin, at 2,000 yards, which left his position vulnerable to flanking maneuvers. Nonetheless, Nagayoshi and his 39th Infantry Regiment intended to hold out indefinitely. 'Zig-Zag Pass' was described thus:

few pieces of ground combined to the same degree to roughness and dense jungle. The main road, Route 7 twists violently through the pass, following a line of least terrain resistance that wild pigs must originally have established. The jungle flora in the region is so thick that one can step five yards off the highway and not be able to see the road. The Japanese had honey-combed every hill and knoll at the Zig-Zag with foxholes linked by tunnels or trenches; at particularly advantageous Points they had constructed strong points centered on log or dirt pillboxes. All the defenses were well camouflaged, for rich, jungle foliage covered most positions, indicating that many had been prepared with great care and had been constructed well.

In effect, a small force could hold off an entire army from this position indefinitely.

On 31 January 1945, driving west of Olongapo, the 38th Division advanced east on the intricate maze of enemy fortifications in 'Zig-Zag Pass', at the same time seeking out both Japanese flanks. But on the morning of 1 February, after about three miles (4.8 km) of steady progress, the 152nd Regiment ran into Japanese strongpoints at 'Horseshoe Bend', the first known major 'Zig-Zag Pass' obstacles. In two days of heavy fighting, resulting in high casualties for the regiment, all eastward progress had stopped. The unfavorable, twisting terrain, communications difficulties in the thick jungle, and relocation of battalions to try to find the main line of resistance, along with a determined defense by the Japanese, all contributed to difficulty in correctly identifying all units of the 152nd at times with respect to their exact locations. The northwest to southeast line of Japanese defenses, definitively unknown at the time, also contributed to the confusion. With his offensive effectively stalled, Maj. Gen. Jones relieved the 152nd's regimental commander.

The 34th RCT was then ordered to resume the unsuccessful eastward offensive of the 152nd on 'Zig-Zag Pass'. However, after six days of severe fighting, despite heavy supporting artillery barrages and napalm bombing runs by the United States Army Air Forces (USAAF), the 34th RCT sustained heavy casualties, its offensive bogged down, barring any further progress. Gen. Jones then directed the 152nd to resume the attack on the Japanese to the north of Route 7, while on 6 February, the 151st Regiment rejoined the battle to relieve the disengaging 34th RCT. But further confusion and frustration on the pass reigned and on day's end, Maj. Gen. Hall relieved Maj. Gen. Jones of command and replaced him with Brigadier General William C. Chase.

On the day Brig. Gen. Chase assumed command, the 149th Infantry Regiment completed its eastward march north of Route 7 and linked up with XIV Corps. It then turned westward astride Route 7 to link up with the rest of the 38th Division. In tandem, the 151st and 152nd Regiments began making progress eastward through the pass. Gradually, the Japanese were pushed back and eventually overrun on 8 February. Three days later, on 11 February, the 151st was withdrawn for another mission; while the 152nd continued the offensive, and by 14 February 1945, the 149th and 152nd Regiments finally linked up.

After mopping up operations against scattered small pockets of resistance, 'Zig-Zag Pass' was securely in the hands of the 38th Division. As a testament to the ferocity of the struggle, XI Corps killed about 2,400 of the 2,800-man Japanese force while taking only 25 prisoners.

=== Landings at Southern Bataan ===
By 15 February, two 38th Division task forces under XI Corps were employed for the southern Bataan amphibious landings. One, the South Force commanded personally by Brig. Gen. Chase, consisted of the 151st Infantry Regiment reinforced by a battalion of the 34th RCT, the 139th Field Artillery Battalion, and other attached elements. The other, the East Force, consisted of the reinforced 1st Infantry Regiment of the 6th Infantry Division, was attached to the 38th Division for the mission. Brig. Gen. William Spence, the 38th Division Artillery commander, led the force.

On 11 February, the South Force sailed south off the west coast north of Bataan, spent the night of 14 February at sea, and went ashore at 10:00 on 15 February at Mariveles Harbor. LVTs from the 727th Amphibian Tractor Battalion carried the 151st Infantry Regiment ashore from the LSTs that were offshore nearly five miles (8.0 km), then provided covering fire from their .50 Cal and .30 Cal machine guns as they landed at Mariveles. Bullet-pierced American World War I type steel helmets were found that had been there for three years, along with the whitened remains of American soldiers that the Japanese had not buried. From Mariveles the force split, part moving up the west coast toward Bagac, the other part moving up the east coast toward Pilar.

Meanwhile, the East Force moved on 12 February from Dinalupihan south toward Pilar. It was soon augmented by elements of the 149th Infantry Regiment. At Pilar the force split, part continuing south past the town, and part turning west astride Route 111. On 18 February the two forces linked up near Bagac. A final major engagement occurred during the night of 15 February, and mopping up operations continued throughout the peninsula for about another week. Finally, on 21 February, after three years, Bataan was again secure in American and Filipino hands.

== Aftermath ==
The Japanese lost heavily on the defense of 'Zig-Zag Pass', with more than 2,400 killed and 75 wounded. Col. Nagayoshi escaped with about 300 men and joined other defenders farther south of the peninsula, holding out until mid-February. The 38th Infantry Division lost 270 men and had 420 wounded, while the 34th Regiment suffered 68 dead and 268 wounded.

Except for the 38th Division's brutal struggle at 'Zig-Zag Pass', the swift and easy recapture of the province of Zambales and the Bataan peninsula enabled the Americans full use of Manila Bay and its world-class deepwater port. This development subsequently allowed the easy resupply of US forces retaking Manila.

== See also ==
- Aubrey Newman
- Bataan death march
- Military History of the Philippines during World War II
- Military history of the United States
- Military history of Japan
- History of the Philippines
