= 238th Regiment =

238th Regiment may refer to:

- 238th Aviation Regiment, United States Army
- 238th Cavalry Regiment, United States Army
- 238th Infantry Regiment, Imperial Japanese Army
