= Robert Tyndall =

United States Army general and politician

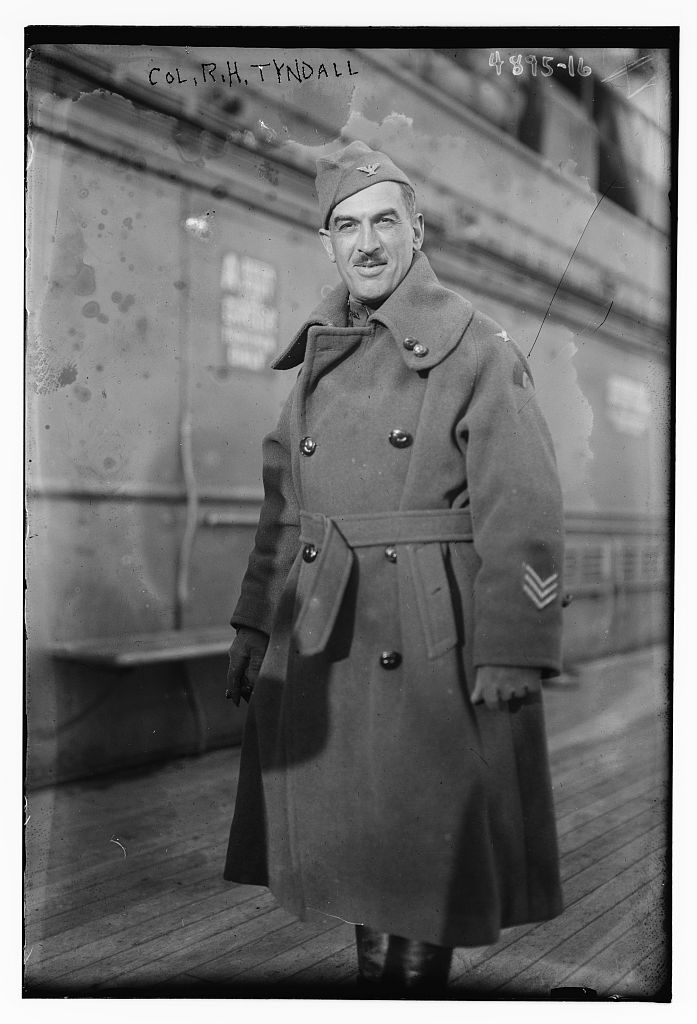
- Tyndall in 1919

34th Mayor of Indianapolis
- In office 1943–1947
- Preceded by: Reginald H. Sullivan
- Succeeded by: George L. Denny

Personal details
- Born: 2 May 1877 Indianapolis, Indiana
- Died: 9 July 1947 (aged 70) Indianapolis, Indiana
- Resting place: Crown Hill Cemetery and Arboretum, Section 36, Lot 162
- Party: Republican
- Parent(s): William Eddy Tyndall; Alice Boyd

Military service
- Branch/service: United States Army
- Rank: Major General
- Unit: 38th Infantry Division
- Commands: 150th Field Artillery Regiment, 38th Infantry Division
- Battles/wars: Spanish–American War, Mexican Border Campaign, World War I, World War II

Robert Henry Tyndall (2 May 1877 – 9 July 1947) was a United States artillery officer in World War I, a major general, and mayor of Indianapolis during World War II.

== Early career ==
Robert Tyndall was born in Indianapolis, the son of William Eddy and Alice (Boyd) Tyndall.

In 1897, Tyndall enlisted in Battery A of the Indiana National Guard. The Spanish–American War erupted the following year, and he served with the 27th Indiana Volunteers in Puerto Rico.

Following the war, Tyndall engaged in a number of business ventures. In 1908, he married Dean Spellman, a daughter of Samuel and Emma Spellman of Indianapolis. The couple had three children. During 1915 and 1916, he served as president of the Indiana Society Sons of the American Revolution. In 1916, he sold out to his business partner and rejoined the military.

== World War I ==
Tyndall served as a major in command of a battalion of the Indiana Field Artillery, which was at service on the Mexican border when the United States declared war on Germany in 1917. As the United States mobilized for World War I, the Indiana Field Artillery became federalized as the 150th Field Artillery Regiment, and assigned to the 42nd Infantry "Rainbow" Division, which participated in several major battles in 1918. Tyndall was promoted to colonel in command of the entire regiment, which was issued French 155 millimeter cannons. The men referred to him simply as "Bob," and generally admired him as an officer who had started as a private and worked his way up through the ranks.

Colonel Tyndall was awarded the Distinguished Service Medal, the Croix de Guerre, and Légion d'honneur. He served in the army of occupation in Germany until 1919, where he suffered from a severe case of the flu. After recovering, Tyndall rejoined the 150th and returned to the United States, where he was honorably discharged from active service in May 1919.

Tyndall returned to business, and served as vice-president of the Fletcher American Bank from 1919 to 1925. During those same years, he was the national treasurer of the American Legion, and worked to establish the organization in Indianapolis. He continued to work with several businesses in the following years.

== Major General ==
Tyndall continued to serve as a colonel in the Field Artillery Officer's Reserve Corps. In 1923, he was put in command of the 38th Infantry "Cyclone" Division, and he was promoted to major general on 29 October 1924. In 1941, Tyndall mobilized the 50,000 troops of the 38th Division at Camp Shelby, but was forced to retire in May as he reached the mandatory retirement age of sixty-four.

== Mayor of Indianapolis ==
Robert Tyndall, a Republican, was elected mayor of Indianapolis in 1942, and served until his death in 1947, at age 70. His term is remembered for long-term planning to achieve grade separation, smoke abatement, revamping of the city's sewer and sanitation systems, and non-partisan administration of City Hospital.

== Death ==
He died on 9 July 1947 in Indianapolis, Indiana. He is buried at Crown Hill Cemetery in Indianapolis.

== Legacy ==
Tyndall Armory, in downtown Indianapolis, is named in honor of Robert Tyndall. The armory was the headquarters for the 76th Infantry Brigade Combat Team from 1969 until 2011, when the unit moved to a new facility at the former Fort Benjamin Harrison.

Political offices
| Preceded by Reginald H. Sullivan | Mayor of Indianapolis; 1943–1947 | Succeeded by George L. Denny |
