= 38th Infantry Division (United States) =

US Army National Guard formation

- 38th Infantry Division shoulder sleeve insignia
- Active: 18 July 1917–8 March 1919; 16 March 1923–9 November 1945; 5 March 1947–present
- Country: United States
- Branch: Army National Guard
- Type: Infantry
- Size: Division
- Garrison/HQ: Indianapolis, Indiana
- Nicknames: "Cyclone" (special designation), "Avengers of Bataan"
- Engagements: World War I; World War II; New Guinea; Leyte; Luzon
- Decorations: Philippine Presidential Unit Citation, Meritorious Unit Commendation with oak leaf

Commanders
- Current commander: Brigadier General Joseph H. Gardner II
- Command Sergeant Major: CSM Aaron T. Lester

Insignia
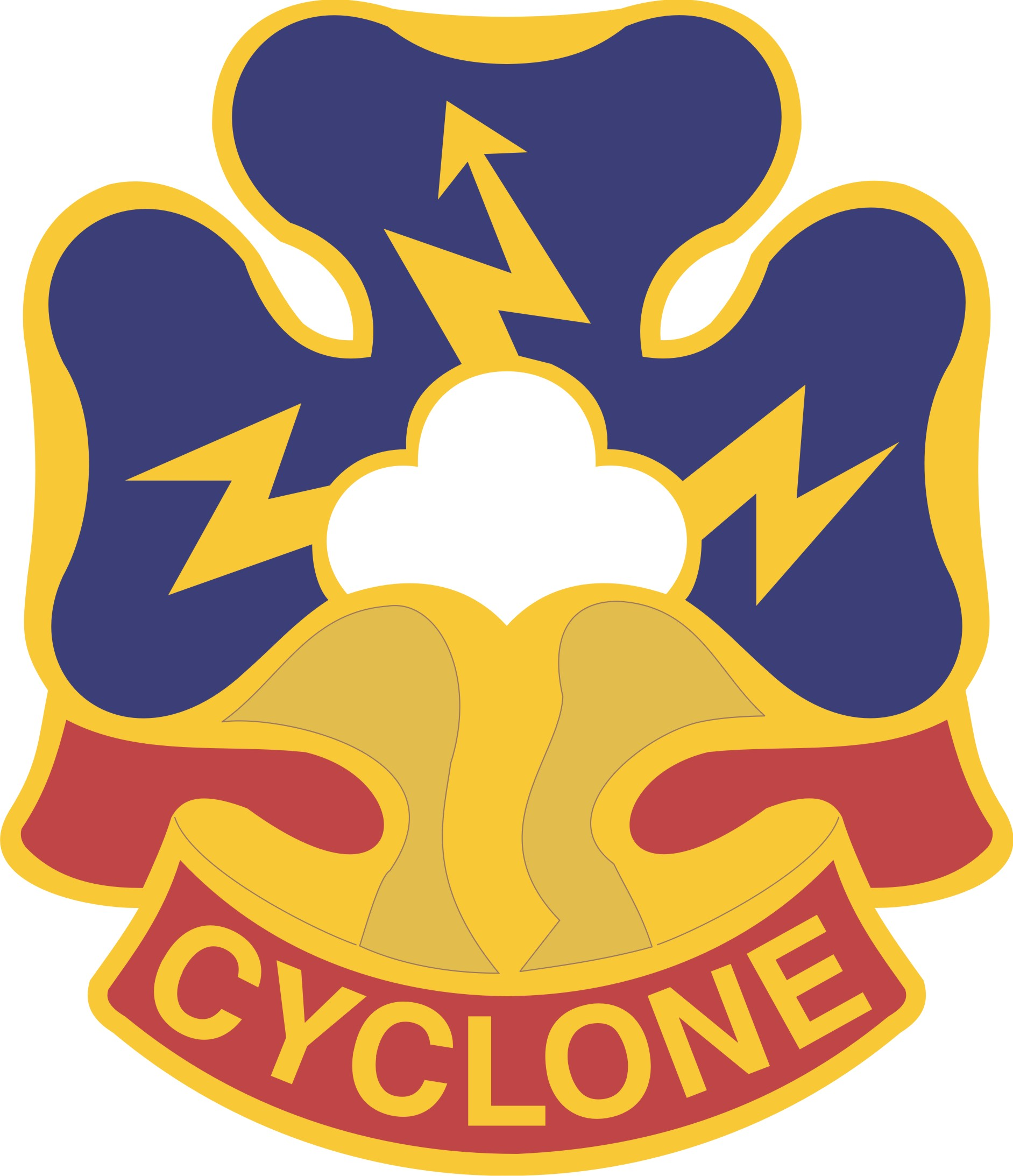
- Distinctive Unit Insignia

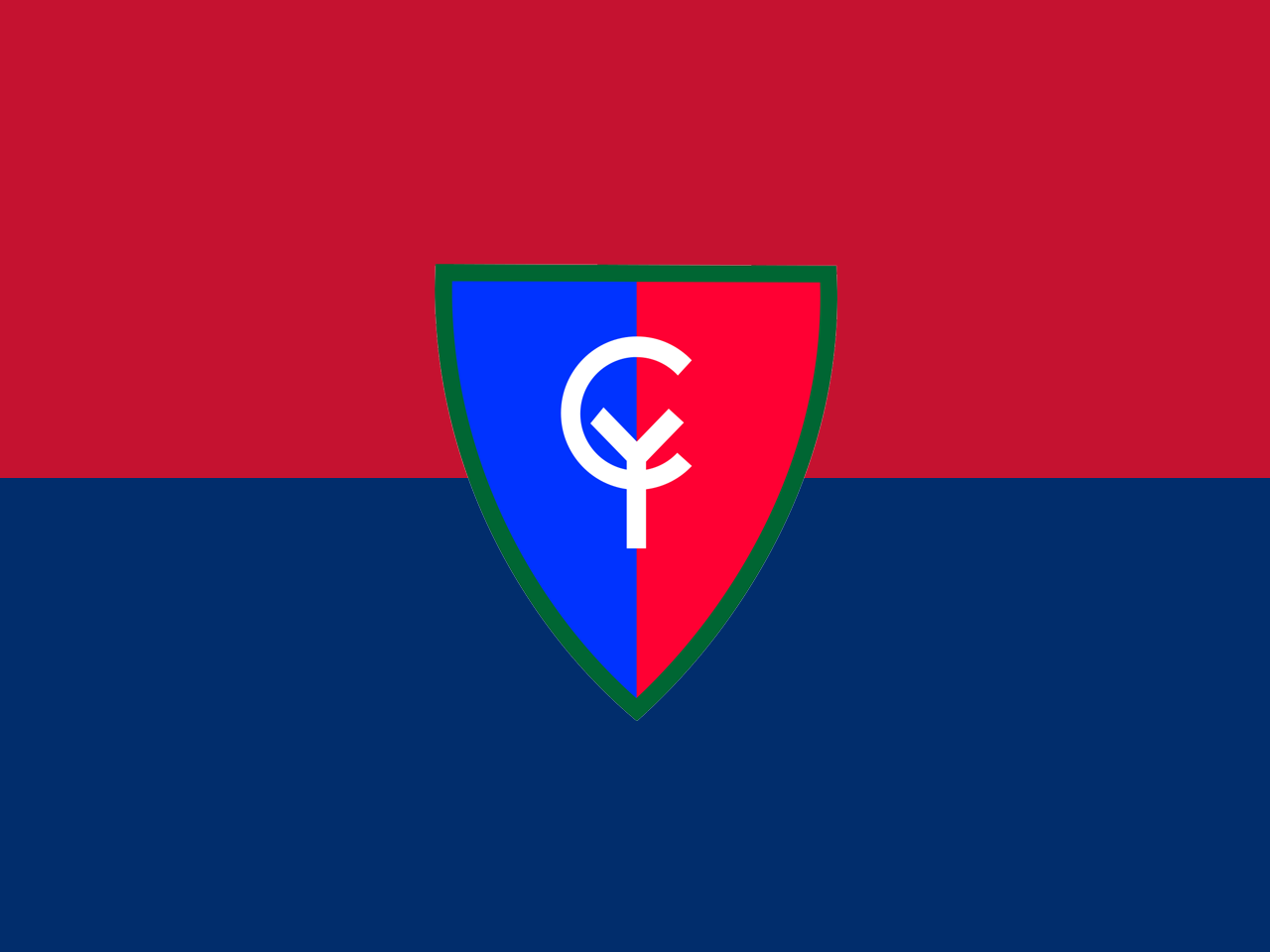
- Flag of the United States Army 38th Infantry Division

The 38th Infantry Division is an infantry division of the United States Army and part of the Indiana National Guard. It is headquartered in Indianapolis, Indiana, and contains Army National Guard units from across the Midwest.

Formed in 1917, the division's special designation "Cyclone" refers to when the division's training camp at Camp Shelby, Mississippi, was damaged by a tornado. It is also nicknamed "Avengers of Bataan" due to its efforts during the Pacific War in World War II.

Deployed to France in the closing days of the Great War, the 38th Division was broken up to fill vacancies in units already in combat. After the war, the 38th Division demobilized. After a brief period of inactivity, it was reconstituted and reorganized in the National Guard on 16 March 1923.

The 38th Division was inducted into federal service on 17 January 1941 as the United States prepared for entry into World War II. The Division returned to Camp Shelby to reorganize as a triangular infantry division and train for combat. The 38th Infantry Division deployed to the Pacific theater in January 1944, initially to New Guinea where the division saw limited combat after final training. In December, the division deployed into Leyte, Philippines to support clearing and security operations. On 29 January 1945, the 38th Infantry Division took part in the combat landing against the Japanese held Southern Zambales Province on the island of Luzon. Afterwards, the 38th Infantry Division took part in the operations to clear Zig Zag Pass and the Bataan peninsula, and to secure Corregidor and Manila Bay. In recognition of their contributions in clearing the Philippines, the 38th Infantry Division received the nickname "The Avengers of Bataan".

Quickly demobilized after World War II, the 38th Infantry Division was reorganized and federally recognized on 5 March 1947 at Indianapolis, Indiana. During the intervening years, the 38th Infantry Division underwent numerous reorganizations while still retaining the designation as an infantry division. The 38th Infantry Division headquarters mobilized in support of Hurricane Katrina relief operations in 2005, exercising command and control over all National Guard elements deployed in the state of Mississippi. Since 11 September 2001, units of the division have participated in Operation Enduring Freedom (in Kuwait, Afghanistan, the Balkans, Cuba, and the Horn of Africa) and Operation Iraqi Freedom. In 2009, the 38th Infantry Division provided a headquarters element (designated Task Force Cyclone) to command and control counterinsurgency operations in Regional Command East, Afghanistan from August 2009 through June 2010.

The 38th Infantry Division headquarters had responsibility for the domestic all-hazards response team (DART) mission in support of the Federal Emergency Management Agency (FEMA) in the event of a major incident in the eastern half of the United States.

Most recently the 38th Infantry Division headquarters deployed in support of Operation Spartan Shield (OSS) in 2019 and 2024. Operation Spartan Shield includes operations in Kuwait, Jordan, Saudi Arabia, Qatar and United Arab Emirates (UAE). 38th Infantry Division Soldiers have also supported COVID-19 relief operations, as well as civil disturbance operations in Indianapolis and Washington, D.C.

== History ==
=== World War I ===
The 38th Infantry Division's headquarters was activated at Camp Shelby on 25 August 1917, almost five months after the American entry into World War I, composed of units drawn from Indiana, Kentucky, and West Virginia. Major General William H. Sage, a Medal of Honor recipient from the Philippine–American War was its first commander. With new naming conventions issued by the War Department, National Guard regiments were given three-digit numbers from 101 through 300 (for example, the 1st Indiana Infantry Regiment became the 151st Infantry Regiment), and National Guard divisions were numbered from 26 through 75. Troops began to arrive at Camp Shelby, Mississippi for training in September. Once there, the 38th Division was organized into a "square" division, centered around two infantry brigades; the 75th Infantry Brigade and the 76th Infantry Brigade, the 138th, 139th, and 163rd Field Artillery Regiments, the 113th Engineer Regiment, the 113th Sanitary Train, and a separate signal battalion.

After constructing their base camp at Camp Shelby, the 38th Infantry Division began training in October. Equipment for training was chronically short, however, forcing leaders to fabricate dummy artillery pieces from wood and iron scrap, while the soldiers drilled with pieces of wood to simulate rifles and machine guns. In April 1918, a tornado struck Camp Shelby, damaging the division's camp and killing one soldier, PVT Vaughn D. Beekman. On his assumption of command of the 38th Division on 30 August 1918, Major General Robert Lee Howze commemorated the tornado by announcing the division would be known in the future as the "Cyclone Division".

The division arrived in France in October, at the height of the Meuse–Argonne offensive. Upon arrival, the division was largely stripped of officers and men, who served as replacements for other units of the American Expeditionary Forces (AEF) already in combat. Several of the regiments remained intact and conducted operations behind friendly lines. The 113th Engineer Battalion constructed railroads, telegraph and telephone wires. The 138th and 139th Field Artillery took part in collective training when the Armistice with Germany took effect on 11 November 1918.

Of the officers and men from the 38th Division detailed to other units, 301 died during the Great War: 105 died in combat; 47 died from wounds; 68 from non-combat accidents or incidents; and 81 from complications arising from influenza or pneumonia.

- Commanders: Maj. Gen. William H. Sage (25 August 1917), Brig. Gen. Edward M. Lewis, ad interim, (19 September 1917), Brig. Gen. H. H. Whitney, ad interim, (8 November 1917), Maj. Gen. William H. Sage (12 December 1917), Brig. Gen. William H. Sage (15 March 1918), Brig. Gen. William V. Judson, ad interim, (15 April 1918), Brig. Gen. Augustine McIntyre Jr., ad interim, (12 July 1918), Brig. Gen. F. M. Caldwell, ad interim, (18 July 1918), Maj. Gen. Robert L. Howze (30 August 1918), Brig. Gen. F. M. Caldwell, ad interim, (18 October 1918), Maj. Gen. Robert L. Howze (27 October 1918).
- Inactivated: June 1919.

=== Interwar period ===
After the end of the World War, the National Guard divisions briefly remained inactive while the United States rapidly demobilized and returned to a peacetime footing. The experiences of the war convinced the War Department and Congress to retain a reserve structure in the event of a future war. A series of amendments to the National Defense Act of 1916 codified the structure of the Army of the United States to include the National Guard when in federal service. Within the text of the final amendment of August 1921 was the provision to "preserve the names, numbers and other designations, flags and records of the divisions...that served in the World War".

At the company level, the first units were organized by spring 1921; by November 1921 the Indiana National Guard had approximately 4,000 soldiers in an active drilling status. Higher-level actions took longer, with the 38th Division headquarters not organized and federally recognized until March 1923, with Major General Robert H. Tyndall as the division commander. Tyndall well embodied the citizen-soldier concept. During the World War, Tyndall earned the Distinguished Service Medal and Croix de Guerre for his successful combat leadership of the 150th Field Artillery. In peacetime, he served as a bank vice-president and was deeply engaged in the organization of the American Legion. The majority of the divisional structure was allotted to Indiana, with the divisional headquarters established in Indianapolis. Besides the headquarters, the 76th Infantry Brigade (with the 151st and 152nd Infantry Regiments), 139th and 150th Field Artillery Regiments, and the 113th Engineer Regiment were allotted solely to Indiana. Kentucky organized the 75th Infantry Brigade (149th Infantry Regiment; the 150th Infantry was earmarked for West Virginia) and the 138th Field Artillery Regiment. The medical, quartermaster, and division special troops elements were divided among Indiana and Kentucky.

The designated mobilization training center for the “Cyclone Division” was Camp Knox, Kentucky, where much of the division's training activities occurred between the wars. The 38th Division was fortunate in that it was one of the few multistate divisions that had the opportunity to train together each summer prior to World War II, and the entire division (except West Virginia's 150th Infantry) conducted its summer camp most years at Camp Knox from 1923 to 1939. For the 1936 camp, the division participated in the Fifth Corps Area phase of the Second Army maneuvers at Fort Knox. During that maneuver, the 38th Division operated as part of the provisional V Corps against the 10th Infantry Brigade, 5th Division. Additionally, the division staff participated in the Fifth Corps Area command post exercise (CPX) in May 1929 and in the Second Army CPX in September 1938 at Fort Knox. In 1940, the entire “Cyclone” Division again participated in the Second Army maneuvers, this time near Camp McCoy, Wisconsin. In addition to summer training, the entire division, less the West Virginia elements, was called up for flood relief duty in January and February 1937 when the Ohio River overflowed in one of the worst floods in its history.

=== World War II ===
==== WWII division organization ====
===== Square division =====
On 17 January 1941, the 38th Division was inducted into federal service at home stations and then moved to Camp Shelby in Mississippi, where it arrived on 26 January 1941. At the time the division still retained its World War I square organization and consisted of the following units.

38th Division square organization (click to enlarge)

- 38th Division, in Indianapolis (IN)
  - 38th Division Headquarters
  - 75th Infantry Brigade, in Bowling Green (KY)
    - Headquarters and Headquarters Company, in Bowling Green (KY)
    - 149th Infantry Regiment, in Louisville (KY)
      - Headquarters and Headquarters Company
      - 3× Infantry battalions
        - each battalion consists of: 1× Headquarters and Headquarters Detachment, 3× Rifle companies, 1× Weapons Company
      - Anti-Tank Company (M3 37mm Anti-Tank guns)
      - Service Company
    - 150th Infantry Regiment, in Welch (WV)
      - same organization as 149th Infantry Regiment
  - 76th Infantry Brigade, in Shelbyville (IN)
    - Headquarters and Headquarters Company, in Shelbyville (IN)
    - 151st Infantry Regiment, in Indianapolis (IN)
      - same organization as 149th Infantry Regiment
    - 152nd Infantry Regiment, in Indianapolis (IN)
      - same organization as 149th Infantry Regiment
  - 63rd Field Artillery Brigade, in Louisville (KY)
    - Headquarters and Headquarters Battery, in Louisville (KY)
    - 138th Field Artillery Regiment, Louisville (KY)
      - Headquarters and Headquarters Battery
      - 2× Light Field Artillery battalions
        - Headquarters and Headquarters Battery
        - 3× Howitzer batteries (M1897 75mm field guns), replaced by M2 105mm towed howitzers in 1941)
        - Service Battery
    - 139th Field Artillery Regiment, in Indianapolis (IN)
      - same organization as 138th Field Artillery Regiment
    - 150th Field Artillery Regiment, in Indianapolis (IN)
      - Headquarters and Headquarters Battery
      - 2× Medium Field Artillery battalions
        - Headquarters and Headquarters Battery
        - 3× Howitzer batteries (M1918 155mm towed howitzers, replaced by M1 155mm towed howitzers in 1941)
        - Anti-Tank Battery (M1897 75mm anti-tank guns)
        - Service Battery
  - 113th Engineer Regiment, in Gary (IN)
    - Headquarters and Headquarters and Service Company
    - 2× Engineer battalions
      - each battalion consists of: 1× Headquarters, 3× Engineer companies
  - 113th Medical Regiment, in Indianapolis (IN)
    - Headquarters and Headquarters and Service Company
    - Collecting Battalion
      - battalion consists of: 1× Headquarters, 3× Collecting companies
    - Ambulance Battalion
      - battalion consists of: 1× Headquarters, 3× Ambulance companies
    - Clearing Battalion
      - battalion consists of: 1× Headquarters, 3× Clearing companies
  - 113th Quartermaster Regiment, in Indianapolis (IN)
    - Headquarters and Headquarters Company
    - 2× Truck battalions
      - each battalion consists of: 1× Headquarters, 2× Truck companies
    - Light Maintenance and Car Battalion
      - battalion consists of: 1× Headquarters, 1× Light Maintenance Company, 1× Car Company
    - Service Company
  - Headquarters, Special Troops, in Indianapolis (IN)
    - Headquarters Company, 38th Division, in Indianapolis (IN)
    - 38th Signal Company, in Indianapolis (IN)
    - 113th Ordnance Company, in Bardstown (KY)
    - 38th Military Police Company, in Jackson (KY)

===== Triangular division =====
After the division's basic training, it participated in the V Corps maneuver in June 1941, and in the Louisiana Maneuvers in August–September 1941. On 1 March 1942, as a part of an Army-wide reorganization of National Guard divisions, the 38th Division was reorganized as a triangular division. The division's two brigade headquarters were disbanded in favor of a structure containing three separate regimental commands reporting directly to the division headquarters, as well as four field artillery battalions under a division artillery headquarters, with the engineer, medical, and quartermaster regiments also reduced to battalions. On the same date, the 150th Infantry Regiment was relieved from assignment the division and transferred to the Panama Canal Zone, where it served through the rest of the war. With the reorganization the division was renamed 38th Infantry Division. Afterwards the 38th Infantry Division was composed of the following units:

38th Infantry Division triangular organization (click to enlarge)

- 38th Infantry Division
  - 38th Infantry Division Headquarters
  - 38th Cavalry Reconnaissance Troop (Mechanized) (M3 scout cars and then M8 Greyhound armored cars)
  - 149th Infantry Regiment
    - Headquarters and Headquarters Company
    - 3× Infantry battalions
      - each battalion consists of: 1× Headquarters and Headquarters Company, 3× Rifle companies, 1× Heavy Weapons Company
    - Cannon Company (T12 Gun Motor Carriages and T19 Howitzer Motor Carriages, later replaced by either M3 105mm towed howitzers or M7 Priest self propelled howitzers)
    - Anti-Tank Company (M3 37mm anti-tank guns, which were replaced by 1944 with M1 57mm anti-tank guns)
    - Service Company
  - 151st Infantry Regiment
    - same organization as 149th Infantry Regiment
  - 152nd Infantry Regiment
    - same organization as 149th Infantry Regiment
  - 38th Infantry Division Artillery
    - Headquarters and Headquarters Battery
    - 138th Field Artillery Battalion
      - Headquarters and Headquarters Battery
      - 3× Batteries (M2 105mm towed howitzers)
      - Service Battery
    - 139th Field Artillery Battalion
      - same organization as 138th Field Artillery Battalion
    - 150th Field Artillery Battalion
      - Headquarters and Headquarters Battery
      - 3× Batteries (M1 155mm towed howitzers)
      - Service Battery
    - 163rd Field Artillery Battalion
      - same organization as 138th Field Artillery Battalion
  - Headquarters Special Troops
    - Headquarters Company, 38th Infantry Division
    - 38th Signal Company
    - 38th Quartermaster Company
    - 738th Ordnance Light Maintenance Company
    - 113th Military Police Platoon
    - 38th Infantry Division Band (attached)
  - 38th Quartermaster Battalion (Between September and November 1942 Quartermaster battalions were disbanded and their platoons used to form a Quartermaster Company and an Ordnance Company, which were both assigned to Headquarters Special Troops)
    - Headquarters and Headquarters Company (includes a service platoon and a maintenance platoon)
    - Truck Company
  - 113th Engineer Combat Battalion
    - Headquarters and Headquarters and Service Company
    - 3× Engineer combat companies
  - 113th Medical Battalion
    - Headquarters and Headquarters Detachment
    - 3× Collecting companies
    - Clearing Company

==== Combat chronicle ====
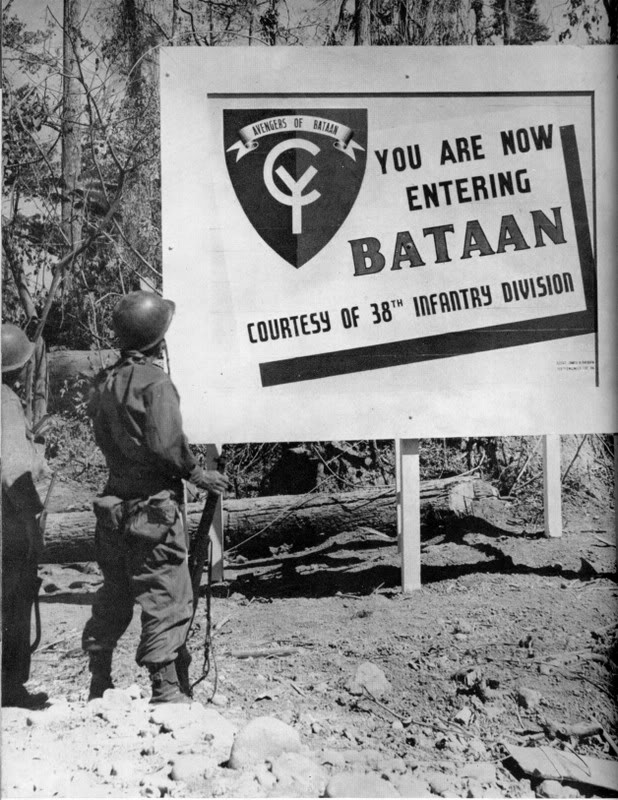
Sign erected in the Philippines during World War II.

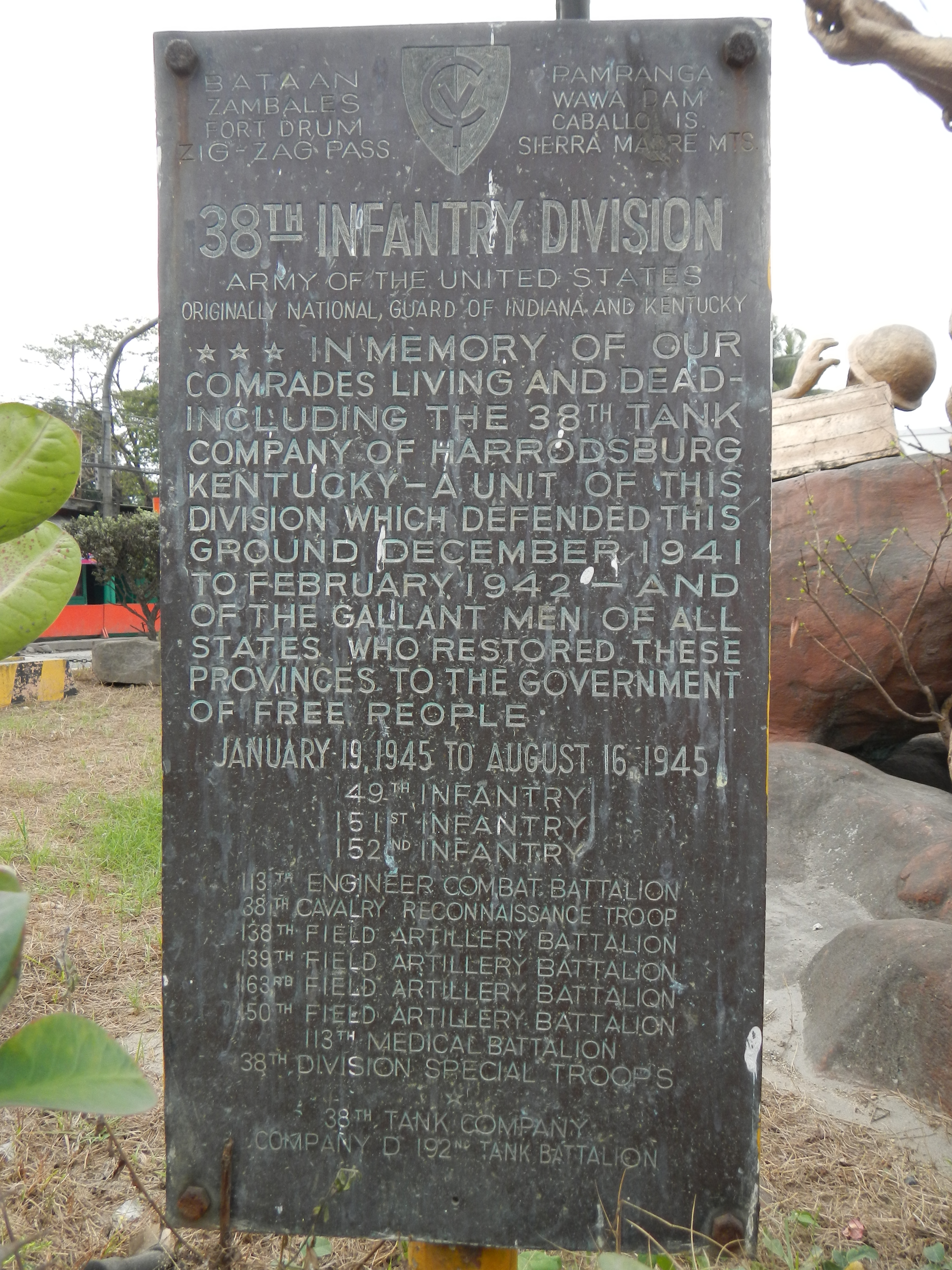
Historical marker (38th Infantry Division, Battle of Bataan, Layac Junction).

The 38th Infantry Division arrived in Hawaii on 17 January 1944. It received further training and the duty of the defense of Oahu. The division embarked from Hawaii to New Guinea, where the combat elements conducted final combat rehearsals (made realistic by the presence of bypassed Japanese troops) from July to November 1944. Once rehearsals were complete, the 38th Infantry Division sailed for Leyte, landing in December 1944. Enemy paratroops attempted to capture the Buri, Bayug, and San Pablo airstrips on 6 December. The 149th Infantry Regiment destroyed organized resistance, 11 December, and defended the strips until relieved, 4 January 1945. The division landed in the San Narciso area in Southern Zambales Province, Luzon, 29 January 1945, without opposition. The San Marcelino airstrip was secured on the same day and the port facilities at Olongapo were captured on the 30th as well as Grande Island in Subic Bay after an amphibious landing. Driving west of Olongapo the 38th destroyed an intricate maze of enemy fortifications in Zig-Zag Pass. While elements landed at Mariveles on the southern tip of the peninsula, 15 February, other units pushed down the east coast road to Pilar and across the neck of land to Bagac along the route of the March of Death. The Bataan Peninsula was secured on 21 February, although mopping-up activities remained. The 38th Infantry Division's rapid drive across the peninsula was critical to MacArthur's campaign plan by preventing a Japanese withdrawal into Bataan - thereby avoiding a costly siege operation.

2nd Battalion of the 151st Infantry, along with elements from the Cannon and anti-tank companies, moved to Corregidor, 24 February, to clear the remaining Japanese defenders from the Rock. The same battalion assaulted and captured Caballo Island, 27 March, and Fort Drum on El Fraile Island, 13 April. 1st Battalion 151st Infantry captured Carabao Island on 16 April. Supporting operations in March included a major push against dug-in Japanese defenders in the mountainous terrain between Fort Stotsenburg and Mount Pinatubo by the 38th Division Advance (consisting of the 149th Regimental Combat Team (RCT), the 169th RCT, and all the 38th Division's artillery). Once the enemy was broken, combat elements of the 152nd Infantry pushed north from San Felipe to Palauig Bay and east from Botolan along the Capas Trail cutting the enemy's withdrawal route.

The Division moved to the area east of Manila, 1 May, and attacked enemy forces behind the Shimbu Line. By 30 June effective enemy opposition had been broken, although the division remained engaged in active combat operations until 14 August 1945 when President Harry S. Truman announced Japan's acceptance of the Potsdam Declaration and unconditional surrender. As of 14 August 1945, the 38th Infantry Division had completed an unbroken stretch of 198 consecutive days in combat, officially killing 26,469 enemy combatants, and taking 1411 Japanese prisoners. Although officially not "engaged in major combat" after 14 August, elements of the division continued to mop up Japanese stragglers in the Luzon area (who usually resisted to the death), until the signing of the VJ Day surrender documents on 2 September 1945. Even after VJ Day, the division's combat outposts continued to net prisoners until the division was officially relieved on 5 October 1945. In the final tally, the 38th Infantry Division fought against more than 80,000 Japanese, killing 26,732 and ultimately taking more than 13,000 prisoners. For its swift clearing of the Bataan peninsula in 19 days of bloody combat, division commander Major General William C. Chase, ordered that the division would be known as the "Avengers of Bataan", a tribute often attributed to General Douglas MacArthur.

==== Casualties ====
- Total battle casualties: 3,464
- Killed in action: 645
- Wounded in action: 2,814
- Missing in action: 5

==== Statistics ====
- Ordered into federal service: 17 January 1941 (National Guard Division from Indiana, Kentucky, and West Virginia).
- Overseas: 3 January 1944.
- Campaigns: New Guinea, Southern Philippines, Luzon.
- Distinguished Unit Citations: 1.
- Awards: MH -1; Distinguished Service Cross (United States)-6; Distinguished Service Medal (United States)-1; Silver Star-225; Legion of Merit-9; Silver Star-25; Bronze Star-1,283; Air Medal-66.
- Commanders: Maj. Gen. Robert H. Tyndall (January–April 1941), Maj. Gen. Daniel I. Sultan (April 1941 – April 1942), Maj. Gen. Henry L. L. Jones (April 1942 – February 1945), Maj. Gen. William C. Chase (February–July 1945), Maj. Gen. Frederick A. Irving (August 1945 to inactivation).
- Returned to U.S.: 30 October 1945.
- Inactivated: 10 November 1945 at Camp Anza, California.

=== Cold War ===
After the end of World War II, the 38th Infantry Division briefly remained in the Philippines pending a decision as to whether or not the division would remain on occupation duty. Instead, the division was alerted on 15 September 1945 that it was to return to the United States and demobilize. Major General Irving and key staffers flew from Manila, while the bulk of the division elements sailed from the Philippines beginning in October. The 38th Infantry Division was directed to Camp Anza, California, for final demobilization and inactivation, which was completed on 9 November 1945.

For a time, the 38th Infantry Division remained inactivated while debate raged within the federal government as to the size, scope and even the necessity for a separate Army National Guard. In October 1945, the War Department issued directives to reconstitute the Army National Guard as an integral part of the Reserve Component which still retained the unique dual nature of the pre-war Guard. First priority under the new plan was the organization and reactivation of eighteen division headquarters, one of which was the 38th Infantry Division.

Within Indiana, organizational actions were already in the works led by Indiana Adjutant General Ben H. Watt. By March 1946, Watt submitted a proposed recruitment quota to the National Guard Bureau (NGB), and designated commanders in anticipation of receiving approval for the reorganizing units. Receiving approval from NGB in October 1946, Indiana began organizing and reconstituting the subordinate elements of the 38th Infantry Division. Unit strength grew quickly, swelled by large numbers of World War II veterans. The influx of tested combat leaders facilitated the activation of the Headquarters and Special Troops unit of the 38th Infantry Division, which officially organized in Indianapolis on 6 October 1946, and received federal recognition on 5 March 1947.

Unlike the pre-war 38th Division, the post-war 38th Infantry Division force structure was allotted entirely to Indiana, and consisted of a triangular structure (three infantry regiments, with three line battalions per regiment) with a total authorization of 16,241 officers, non-commissioned officers (NCOs) and soldiers. Despite an aggressive recruiting campaign, the Division's subordinate units were not sufficiently organized to permit Annual Training (AT) at Camp Atterbury until 1948.

In 1959, the 38th Infantry Division underwent the first major reorganization since the War, with the regiments converted into Pentomic battle groups by the inclusion of fire support and logistics elements as organic parts of the combat formation. In 1968, the division was the first reserve formation to adopt the new Reorganization Objective Army Division (ROAD) Table of Organization and Equipment, which included three brigade headquarters tailored by the attachment of combat and support battalions. Accompanying the ROAD reorganization was the return to multi-state aspect of the pre-war division, with the division headquarters, divisional artillery, and the 76th Infantry Brigade stationed in Indiana, with the remaining two infantry brigades organized in Ohio and Michigan. In 1994, the division headquarters reorganized as a mechanized infantry division headquarters, a designation which it retained until 2008.

During the Cold War, the 38th Infantry Division formed part of the Strategic Reserve to support the Active Army in the event of a full-scale war with the Soviet Union and her satellites. In 1965, the Division was designated part of the Selected Reserve Force, higher priority Reserve Component units that received better equipment and greater funding in order to maintain higher levels of readiness. In 1981, elements of the 38th Infantry Division took part in Exercise REFORGER (Return of Forces to Germany) as a way of testing the United States' ability to strategically deploy reserves into West Germany in response to a Warsaw Pact invasion. Other elements of the 38th Infantry Division, both company sized units as well as individual Soldiers, have participated in Overseas Deployment for Training missions in Germany, the United Kingdom, Republic of Korea, Japan, and in Central America.

With the exception of Company D (Ranger), 151st Infantry, elements of the 38th Infantry Division were not activated for federal service in combat operations from 1945 until Operation Desert Storm in 1990. However, elements of the Division were frequently called up for State Active Duty to support civil authorities in mitigating the effects of natural disasters and civil unrest. Two of the largest callups were for the Perfect Circle strike of 1955 and the Palm Sunday tornado outbreak of April 1965.

Company D (Ranger), 151st Infantry was the sole divisional element (and one of a small number of National Guard units) mobilized for service in the Republic of Vietnam and was one of the most highly decorated units to serve in that conflict.

In 1996, over 7,000 soldiers from the 38th Infantry Division (from Indiana, Ohio, and Michigan) supported the Centennial Olympic Games in Atlanta, Georgia.

In 1996–1997, Echo Battery (Target Acquisition) 139th Field Artillery deployed to Bosnia as part of peacekeeping operations in the former Yugoslavia.

Also in 1998 the 76th Infantry Brigade (Separate) was selected to participate in a training deployment in the summer of 2000 to the Joint Readiness Training Center (JRTC) at Fort Polk, LA. The 38th Division Support Command (DISCOM) supported the JRTC rotation by operating the logistics support area (LSA), while many units within the division provided equipment and manpower to support the 76th Brigade. The equipment deployment from Indiana to JRTC was via river barge, among the largest moves of equipment for Indiana units since World War II.

=== Post 9/11 ===
Since the 11 September 2001 terrorist attacks, the 38th Infantry Division has provided headquarters and forces for a variety of operational rotations including Operation Iraqi Freedom (Iraq), Operation Enduring Freedom (Afghanistan and Cuba), Operation Joint Forge (Bosnia), Operation Joint Guardian (Kosovo), Combined Joint Task Force - Horn of Africa (Djibouti), Multinational Force and Observers (Egypt), United States Air Forces Europe (USAFE) Force Protection (England, Germany, Italy, and Belgium), Operation Noble Eagle (Continental United States) Rotations I through IV, Operation Desert Watch and Operation Desert Spring (Kuwait), and Operation Spartan Shield.

=== Hurricane Katrina relief efforts ===
On 29 August 2005, Hurricane Katrina made final landfall in Mississippi, causing tremendous damage which quickly overwhelmed state agencies. The governor of Mississippi appealed to other states for National Guard units to assist in the response. The rapid influx of Guard units from various states, although sorely needed, overwhelmed the Mississippi National Guard's ability to coordinate the military efforts. Accordingly, National Guard Bureau activated the headquarters of the 38th Infantry Division on 30 August to deploy to Mississippi and assist the Mississippi Adjutant General (TAG) with command and control efforts. Commanded by Major General (MG) Gregory Vadnais, the advanced party of the division deployed on 31 August 2005, while the main body departed Indianapolis by convoy on Saturday, 3 September 2005. Organized as Task Force (TF) Cyclone, the Division established command post operations in Gulfport Mississippi, focused on providing local security, road clearance, and delivery of essential humanitarian assistance. By the time TF Cyclone fully assumed mission on 4 September, roughly 7500 Guardsmen were on duty inside Mississippi. Final strength of TF Cyclone peaked at 15,500 on 7 September, with elements of the division engaged in missions until transfer of authority back to Mississippi began on 15 September 2005.

In November 2005 the division headquarters was given Training and Readiness Oversight responsibilities, under the modular organization then being adopted, over three brigade combat teams: the 37th Brigade in Ohio; the 76th Brigade in Indiana; the 149th Brigade in Kentucky and Alabama; and the 278th Armored Cavalry Regiment in Tennessee.

=== Afghanistan ===
In 2009, the 38th Infantry Division headquarters was alerted to deploy a command and control element to Afghanistan to replace an outgoing maneuver enhancement brigade (MEB) 1-star headquarters conducting full-spectrum counterinsurgency (COIN) operations within Bamyan, Parwan, Panjshir and Kapisa provinces. In addition to counterinsurgency, the 38th Infantry Division would assume responsibility for operating the mayor cells at Bagram Airfield and five other forward operating bases (FOBs). The divisional element was organized as Task Force Cyclone under the command of Brigadier General Joseph Lonnie Culver. After a period of pre-mobilization training, Task Force Cyclone deployed via Manas International Airport in Kyrgyzstan to Bagram Airfield and completed Transfer of Authority (TOA) on 31 August 2009. TF Cyclone assumed control of a diverse group of units in Regional Command East of 4100 US military members, including Army signal, civil affairs (CA), psychological operations, Military Police (MP), Embedded Training Teams (ETT), Agribusiness Development Teams (ADT); Air Force Facility/Base Engineering and Security. The task force contained units from five coalition partners: France, Mongolia, the United Arab Emirates, the New Zealand Provincial Reconstruction Team (in Bamiyan), Singapore, and Mongolia. The task force also had attached representatives from the United States Department of State, Agriculture, and US Agency for International Development (USAID).

While engaged in counterinsurgency in the Bamyan, Parwan, Panjshir and Kapisa provinces, TF Cyclone worked closely with subordinate Provincial Reconstruction Teams, village elders, district and provincial governors to support reconstruction efforts. By the time TF Cyclone transitioned from the COIN mission, over $5 billion in reconstruction projects had taken place with minimal interference from insurgents.

In January 2010, Task Force Cyclone was alerted to a change of mission to establish an area support group (ASG) over the Kabul base cluster. On 1 April 2010, TF Cyclone conducted a transfer of authority (TOA) with Task Force Wolverine (86th Infantry Brigade Combat Team) and assumed control over seven bases in the Kabul area.

During the time period in control of the Kabul base cluster, TF Cyclone oversaw the construction of four new base camps, refurbishing of the seven existing camps, and the streamlining of logistics and contracting processes in Kabul. In June 2010, TF Cyclone conducted relief in place operations with the 196th Maneuver Enhancement Brigade, and executed Transfer of Authority on 30 June 2010. After transiting Kyrgyzstan, TF Cyclone returned to Indianapolis, Indiana, on 02 July 2010. The unit proceeded to Camp Atterbury, Indiana and finished demobilization on the morning of 4 July 2010. Among some of TF Cyclone's major accomplishments: conduct of more than 7000 combat patrols, including 107 enemy contacts and 73 tactical vehicle recoveries, oversight of more than $3 billion in new construction, support to the Afghan National Government in conducting national elections, the saving of more than 300 Afghan civilians following a major avalanche in Parwan province, the capturing or killing of numerous insurgents, and significant improvements in local and provincial governance. The Headquarters of the 38th Infantry Division was awarded the Meritorious Unit Commendation (MUC) in recognition Task Force Cyclone's accomplishments in support of Operation Enduring Freedom.

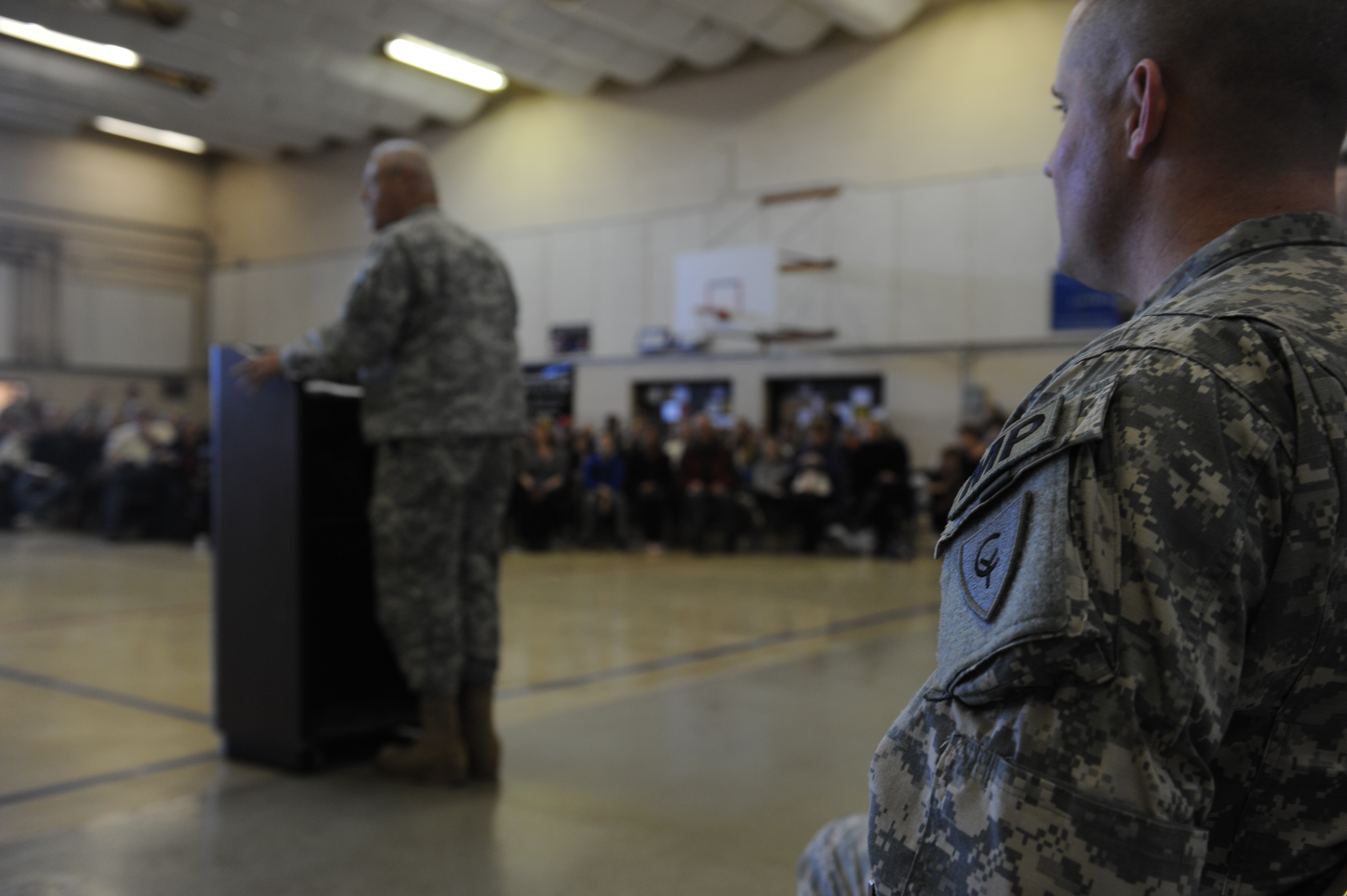
MG R. Martin Umbarger addresses the 939th Military Police Detachment during their departure ceremony on March 28, 2015

Two teams from the 38th Infantry Division also were mobilized to serve with Joint Task Force Guantanamo in Cuba in 2016–2017. JTF Guantanamo's function was to guard detainees seized during U.S. operations in Afghanistan and elsewhere.

=== Al Anbar Province during Iraq War ===
From October 2006 to September 2007, a company from the 38th Infantry Division saw extensive combat in Ramadi and Fallujah, Iraq. This company and its parent battalion came under the control of the 76th Infantry Brigade (Separate) just prior to the mobilization and deployment of 2006–07. Originally known as Company A, 2nd Battalion (Mechanized), 152nd Infantry Regiment, the unit became an expeditionary force with members from all companies in the battalion, and was renamed Headquarters, and Headquarters Company (-), and would come to be known as "Team Gator". Upon arrival in Al Anbar Province, the unit was assigned to the 1st Brigade, 1st Armored Division, and conducted extensive joint patrols and enemy clearing operations in both the Ramadi and Fallujah AOs during some of the most intense fighting of the 2006–07 campaign. One platoon would be assigned under the tactical control of USMC Regimental Combat Teams in the Fallujah AO, with the rest of the company being assigned to the Ready First Brigade in Ramadi. The company would also have a platoon from the Minnesota National Guard under its operational control.

When the 1st Brigade, 1st Armored Division departed Ramadi, the company would be assigned to a new brigade, 1st Brigade, 3rd Infantry Division (Raider Brigade), and it would participate in major clearing operations during the Surge of 2007.

The unit features multiple personnel whose actions under fire remained largely unrecorded for decades. Within the Indiana Army National Guard, it ranks second only to Company D Rangers as the most decorated and combat-experienced company-sized element since World War II.

=== Operation Spartan Shield ===
The 38th Division Headquarters and Headquarters Battalion (DHHB) mobilized over 600 Soldiers in May 2019 for rotational assignment in Operation Spartan Shield (OSS), to include a departure ceremony at the Indianapolis 500 race prior to mobilization. The 38th Infantry Division Headquarters replaced 34th Infantry Division Headquarters in July 2019, and was primarily based out of Kuwait, but also had a tactical command post (TAC) in Jordan as well as Eskan Village, Kingdom of Saudi Arabia. Soldiers of the 38th Infantry Division conducted multiple engagements and exercises with military partners in the Persian Gulf. As well, the Division deterred aggression in the Persian Gulf and in support of Combined Joint Task Force - Operation Inherent Resolve (CJTF-OIR) in both Iraq and Syria. 38th Infantry Division headquarters was awarded a Meritorious Unit Commendation for this deployment.

=== 59th Presidential Inauguration ===
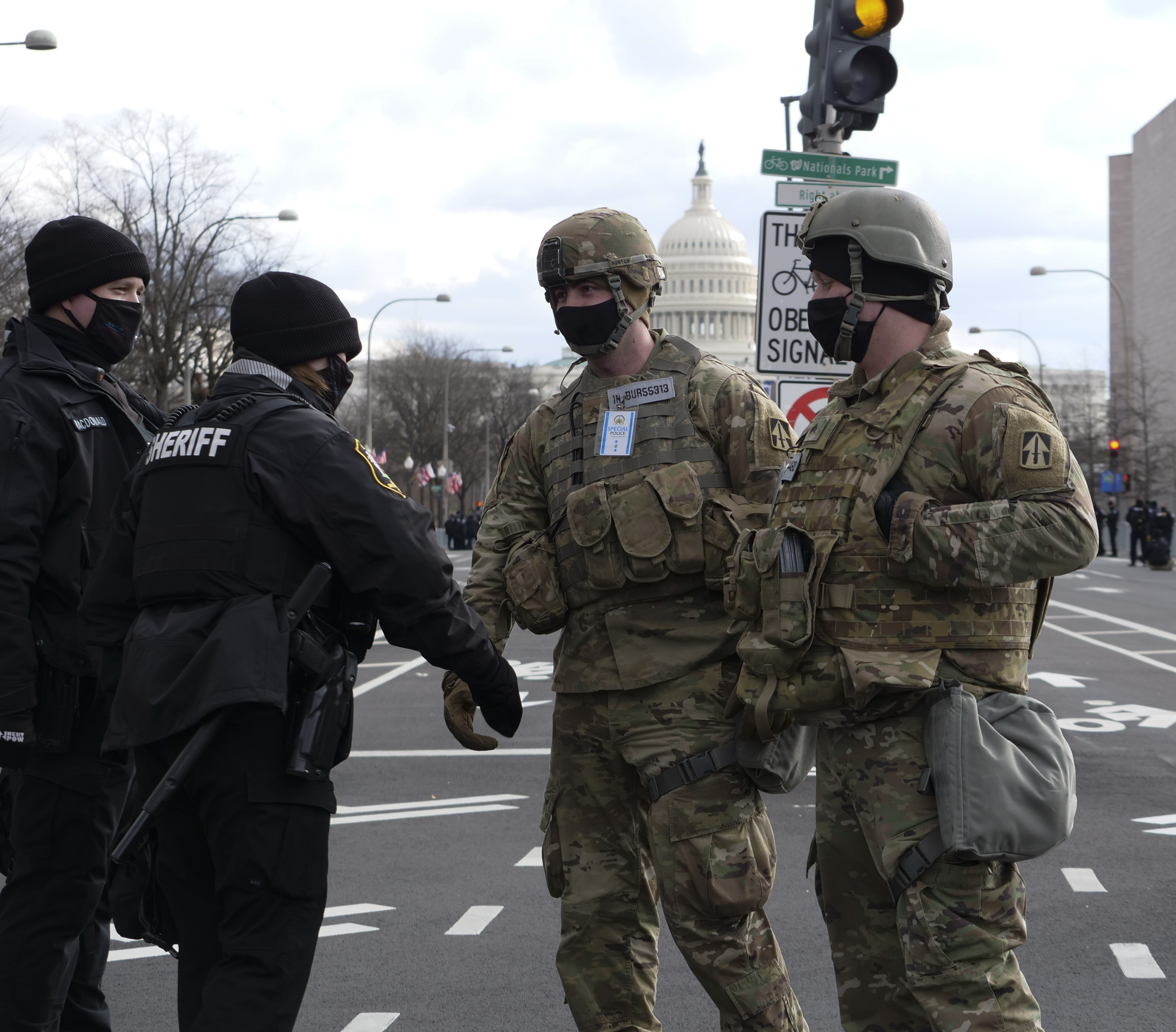
38th Infantry Division Soldiers in Washington D.C. after the January 6th attack on the Capitol

At least 25,000 National Guard men and women were activated to assist with the security of Washington D.C. in the days after the 2021 United States Capitol attack. Hundreds of 38th Infantry Division Soldiers were present during the inauguration of Joe Biden on January 20, 2021.

== Division organization in 2026 ==
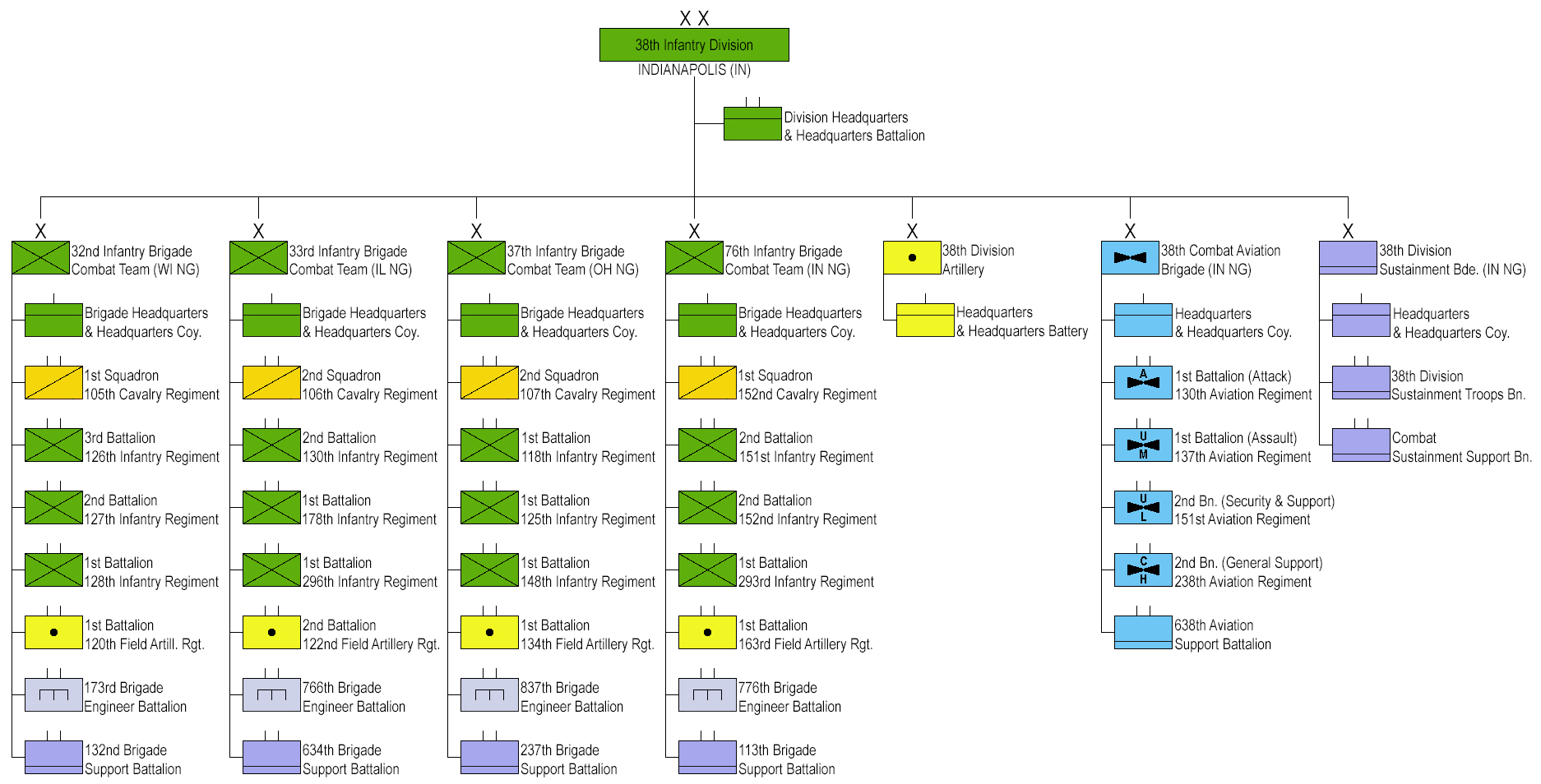
38th Infantry Division organization October 2026 (click to enlarge)

38th Infantry Division exercises command and control of four Army National Guard brigades within Indiana — one infantry brigade combat team, engineer brigade, sustainment brigade, and a combat aviation brigade—and maintains an alignment for training with four Army National Guard brigades outside of Indiana, specifically, a maneuver enhancement brigade, the division artillery brigade, two infantry brigade combat teams, and elements of the newly formed Company C, 2nd Battalion (Airborne), 134th Infantry Regiment. There are units from Kentucky, Illinois, Michigan, Ohio, Indiana, and other states.

- 38th Infantry Division, at Stout Field (IN)
  - Headquarters and Headquarters Battalion, 38th Infantry Division, at Stout Field (IN)
    - Headquarters Support Company, 38th Infantry Division, at Stout Field (IN)
      - Detachment 1, Headquarters Support Company, 38th Infantry Division, in Columbus (OH) — (Ohio Army National Guard)
    - Company A (Operations), Headquarters and Headquarters Battalion, 38th Infantry Division, at Stout Field (IN)
    - Company B (Intelligence and Sustainment), Headquarters and Headquarters Battalion, 38th Infantry Division, at Stout Field (IN)
    - Company C (Signal), Headquarters and Headquarters Battalion, 38th Infantry Division, in Anderson (IN)
    - 38th Infantry Division Band, at Stout Field (IN)
    - Detachment 3, 909th Quartermaster Platoon (Field Feeding), at Stout Field (IN)
  - 32nd Infantry Brigade Combat Team, at Camp Williams (WI) — (Wisconsin Army National Guard)
    - Headquarters and Headquarters Company, 32nd Infantry Brigade Combat Team, at Camp Williams (WI)
    - 1st Squadron, 105th Cavalry Regiment, in Madison (WI)
    - 3rd Battalion, 126th Infantry Regiment, in Wyoming (MI) — (Michigan National Guard)
    - 2nd Battalion, 127th Infantry Regiment, in Appleton (WI)
    - 1st Battalion, 128th Infantry Regiment, in Eau Claire (WI)
    - 1st Battalion, 120th Field Artillery Regiment, in Wisconsin Rapids (WI)
    - 173rd Brigade Engineer Battalion, in Wausau (WI)
    - 132nd Brigade Support Battalion, in Portage (WI)
  - 33rd Infantry Brigade Combat Team, in Urbana (IL) — (Illinois Army National Guard)
    - Headquarters and Headquarters Company, 33rd Infantry Brigade Combat Team, in Urbana (IL)
    - 2nd Squadron, 106th Cavalry Regiment, in Kewanee (IL)
    - 2nd Battalion, 130th Infantry Regiment, in Marion (IL)
    - 1st Battalion, 178th Infantry Regiment, in Chicago (IL)
    - 1st Battalion, 296th Infantry Regiment, in Mayagüez (PR) — (Puerto Rico Army National Guard)
    - 2nd Battalion, 122nd Field Artillery Regiment, in Chicago (IL)
    - 766th Brigade Engineer Battalion, in Decatur (IL)
    - 634th Brigade Support Battalion, in Sullivan (IL)
  - 37th Infantry Brigade Combat Team, in Columbus (OH) — (Ohio Army National Guard)
    - Headquarters and Headquarters Company, 37th Infantry Brigade Combat Team, in Columbus (OH)
    - 2nd Squadron, 107th Cavalry Regiment, in Hamilton (OH)
    - 1st Battalion, 118th Infantry Regiment, in Mount Pleasant (SC) — (South Carolina Army National Guard)
    - 1st Battalion, 125th Infantry Regiment, in Saginaw (MI) — (Michigan Army National Guard)
    - 1st Battalion, 148th Infantry Regiment, in Walbridge (OH)
    - 1st Battalion, 134th Field Artillery Regiment, in Delaware (OH)
    - 837th Brigade Engineer Battalion, in Springfield (OH)
    - 237th Brigade Support Battalion, in Cleveland (OH)
  - 76th Mobile Brigade Combat Team, in Lawrence (IN) — (Indiana Army National Guard)
    - Headquarters and Headquarters Company, 76th Mobile Brigade Combat Team, in Lawrence (IN)
    - 1st Squadron, 152nd Cavalry Regiment, in New Albany (IN)
    - 1st Battalion, 151st Infantry Regiment, in Columbus (IN)
    - 2nd Battalion, 151st Infantry Regiment, in South Bend (IN)
    - 1st Battalion, 293rd Infantry Regiment, in Fort Wayne (IN)
    - 1st Battalion, 163rd Field Artillery Regiment, in Evansville (IN)
    - 776th Brigade Engineer Battalion, in Lawrence (IN)
    - 113th Light Support Battalion, in Muncie (IN)
  - 38th Division Artillery, at Bowman Field (KY) — (Kentucky Army National Guard)
    - Headquarters and Headquarters Battery, 38th Division Artillery, at Bowman Field (KY)
    - 1st Battalion, 623rd Field Artillery Regiment (M142 HIMARS), in Glasgow (KY)
    - 2nd Battalion, 138th Field Artillery Regiment (M109A6 PALADIN), in Lexington (KY)
    - 103rd Brigade Support Battalion, in Harrodsburg (KY)
  - 38th Combat Aviation Brigade, at Shelbyville Airport (IN) — (Indiana Army National Guard)
    - Headquarters and Headquarters Company, 38th Combat Aviation Brigade, at Shelbyville Airport (IN)
    - 1st Battalion (Assault), 137th Aviation Regiment, at Rickenbacker International Airport (OH) — (Ohio Army National Guard)
    - 2nd Battalion (Security & Support), 151st Aviation Regiment, at Donaldson Center Airport (SC) — (South Carolina Army National Guard)
    - 2nd Battalion (General Support Aviation), 238th Aviation Regiment, at Shelbyville Airport (IN)
    - 638th Aviation Support Battalion, in Lafayette (IN)
  - 38th Division Sustainment Brigade, in Kokomo (IN) — (Indiana Army National Guard)
    - 38th Division Sustainment Troops Battalion, in Kokomo (IN)
    - 519th Division Sustainment Support Battalion, in Terre Haute (IN)

Attached units:

- 219th Engineer Brigade — (Indiana Army National Guard)

== Insignia ==
The division's shoulder sleeve insignia (SSI) is a spade shaped shield, bordered in green, with the right half red, the left half blue. Superimposed on the shield is a white monogram "CY" which alludes to the divisional nickname "the Cyclone Division." The distinctive unit insignia (DUI) is in the shape of a clover leaf in memory of the original badge for non-color bearing divisional units. The lightning flashes represent the unit's participation in three World War II campaigns, with the Luzon assault landing recognized by the arrowhead tip in the center flash. The cloud and lightning flashes are an allusion to the cyclone. The colors blue, white and red refer to the Philippine Presidential Unit Citation awarded to the unit for their part in liberating the country.

== See also ==
- Philippines campaign (1944–45)
