= 152nd Cavalry Regiment =

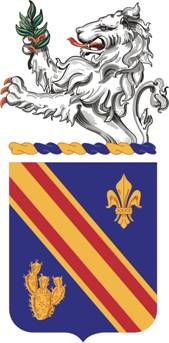
- Coat of arms
- Active: 1846–47; 1861–65; 1882–1919; 1921–45; 1947–
- Country: United States
- Branch: United States Army; United States National Guard
- Type: Cavalry
- Part of: 76th Infantry Brigade Combat Team; 38th Infantry Division
- Engagements: Mexican-American War; American Civil War; World War I World War II; Iraq War
- Website: http://in.ng.mil

The 152nd Cavalry Regiment is a cavalry regiment in the Indiana Army National Guard. Elements are active as part of the 76th Infantry Brigade Combat Team. Prior to 2007, the unit was known as the 152nd Infantry Regiment.

== History ==
=== Mexican-American War ===
On 24 June 1846, the 2nd Regiment of Indiana Volunteers was organized as part of the Indiana Brigade with named independent companies mustered as follows: Johnson County Guards; Brown County Blues; Shelby Rifles; Monroe Guards; Bartholomew Guards; Dearborn Volunteers; Switzerland Riflemen; Washington Guards; Madison Rifles; Clark Guards. The 2nd Indiana Volunteers were mustered into federal service on 26 June 1846 at New Albany, Indiana, and mustered out of federal service from 24 to 27 June 1847 at New Orleans, Louisiana. The unit was subsequently reorganized as independent companies in Indiana.

=== American Civil War ===
After the outbreak of the American Civil War in 1861, independent companies in southern Indiana were organized as part of the 6th and 8th Indiana Volunteer Infantry Regiments, and were mustered into federal service as three-month units from 22 to 26 April 1861, and mustered out of service on 2–6 August 1861 at Indianapolis. The regiments were reorganized as three-year units and were mustered back into federal service on 5 September 1861 (8th Indiana) and 20 September 1861 (6th Indiana). The 6th Indiana was mustered out of federal service on 22 September 1864, and the 8th Indiana was mustered out of federal service on 28 August 1865.

=== 1882–1917 ===
On 12 June 1882, the 1st Regiment, Indiana Volunteers, was organized in the Indiana Legion from independent named companies located as follows: Hager Veterans Terre Haute); South Bend Veterans (South Bend); Tippecanoe Veterans (Tippecanoe); Phil Kearney Veterans (Covington); Old Wayne Veterans (Richmond); Howard Veterans (Kokomo); Elkhart Veteran Guards (Elkhart); Carroll Veterans (Delphi). The Jennings County Veterans (North Vernon) were incorporated into the regiment in October 1882. In 1892, the regiment was reorganized as the 2nd Regiment in the southern portion of the state by exchange of companies. On 5 March 1895, the Indiana Legion was redesignated the Indiana National Guard.

==== Spanish-American War and Mexican Expedition ====
The 2nd Indiana was mustered into federal service on 10 May 1898 and redesignated the 158th Indiana Volunteer Infantry. It was mustered out of federal service on 4 November 1898 at Camp Mount, Indiana, not having served outside the continental United States. The 2nd Indiana was reorganized in the Indiana National Guard on 20 July 1900 in central Indiana from companies located in Indianapolis, Muncie, Newcastle, Union City, Franklin, Lebanon, and Danville. The regiment was mustered into federal service from 28 June-9 July 1916 for service on the Mexican border and mustered out of federal service from 21 to 26 February 1917.

=== World War I ===
The 2nd Infantry, Indiana National Guard, was called into federal service 25 March 1917, and mustered into federal service 20 April 1917 at Jeffersonville. Drafted into federal service 5 August 1917. It was reorganized and redesignated 1 October 1917 as the 152d Infantry and assigned to the 38th Division.

=== Interwar period ===
The 152nd Infantry was demobilized on 8 March 1919 at Camp Zachary Taylor, Kentucky. Per the National Defense Act of 1920, it was reconstituted in the National Guard in 1921, assigned to the 38th Division, and allotted to the state of Indiana. It was reorganized on 15 November 1921, with the regimental headquarters organized and federally recognized at Indianapolis, Indiana. The former 137th Field Artillery Regiment was consolidated with the regiment during the reorganization and redesignated the 3rd Battalion. The regimental headquarters successively relocated to Fort Wayne, Indiana, on 13 February 1932, and back to Indianapolis on 19 April 1938. The regiment, or elements thereof, was called up to perform the following state duties: tornado relief in southern Indiana in 1925; riot control during labor troubles in Vanderburg and Warrick Counties, 22 February–1923 March 1926; 3rd Battalion for riot control during race troubles due to a lynching in Marion, Indiana, 9–11 August 1930; two companies for riot control during a coal miners’ strike at Sullivan County, 9 October–15 November 1931; entire regiment for riot control during a coal miners’ strike at the Dixie Bee Mine near Terre Haute, Indiana, 2 August–October 1932; 1st Battalion for guard and security duties in connection with the visit of President Roosevelt to Vincennes, Indiana, 14 June 1936; entire regiment for flood relief along the Ohio River, January–March 1937. Conducted annual summer training most years at Camp Knox, Kentucky, 1921–39.

=== World War II ===
Inducted into federal service 17 January 1941, the 152nd Infantry Regiment conducted basic training at Camp Shelby, Mississippi with additional training at Camp Carrabelle, Florida, Camp Livingston, Louisiana and Hawaii.

Bataan peninsula on the island of Luzon, Philippines.

==== Battle of Baatan (1945) ====
===== Background =====
In January 1942, the Imperial Japanese Army and Navy invaded Luzon, the largest island in the Philippines. Shortly after the invasion, General Douglas MacArthur consolidated all his Luzon-based units on to the Bataan peninsula in an effort to make a last stand and delay the Japanese invasion of the rest Asia Pacific. After nearly three months of fighting, more than 10,000 American and Filipino forces were killed and 76,000 were imprisoned. The captured prisoners were then forcibly marched more than 60 miles through the jungle to various POW camps in an event known as the Bataan Death March. Deaths from the march range from 5,650 and 18,000.

===== The Recapture of Bataan =====
In January 1945, the 38th and 24th Infantry Divisions were ordered to clear Japanese forces from the Bataan peninsula.

The 34th Infantry Regiment reinforced the front lines held by Filipino guerrilla fighters at the northern base of the Bataan peninsula, allowing the 149th, 151st and 152nd Infantry Regiments to move south and east into the peninsula.

On 1 February, the 152nd Infantry Regiment approached Japanese strong-points at "Horseshoe Bend." After two days of heavy fighting, resulting in high casualties for the regiment, all eastward progress had stopped.

The 34th Infantry then reinforced the 152nd Infantry and after more than two weeks of hard fighting the 149th, 152nd Infantry Regiments finally linked up clearing the peninsula of Japanese forces.

The recapture of the Bataan peninsula enabled American forces full use of Manila Bay and its world-class deep water port. This development subsequently allowed the easy resupply of American forces retaking Manila. The operation was so significant that General Douglas MacArthur personally dubbed the soldiers of the 38th Infantry Division as the “Avengers of Bataan.”

=== Post-WWII ===
The 152nd Infantry was reorganized (less the 3rd Battalion) and federally recognized on 23 May 1947 with headquarters at Evansville. The 3rd Battalion (former 137th Field Artillery) was reorganized and federally recognized on 30 December 1947 as the 293rd Infantry hereafter separate lineage. The 152nd Infantry was reorganized on 1 February 1959 as a parent regiment under the Combat Arms Regimental System to consist of the 1st and 2nd Battle Groups, elements of the 38th Infantry Division.

Reorganized 1 March 1963

- Headquarters/Headquarters Company – New Albany, Indiana
- Alpha Company – New Albany, Indiana
- Bravo Company – Tell City, Indiana
- Charlie Company – Salem, Indiana

Reorganized 1 November 1965 as follows: 2nd Battalion (Mechanized), 152nd Infantry Regiment to consist of HHC (-) (Shelbyville), HHC (Greensburg), Co A (-) (Seymour), Co A (Connersville), Co B (-) (Martinsville), Co B (Columbus), Co C (-) (Salem), Co C (Scottsburg). 1st Battalion, 152nd Infantry Regiment to consist of HHC (Jasper), HHC (Jasper), Co A (Vincennes), Co B (Linton), Co C (Tell City), Co D (Washington).

2nd Battalion reorganized 1 December 1967 to consist of HHC (Shelbyville), Co A (-) (Richmond), Co A (Connersville), Co B (Martinsville), Co C (New Castle).

2nd Battalion reorganized and redesignated 1 February 1972 with Co A (-) (Richmond) and Co A as Spt Co (Connersville). 1st Battalion, 152nd Infantry Regiment to consist of headquarters (Jasper), HHC (Jasper), Co A (Vincennes), Co B (Linton), Co C (Tell City), Co D (Washington).

Location of Headquarters 2nd Battalion 152nd Infantry (Mechanized) changed 1 March 1977 to Camp Atterbury; on 1 November 1979 to Columbus.

2nd Battalion reorganized and redesignated 1 September 1987 with Spt as Co E (AA) (Connersville) and organized Co D (Connersville)

Reorganized and redesignated 1 April 1995, with the location of the 2nd Battalion headquarters changed to Marion, Indiana; HHC (Marion), Co A (Warsaw), Co B (Winchester), Co C (New Castle), Co D (Muncie), Co E (Connersville). 1st Battalion, 152nd Infantry Regiment to consist of headquarters (Jasper), HHC (Jasper), Co A (-) (Linton), Det 1, Co A (Vincennes), Co B (Martinsville), Co C (Tell City), Co D (Washington).

Al-Anbar province, Iraq.

=== Iraq War ===
In late 2002, the 76th Infantry Brigade mobilized two battalions to provide support for an escalating campaign in the Middle East. The 1st Battalion, 152nd Infantry, "Predators," mobilized at Camp Atterbury, Indiana, on 2 January 2003 and deployed to Kuwait in mid-February 2003. On D+5, the 1st Battalion, 293rd Infantry Regiment, was called on to move north to support Operation Iraqi Freedom (with the temporary attachment of Company A, 1st Battalion, 152nd Infantry), to the vicinity of Tallil Air Base near the city of An Nasiriyah, Iraq. The 1st Battalion, 152nd Infantry, employed companies in Baghdad (initially in support of the 5th Special Forces Group), Forward Operating Base Kalsu (approximately 30 miles south of Baghdad in the "Sunni Triangle"), and Convoy Service Center Scania, both of which were along Main Supply Route (MSR) Tampa. In January 2004, the 1st Battalion 152nd Infantry was replaced by the 2nd Battalion, 505th Parachute Infantry Regiment, and returned to Indiana in February 2004.

From October 2006 to September 2007, Headquarters and Headquarters Company "Team Gator", 2nd Battalion, 152nd Infantry Regiment was operationally assigned as an expeditionary force attached to the 1st Brigade Combat Team, 1st Armored Division, with one platoon assigned under the tactical control of United States Marine Corps Regimental Combat Teams.

Team Gator conducted extensive joint combat patrols and enemy clearing operations in both the Ramadi and Fallujah Area of Operation during some of the most intense fighting of the Iraq campaign.

When 1st Brigade Combat Team, 1st Armored Division departed Ramadi, Team Gator would be assigned to the 1st Brigade Combat Team, 3rd Infantry Division (United States) and would participate in major clearing operations during the Iraq War troop surge of 2007.

Team Gator opened eight new police stations in Al Anbar Province, including Ramadi and Fallujah; participated in eight battalion-sized enemy clearing operations; conducted hundreds of joint patrols with Iraqi Security Forces, and killed or captured more than 100 enemy insurgents. Soldiers in Team Gator received 34 Purple Hearts, 27 Bronze Star Medals (two valor device). The company received the Naval Unit Commendation and the Meritorious Unit Commendation. Team Gator suffered one soldier killed in action, SSG Bradley D. King, killed on 2 April 2007 by an improvised explosive device during a raid on a known bomb maker's house in the village of Fuhaylat.

== Current structure ==
- Headquarters and Headquarters Troop (HHT), 1-152nd Cavalry Squadron – New Albany
  - Detachment 5, Headquarters and Headquarters Battalion, 1-163rd Field Artillery – New Albany
  - Troop A, 1-152nd Cavalry Squadron – Madison
  - Troop B, 1-152nd Cavalry Squadron – Connersville
  - Troop C, 1-152nd Cavalry Squadron – Salem
  - Company D, 113th Brigade Support Battalion – Scottsburg

== Campaign streamers and decorations ==
- Philippine Presidential Unit Citation embroidered 17 October 1944 to 4 July 1945 (Department of the Army General Orders Number 47, 1950)

=== Mexican-American War ===
- Buena Vista

=== American Civil War ===
- West Virginia 1861
- Alabama 1862
- Arkansas 1862
- Mississippi 1862
- Tennessee 1862, 1863
- Missouri 1862, 1863
- Murfreesboro
- Vicksburg
- Chickamauga
- Chattanooga
- Louisiana 1863, 1864
- Atlanta
- Virginia 1864
- Georgia 1864, 1865

=== World War I ===
- Without inscription

=== World War II ===
- New Guinea
- Leyte
- Luzon
