= 151st Infantry Regiment (United States) =

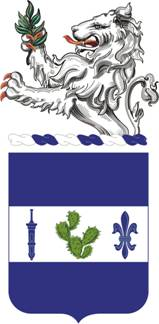
- Coat of arms
- Active: 1817
- Country: United States
- Branch: United States Army
- Type: Infantry
- Size: Regiment
- Garrison/HQ: Indianapolis, Indiana
- Motto: "Wide Awake! Wide Awake!"
- Engagements: Battle of Tippecanoe; Mexican–American War; American Civil War; Spanish–American War; Mexican Border Campaign; World War I World War II; Vietnam War; Operation Iraqi Freedom; Operation Enduring Freedom
- Decorations: Presidential Unit Citation Valorous Unit Award Meritorious Unit Commendation Philippine Presidential Unit Citation

Insignia
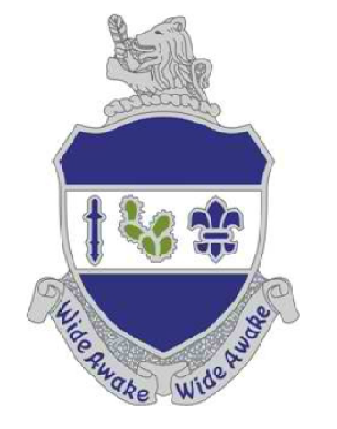
- Distinctive unit insignia

The 151st Infantry Regiment is an infantry unit in the Indiana National Guard, part of the 76th Mobile Brigade Combat Team.

== History ==
=== Territorial militia ===
The 151st Infantry Regiment traces its roots to the Indiana Territory Indiana Rangers militia. It was in the 1811 Battle of Tippecanoe that it earned its motto "Wide Awake! Wide Awake!"

=== Mexican-American War, Civil War and Spanish-American War ===
In 1846, the 2nd Regiment, Indiana Volunteers, Indiana Brigade was mustered into federal service for the Mexican–American War, and was again federalized in 1861 during the American Civil War. It was reorganized in 1882 as part of the Indiana Legion, which was renamed the Indiana National Guard on 5 March 1895. The 151st Infantry Regiment is credited with 24 campaigns from the Civil War, from lineage traced to the 7th, 10th, and 11th Indiana Volunteer Infantry Regiments. The regiment was again federalized in 1898 for service in the Spanish–American War. In 1900, it was reorganized as the First Infantry, Indiana National Guard. The First Infantry was mustered into federal service at Fort Benjamin Harrison in 1916 for service in the Mexican Border Campaign.

=== World War I ===
With the outbreak of World War I, the First Infantry was reorganized into the 151st Infantry Regiment, and assigned to the 76th Infantry Brigade, 38th Division. The division was mobilized for federal service in 1917 and demobilized in 1919.

=== Interwar period ===
The 151st Infantry was demobilized on 8 March 1919 at Camp Zachary Taylor, Kentucky. Per the National Defense Act of 1920, the 151st Infantry was reconstituted in the National Guard in 1921, assigned to the 38th Division, and allotted to the state of Indiana. It was reorganized on 30 June 1921 with the regimental headquarters organized and federally recognized at Shelbyville, Indiana. The headquarters was successively relocated as follows: to Indianapolis, Indiana, 13 December 1932; to Jonesboro, Indiana, 1 June 1933; and back to Indianapolis on 23 September 1933. The regiment, or elements thereof, called up to perform the following state duties: riot control during a coal miners’ strike at Staunton—Jasonville, Indiana, 2–19 August 1922; 1st Battalion called up to perform riot control during labor troubles in Vanderburg and Warwick Counties, 22 February–23 March 1926; riot control during a coal miners’ strike at the Hoosier Mine in Sullivan County, 21–25 July 1931; entire regiment called up to perform riot control during a coal miners’ strike at the Dixie Bee Mine near Terre Haute, Indiana, 2 August–October 1932; riot control during a coal miners’ strike at the Starburn Mine, Sullivan County, 9–23 October 1933; six Indiana National Guard companies for guard and security duties in connection with the visit of President Franklin D. Roosevelt to Vincennes, Indiana, 14 June 1936; entire regiment called up to perform flood relief along the Ohio River at Aurora, Indiana, in January–March 1937. Conducted annual summer training most years at Camp Knox, Kentucky, 1921–39.

=== World War II ===
The 38th Division was again activated in 1941 in preparation for World War II. In the South Pacific, the 151st Regiment earned three battle streamers (New Guinea, Leyte and Luzon) helping the 38th Infantry Division win the nickname "Avengers of Bataan."

=== Co. D (Ranger), 151st Infantry during the Vietnam War ===
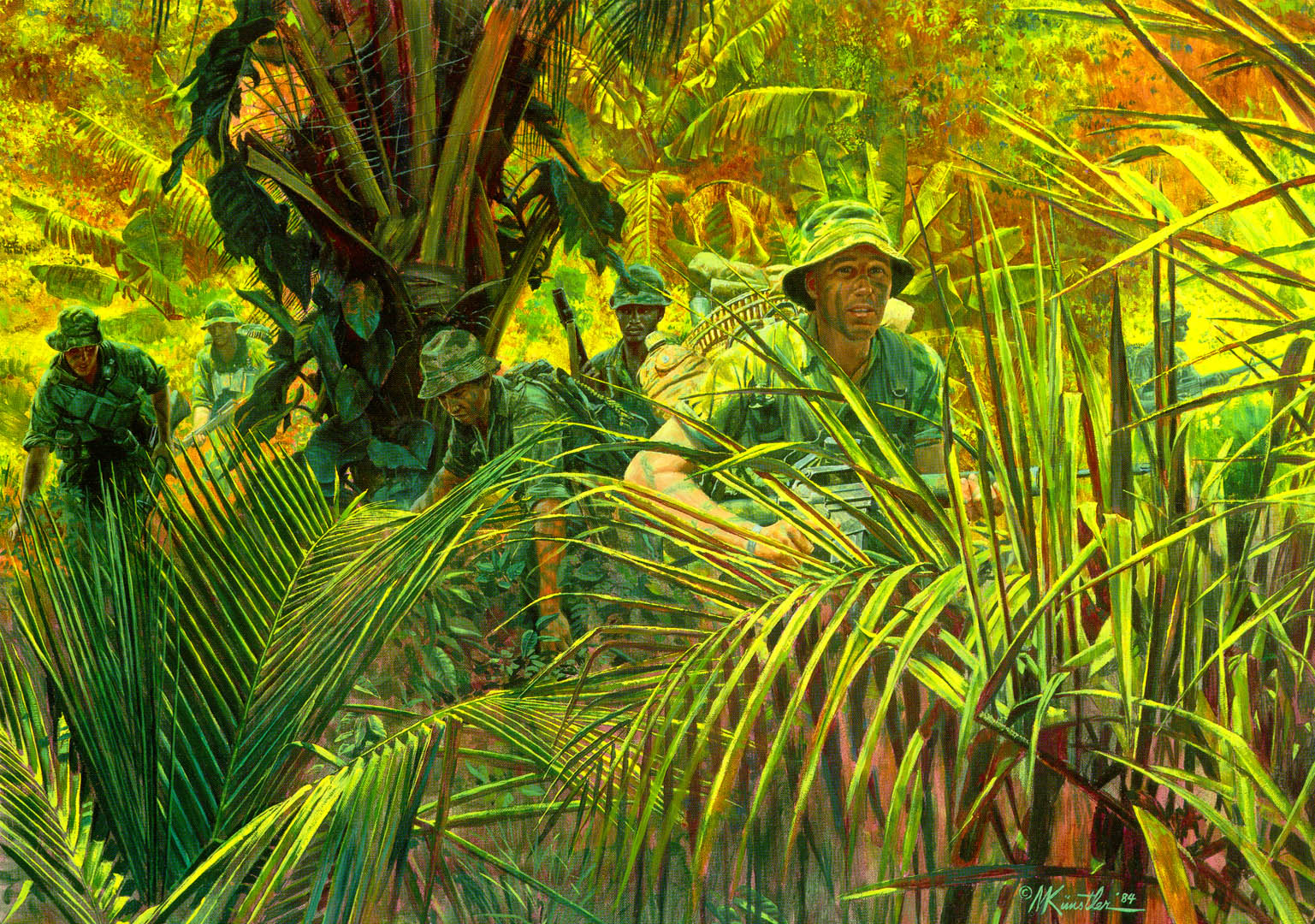
Company D (Ranger), 151st Infantry Regiment on patrol in Vietnam (from United States Army Center of Military History

Elements of the 151st Regiment served in the Vietnam War; Company D (Ranger), "Delta Company," was the only National Guard infantry unit to serve in Vietnam intact, and earned more medals in 1969 than any other Army infantry company during a 1-year period, and has been credited with reintegrating National Guard units with the United States Army after they were intentionally separated during the Vietnam War. The company was eventually assigned to II Field Force Vietnam with the mission of conducting long range patrols in War Zone D, in the III Corps Tactical Zone. After the company's arrival, the 199th Infantry Brigade (Light) oversaw its initial administration and support.

=== 151st Infantry Regiment Post-Vietnam War ===
In 1977, the regiment was organized into two battalions, elements of the 38th Infantry Division. Both the 1st Battalion (1-151 IN) and 2nd Battalion (2-151 IN) are elements of the 76th Infantry Brigade Combat Team (Separate), Elements of the 151st have deployed to Bosnia (NATO SFOR), Iraq Operation Iraqi Freedom and Afghanistan Operation Enduring Freedom. During deployment to Afghanistan in 2009-2010, personnel from Bravo company of 2nd Bn, 151st Inf received the Meritorious Unit Citation due to augmenting Task Force Yukon (4th IBCT (Airborne)) from 2009 to early 2010. All personnel returned to Bravo Company and the unit was awarded the Valorous Unit Award while attached to Task Force Rakkasan (3d Bde, 101st Airborne Division), as part of Regional Command East, International Security Assistance Force (ISAF) conducting counterinsurgency operations in Khost province until June 2010. The two battalions reunited in 2011 to commemorate the 200th anniversary of the Battle of Tippecanoe.

== 151st Infantry Regiment Lineage ==
Organized 24 June 1846 from existing companies as the 2d Regiment, Indiana Volunteers, Indiana Brigade

Mustered into Federal service 26 June 1846 at New Albany; mustered out of Federal service 21–28 June 1847 at New Orleans, Louisiana, and elements reorganized as independent companies in Indiana

Companies in central and southern Indiana consolidated and mustered into Federal service 21-27 April 1861 at Indianapolis as the 7th, 10th, and 11th Indiana Volunteer Infantry Regiments; mustered out of Federal service 2 August 1861 at Indianapolis

After 2 August 1861 the above units underwent changes as follows: 7th Regiment reorganized and mustered into Federal service 13 September 1861 at Indianapolis

Mustered out of Federal service 19 September 1864 at Indianapolis 10th Regiment reorganized and mustered into Federal service 18 September 1861 at Indianapolis

Mustered out of Federal service 19 September 1864 at Indianapolis 11 th Regiment reorganized and mustered into Federal service 31 August 1861 at Indianapolis

Mustered out of Federal service 26 July 1865 at Baltimore, Maryland Reorganized 12 June 1882 in the Indiana Legion from existing companies as the 1st Regiment (Indiana Legion redesignated 5 March 1895 as the Indiana National Guard)

Mustered into Federal service 12 May 1898 at Indianapolis as the 159th Indiana Volunteer Infantry; mustered out of Federal service 23 November 1898 at Indianapolis

Reorganized 20 July 1900 in the Indiana National Guard as the 1st Infantry

Mustered into Federal service 27 June-9 July 1916 at Fort Benjamin Harrison, Indiana; mustered out of Federal service 14 March 1917 at Fort Benjamin Harrison, Indiana

Drafted into Federal service 5 August 1917

Reorganized and redesignated 1 October 1917 as the 151st Infantry and assigned to the 38th Division

Demobilized 8 March 1919 at Camp Zachary Taylor, Kentucky

Reorganized in 1921 in the Indiana National Guard as the 151st Infantry and assigned to the 38th Division (later redesignated as the 38th Infantry Division); Headquarters Federally recognized 30 June 1921 at Shelbyville

(Location of Headquarters changed 13 December 1932 to Indianapolis; on 1 June 1933 to Jonesboro; and on 23 September 1933 to Indianapolis)

Inducted into Federal service 17 January 1941 at home stations

Inactivated 9 November 1945 at Camp Anza, California

Reorganized and Federally recognized 29 July 1947 with Headquarters at Indianapolis

Reorganized 1 February 1959 as a parent regiment under the Combat Arms Regimental System to consist of the 1st Battle Group, an element of the 38th Infantry Division

Reorganized 1 March 1963 to consist of the 1st and 2d Battalions, elements of the 38th Infantry Division

Reorganized 1 December 1967 to consist of the 1st Battalion and Company D, elements of the 38th Infantry Division

(Company D ordered into active Federal service 13 May 1968 at Greenfield; released 26 November 1969 from active Federal service and reverted to state control)

Reorganized 1 February 1972 to consist of the 1st Battaiion and Company D

Reorganized 1 March 1977 to consist of the Ist and 2d Battalions, elements of the 38th Infantry Division

Withdrawn 1 November 1986 from the Combat Arms Regimental System and reorganized under the United States Army Regimental System

Reorganized 1 September 1994 to consist of the 1st Battalion, an element of the 76th Infantry Brigade, and the 2d Battalion, an element of the 38th Infantry Division

== Co. D (Ranger), 151st Infantry Lineage ==
Organized and Federally recognized 9 December 1940 in the Indiana National Guard at Indianapolis as the Antitank Company, 151st Infantry, an element of the 38th Division (later redesignated as the 38th Infantry Division)

Inducted into active Federal service 17 January 1941 at Indianapolis

Inactivated 9 November 1945 at Camp Anza, California

Reorganized and Federally recognized 11 April 1949 at Greenfield as the Tank Company, 151st Infantry

Reorganized and redesignated 1 February 1959 as the Combat Support Company, 1st Battle Group, 151st Infantry

Reorganized and redesignated 1 March 1963 as Company B, 2d Battalion, 151st Infantry

Reorganized and redesignated 1 December 1967 as Company D, 151st Infantry, and relieved from assignment to the 38th Infantry Division

Ordered into active Federal service 13 May 1968 at Greenfield; released from active Federal service 26 November 1969 and reverted to state control

Consolidated 1 April 1971 with Company E, 151st Infantry (organized and Federally recognized 1 December 1967 at Muncie), and consolidated unit designated as Company D, 151st Infantry, at Muncie

Converted and redesignated 1 March 1977 as Troop A, 1st Squadron, 238th Cavalry, an element of the 38th Infantry Division

Reorganized and redesignated 3 October 1986 as the Long Range Surveillance Detachment, 1st Squadron, 238th Cavalry

Converted and redesignated 1 October 1989 as the 151st Infantry Detachment

Location changed 1 September 1990 to Indianapolis; on 1 September 1996 to Darlington

                                            CAMPAIGN PARTICIPATION CREDIT

Mexican War

Buena Vista

Civil War

Henry and Donelson

Shiloh

Manassas

Antietam

Fredericksburg

Chancellorsville

Gettysburg

Vicksburg

Chickamauga

Chattanooga

Wilderness

Atlanta

Spotsylvania

Cold Harbor

Petersburg

Shenandoah

Virginia 1861

Virginia 1862

Virginia 1863

Arkansas 1862

Kentucky 1862

Mississippi 1862

Mississippi 1863

Louisiana 1863

World War 1

Streamer without inscription

World War II

New Guinea

Leyte

Luzon (with arrowhead)

Vietnam

*earned by Company D (Ranger), 151st Infantry

Counteroffensive, Phase VI

Tet 69/Counteroffensive

Summer-Fall 1969

Winter-Spring 1970

War on Terrorism

Iraq:

National Resolution

Iraqi Surge

1st Battalion additionally entitled to:

Global War on Terrorism Iraq:

Liberation of Iraq

Transition of Iraq

Company B (Logansport), 2nd Battalion additionally entitled to:

War on Terrorism

Campaigns to be determined

                                                       DECORATIONS

Meritorious Unit Commendation (Army), Streamer embroidered IRAQ 2008 (earned by the 1st Battalion)

Philippine Presidential Unit Citation, Streamer embroidered 17 OCTOBER 1944 TO 4 JULY 1945

Company B (Logansport), 2d Battalion additionally entitled to:

Valorous Unit Award, Streamer embroidered EASTERN AFGHANISTAN APR- AUG 2010
