= 76th Mobile Brigade Combat Team =

Indiana Army National Guard

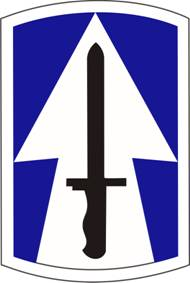
- 76th Mobile Brigade Combat Team Shoulder sleeve insignia
- Active: 5 August 1917–6 July 1919 (113th Supply Train, 38th Division); 1921–29 April 1945 (various designations); 1 November 1965–24 April 24 2008 (76th Infantry Bge.); 24 April 24 2008–16 October 2025 (76th IBCT); 16 October 2025–present (76th MBCT)
- Country: United States
- Allegiance: Indiana National Guard
- Branch: United States Army National Guard
- Type: Infantry
- Size: Brigade
- Part of: 38th Infantry Division
- Nickname: Night Hawks (special designation)
- Motto: Point The Way
- Engagements: World War I; World War II; Tunisia; Sicily; Naples-Foggia; Rome-Arno; Southern France with arrowhead; Northern France; Rhineland; Ardennes-Alsace; Central Europe; Global War on Terrorism; Afghanistan; Iraq; Operation Enduring Freedom; Operation Iraqi Freedom
- Decorations: Meritorious Unit Commendation with oak leaf cluster
- Website: Brigade website

Commanders
- Colonel: COL Benjamin Tooley
- Command Sergeant Major: CSM Steven King
- Notable commanders: Julius Penn; William G. Everson

Insignia
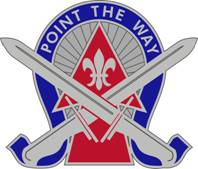
- 76th Infantry Brigade DUI

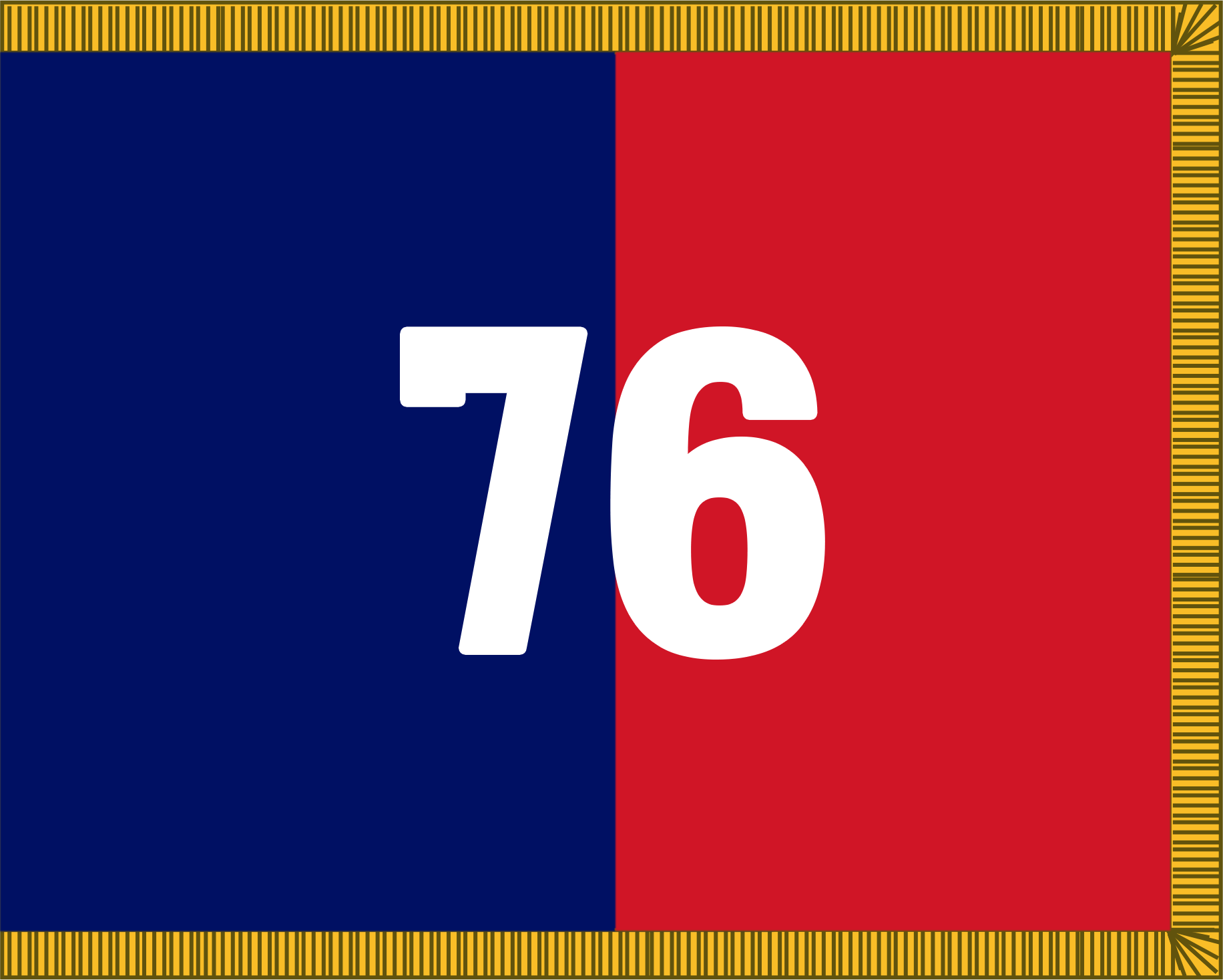
- 76th Infantry Brigade Flag

The 76th Mobile Brigade Combat Team ("Night Hawks") is a infantry brigade of the United States Army and the Indiana National Guard. It is headquartered in Lawrence Readiness Training Center, on the grounds of Fort Benjamin Harrison.

== History ==
During World War I, the United States Congress approved the formation of seventeen new National Guard divisions, numbered 26 through 42. The states of Indiana, Kentucky, and West Virginia were chosen to provide units for the 38th Infantry Division. Indiana's 151st and 152nd Infantry regiments formed the new 76th Infantry Brigade. One field artillery regiment from the 38th Division served in combat in France as part of the new 42nd (Rainbow) Division. The rest of the 38th Division arrived in France in October 1918 and Julius Penn was assigned to command the 76th Brigade. The division's organization and training were still in progress during the war's final offensive, so it was used to provide replacement soldiers for front line units.

The 38th Division was activated for federal service again in 1941, with the same organizational structure that had been used in World War I. However, in 1942, the Army reorganized its structure, and the 76th Brigade ceased to exist as an identifiable military organization.

On 1 March 1963, as part of the Army's Reorganization Objective Army Division (ROAD), the Headquarters and Headquarters Company of the 1st Brigade, 38th Infantry Division was born. Less than 20 months later, it was restored to its 1917 designation of 76th Infantry Brigade, known as the "Blue Devil" Brigade. Since the creation of the 76th Brigade at Indianapolis on 1 November 1965, the unit has moved to Columbus, to Camp Atterbury and to Bedford, with units located throughout southern Indiana.

Out of the ashes of the Blue Devil Brigade, the Nighthawk Brigade was formed. The 76th Infantry Brigade (Separate) was formed on 1 September 1994 at Indianapolis, Indiana this time with units located throughout the state of Indiana. The Nighthawk Brigade was selected to be one of the 15 enhanced brigades with a charter to achieve and maintain a higher state of readiness than previously expected of National Guard brigades. The unit relied heavily on the existing infantry regiments. The lineage of each combat regiment still in Indiana can be found within the brigade.

Under a plan approved by Army Chief of Staff General Eric K. Shinseki, in December 2000 the Army announced which active and reserve forces will see service in Bosnia and Kosovo through May 2005. Under the plan, units from the active Army and reserve forces supported the Stabilization Force mission, known as SFOR, in Bosnia or the Kosovo Force, known as KFOR, for six-month periods. SFOR 11 (April 2002 – October 2002) consists of the 116th Cavalry Brigade (enhanced separate brigade), Idaho Army National Guard; 76th Infantry Brigade (enhanced separate brigade), Indiana Army National Guard. Units from the 34th Infantry Division, Minnesota Army National Guard, also supported SFOR 11.

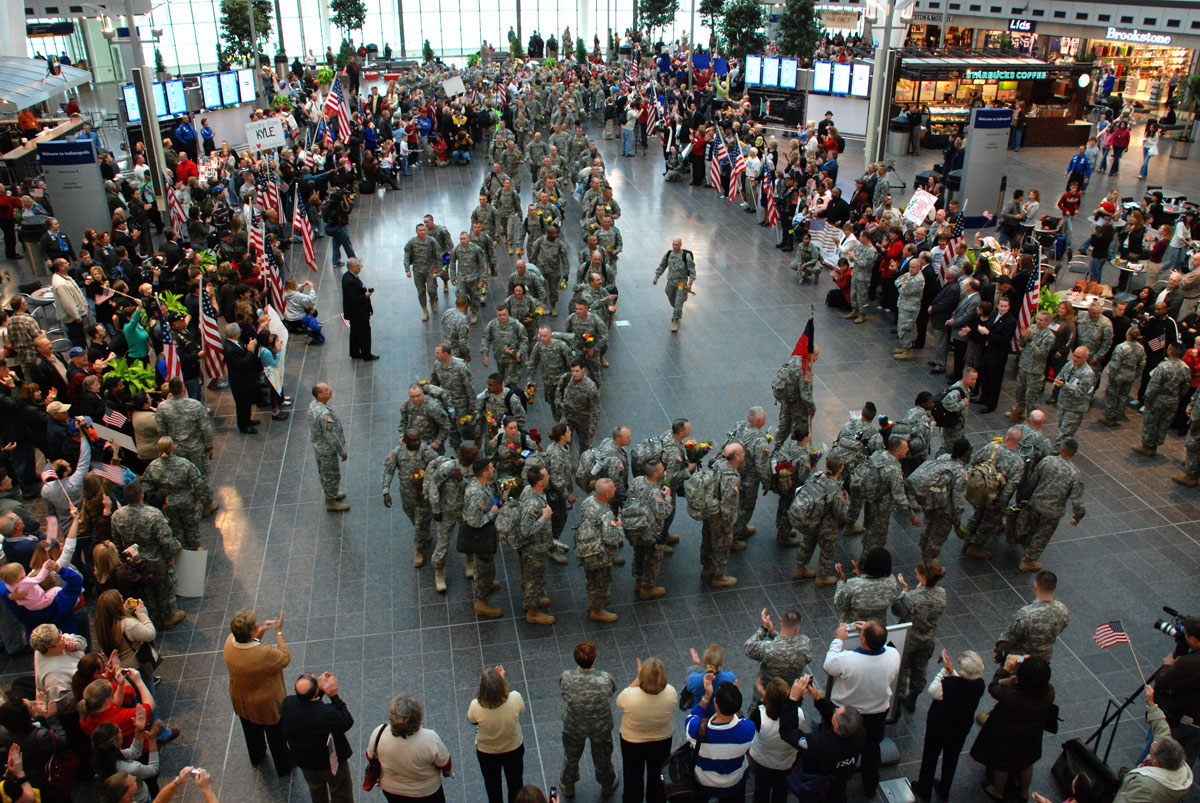
Soldiers of the brigade return from Iraq.

Late 2002 the 76th BDE was called on to provide a Separate Infantry Battalion to provide support for an escalating campaign in the Middle East. The 1st Battalion, 293rd Infantry Regiment was mobilized to camp Arifjan Kuwait on 2 January 2003. The "Nightfighters" set up security for the newly constructed support base. On D+5 the 1st Battalion, 293rd Infantry Regiment was called on to move north to support Operation Iraqi Freedom, with the attachment of Company A, 1st Battalion 152nd Infantry, to the vicinity of Tallil Air Base near the city of An Nasiriyah, Iraq. 1st Battalion, 293rd Infantry subsequently returned to Kuwait in the summer and redeployed to Indiana in October 2003. The 1st Battalion, 152nd Infantry "Predators" were mobilized at Camp Atterbury, Indiana on 2 January 2003 and deployed to Kuwait in mid-February 2003. The 1st Battalion, 152nd Infantry employed companies in Baghdad (initially in support of 5th Special Forces Group), Forward Operating Base Kalsu (approximately 30 miles south of Baghdad in the "Sunni Triangle"), and Convoy Service Center Scania, both of which were along Main Supply Route (MSR) Tampa. In January 2004, 1st Battalion 152nd Infantry was replaced by 2nd Battalion, 505th Parachute Infantry Regiment and redeployed to Indiana in February 2004.

On 6 April 2004 elements of the 76th Infantry Brigade were ordered to mobilize for deployment to Afghanistan. Three hundred soldiers from the 113th Support Battalion, and an unidentified number of soldiers from the 1st Battalion, 151st Infantry Regiment, the 38th Military Police Company, and the 1438th Transportation Company began deploying in July 2004.

The unit suffered at least four casualties, on 26 March 2005, four soldiers, Captain Michael T. Fiscus, Master Sergeant Michael T. Heister, Specialist Brett M. Hershey, and Private First Class Norman K. Snyder were killed when a mine detonated near their vehicle as they were traveling near Kabul.

In October 2004, the 376th Engineer Company was mobilized for duty in Mosul, Iraq, in support of Operation Iraqi Freedom.

In December 2007, the brigade was activated again to support Operation Iraqi Freedom. The brigade trained for 1 month at Camp Atterbury, Indiana and then on 3 January 2008 moved to Fort Stewart, Georgia, to conduct an additional 2 1/2 months' training before deploying to Iraq. Once in Iraq, the Brigade HQ assumed duties of the Garrison Command at Joint Base Balad. The 1st BN 293rd Infantry, also at Balad, was under the operational control of the 55th Sustainment Brigade and conducted convoy security missions throughout Central Iraq. The 1st BN 151st Infantry conducted a similar mission out of Camp Spicher (Tikrit, Iraq). 1–163 FA was assigned Convoy Security duties operating out of Mosul. The 1–152 Cavalry was under the Operational Control of 17th Sustainment Brigade and provide Convoy Security from Q-West. Other elements of the brigade were assigned across the country. The brigade returned to Indiana in December 2008 after a successful mission.

In November 2012, headquarters company returned from a nine-month deployment to Afghanistan, in support of Operation Enduring Freedom.

== Organization 2025 ==
As of February 2026 the 76th Mobile Brigade Combat Team consists of the following units:

- 76th Mobile Brigade Combat Team, in Lawrence
  - Headquarters and Headquarters Company, 76th Mobile Brigade Combat Team, in Lawrence
  - 1st Squadron, 152nd Cavalry Regiment, in New Albany
    - Headquarters and Headquarters Troop, 1st Squadron, 152nd Cavalry Regiment, in New Albany
    - Troop A, 1st Squadron, 152nd Cavalry Regiment, in Madison
    - Troop B, 1st Squadron, 152nd Cavalry Regiment, in Connersville
    - Troop C (Dismounted), 1st Squadron, 152nd Cavalry Regiment, in Salem
  - 1st Battalion, 151st Infantry Regiment, in Columbus
    - Headquarters and Headquarters Company, 1st Battalion, 151st Infantry Regiment, in Columbus
    - Company A, 1st Battalion, 151st Infantry Regiment, in Greenfield
    - Company B, 1st Battalion, 151st Infantry Regiment, in Martinsville
    - Company C, 1st Battalion, 151st Infantry Regiment, at Stout Field
    - Company D (Weapons), 1st Battalion, 151st Infantry Regiment, in Washington
    - Company C, 2nd Battalion, 134th Infantry Regiment, in Seymour (part of 45th Infantry Brigade Combat Team)
  - 2nd Battalion, 151st Infantry Regiment, in South Bend
    - Headquarters and Headquarters Company, 2nd Battalion, 151st Infantry Regiment, in South Bend
    - Company A, 2nd Battalion, 151st Infantry Regiment, at Gary/Chicago Airport
    - Company B, 2nd Battalion, 151st Infantry Regiment, in Logansport
    - Company C, 2nd Battalion, 151st Infantry Regiment, in Warsaw
      - Detachment 1, Company C, 2nd Battalion, 151st Infantry Regiment, in Peru
    - Company D (Weapons), 2nd Battalion, 151st Infantry Regiment, in Frankfort
  - 1st Battalion, 293rd Infantry Regiment, in Fort Wayne
    - Headquarters and Headquarters Company, 1st Battalion, 293rd Infantry Regiment, in Fort Wayne
    - Company A, 1st Battalion, 293rd Infantry Regiment, in Hartford City
    - Company B, 1st Battalion, 293rd Infantry Regiment, in Fort Wayne
    - Company C, 1st Battalion, 293rd Infantry Regiment, in Angola
    - Company D (Weapons), 1st Battalion, 293rd Infantry Regiment, in Bluffton
  - 1st Battalion, 163rd Field Artillery Regiment, in Evansville
    - Headquarters and Headquarters Battery, 1st Battalion, 163rd Field Artillery Regiment, in Evansville
      - Detachment 1, Headquarters and Headquarters Battery, 1st Battalion, 163rd Field Artillery Regiment, in Lawrence (supports 76th Mobile Brigade Combat Team Headquarters)
      - Detachment 2, Headquarters and Headquarters Battery, 1st Battalion, 163rd Field Artillery Regiment, in Columbus (supports 1st Battalion, 151st Infantry Regiment)
      - Detachment 3, Headquarters and Headquarters Battery, 1st Battalion, 163rd Field Artillery Regiment, in Fort Wayne (supports 1st Battalion, 293rd Infantry Regiment)
      - Detachment 4, Headquarters and Headquarters Battery, 1st Battalion, 163rd Field Artillery Regiment, in South Bend (supports 2nd Battalion, 151st Infantry Regiment)
      - Detachment 5, Headquarters and Headquarters Battery, 1st Battalion, 163rd Field Artillery Regiment, in New Albany (supports 1st Squadron, 152nd Cavalry Regiment)
    - Battery A, 1st Battalion, 163rd Field Artillery Regiment, in Evansville
    - Battery B, 1st Battalion, 163rd Field Artillery Regiment, in Vincennes
    - Battery C, 1st Battalion, 163rd Field Artillery Regiment, in Indianapolis
  - 776th Brigade Engineer Battalion, in Lawrence
    - Headquarters and Headquarters Company, 776th Brigade Engineer Battalion, in Lawrence
    - Company A (Combat Engineer), 776th Brigade Engineer Battalion, in Winchester
    - Company B (Combat Engineer), 776th Brigade Engineer Battalion, in LaPorte
    - Company C (Signal), 776th Brigade Engineer Battalion, in Lawrence
    - Company D (Military Intelligence), 776th Brigade Engineer Battalion, at Stout Field
      - Detachment 1, Company D (Military Intelligence), 776th Brigade Engineer Battalion, at Camp Atterbury-Muscatatuck (RQ-28A UAV)
  - 113th Light Support Battalion, in Muncie
    - Headquarters and Headquarters Company, 113th Light Support Battalion, in Muncie
    - Company A (Distribution), 113th Light Support Battalion, in Muncie
    - Company B (Maintenance), 113th Light Support Battalion, in Richmond
    - Company C (Medical), 113th Light Support Battalion, in Anderson
    - Company D (Forward Support), 113th Light Support Battalion, in Scottsburg — attached to 1st Squadron, 152nd Cavalry Regiment
    - Company E (Forward Support), 113th Light Support Battalion, in Lawrence — attached to 776th Brigade Engineer Battalion
    - Company F (Forward Support), 113th Light Support Battalion, in Evansville — attached to 1st Battalion, 163rd Field Artillery Regiment
    - Company G (Forward Support), 113th Light Support Battalion, in Bedford — attached to 1st Battalion, 151st Infantry Regiment
    - Company H (Forward Support), 113th Light Support Battalion, in Fort Wayne — attached to 1st Battalion, 293rd Infantry Regiment
    - Company J (Forward Support), 113th Light Support Battalion, in South Bend — attached to 2nd Battalion, 151st Infantry Regiment

== Sources ==
- Public Affairs Office, 76th Brigade Combat Team
