= Operation Kentucky Jumper =

Military operation of the Vietnam War

- Part of the Vietnam War
Date	1 March – 14 August 1969
Location	Thừa Thiên Province, South Vietnam

Belligerents
United States; South Vietnam	North Vietnam

Commanders and leaders
(United States) Melvin Zais; John M. Wright (South Vietnam) Ngô Quang Trưởng	

Strength
(United States) 101st Airborne Division (South Vietnam) 3rd Regiment, 1st Infantry Division	

Casualties and losses
(United States) 61 killed	(North Vietnam) 317 killed

Operation Kentucky Jumper was a joint U.S. Army and Army of the Republic of Vietnam (ARVN) military operation during the Vietnam War designed to seek out and destroy People's Army of Vietnam (PAVN) and Vietcong (VC) units, interdict their base areas and infiltration routes and to support the Accelerated Pacification Program southwest of Huế, Thừa Thiên Province.

== Operation ==
The operation commenced on 1 March 1969 centered in an area 12 miles (19 km) south-southwest of Huế. On 12 March at approximately 17:00, troops from the 2nd Brigade, 101st Airborne Division air assaulted into an area 12 miles southwest of Huế and immediately made contact receiving small arms, automatic weapons and Rocket-propelled grenade (RPG) fire from an estimated PAVN company. The infantry returned fire killing 12 PAVN and capturing one individual and two crew-served weapons in a bunker complex. U.S. losses were two killed and two wounded KIA.

On 5 May at approximately 16:30, a unit of the 3rd Brigade, 101st Airborne while sweeping an area approximately 25 miles (40 km) west-southwest of Huế found several graves which contained the bodies of 12 PAVN/VC soldiers killed by small arms fire and airstrikes within the preceding 24 hours.

At 01:50 on 19 June the PAVN 4th Regiment attacked Firebase Tomahawk 4 miles (6.4 km) west-northwest of Phú Lộc District which was occupied by the 2nd Battalion, 501st Infantry Regiment and 2nd Battalion, 138th Artillery. The troops defended with unit weapons, point-blank artillery fire and by helicopter gunships and an AC-47 Spooky gunship of the 14th Special Operations Wing. Approximately ten PAVN penetrated the outer perimeter, but in the close fighting were either killed or driven out. The PAVN withdrew at 06:00 and ten PAVN dead were counted and one suspect detained. U.S. losses were 13 killed (including nine Kentucky Army National Guardsmen from the 138th Artillery).

== Aftermath ==
The operation resulted in 317 PAVN/VC killed and 55 crew-served and 254 individual weapons captured. U.S. casualties were 61 killed and 409 wounded.
