= Breonna Taylor protests =

2020–22 protests after the police shooting of Breonna Taylor

- Part of the United States racial unrest (2020–2023) and the Black Lives Matter movement
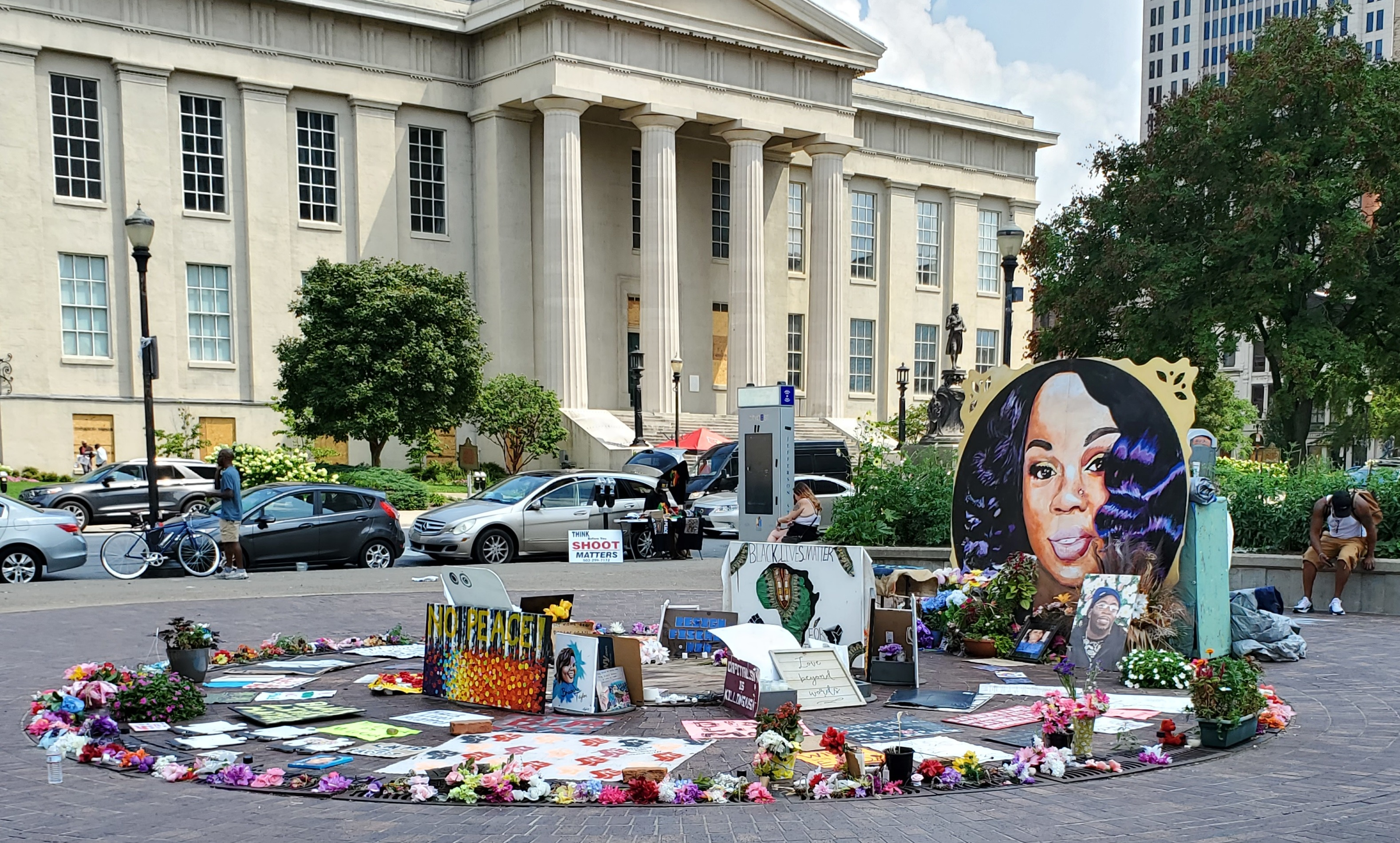
- Memorial for Breonna Taylor in Louisville, Kentucky
- Date: May 26, 2020 – August 4, 2022 (2 years, 2 months, 1 week and 2 days)
- Location: United States
- Caused by: Shooting of Breonna Taylor; Murder of George Floyd; Police brutality; Lack of police accountability; Inequality and racism
- Methods: Protests, demonstrations, civil disobedience, online activism

The Breonna Taylor protests were a series of police brutality protests surrounding the killing of Breonna Taylor. Taylor was a 26-year-old African-American woman who was fatally shot by plainclothes officers of the Louisville Metro Police Department on March 13, 2020. Police were initially given "no-knock" search warrant, but orders were changed to "knock and announce" before the raid. Taylor's boyfriend, Kenneth Walker, who was inside the apartment with her during the raid, said he thought the officers were intruders. He fired one shot, hitting officer Mattingly in the leg, and the officers fired 32 shots in return, killing Taylor.

For months after the shooting, there were demands from Taylor's family, the family's attorneys, members of the local community, and protesters worldwide that the officers involved in the shooting be fired and criminally charged. On September 23, 2020, a state grand jury indicted Brett Hankison, one of the three officers who shot during the incident, on three counts of first-degree wanton endangerment for endangering Taylor's neighbors with his shots. He was later acquitted. On August 4, 2022, Hankison and three other officers were federally charged with violating Taylor's civil rights, unlawful conspiracy, obstruction and unconstitutional use of force.

== Timeline ==
=== May 2020 ===
Protesters in Indianapolis shouting out Taylor's name in remembrance for what would have been her 27th birthday.

On May 26, multiple protesters, including friends and family of Taylor, protested outside Louisville Mayor Greg Fischer's office and demanded the three officers be arrested and charged with murder.

On May 27, one Louisville police sergeant said that "The comment section is full of 'All cops need to die' and 'Kill pigs' and things like that" and that several days earlier, while responding to a 911 call near Taylor's apartment, multiple people threw pieces of concrete at police officers (who were uninjured) and then ran away.

On May 28, 500 to 600 demonstrators marched in Downtown Louisville, chanting, "No justice, no peace, prosecute police!" and "Breonna, Breonna, Breonna!" The protests continued into the early morning of May 29, when seven people were shot; one was in critical condition. At the same time, Taylor's sister, Juniyah Palmer, posted on her Facebook page, "At this point y'all are no longer doing this for my sister! You guys are just vandalizing stuff for NO reason, I had a friend ask people why they are there most didn't even know the 'protest' was for my sister." These protests and demonstrations were part of the nationwide reaction to the murder of George Floyd, an African-American man who was killed in police custody on May 25, 2020.

=== June 2020 ===
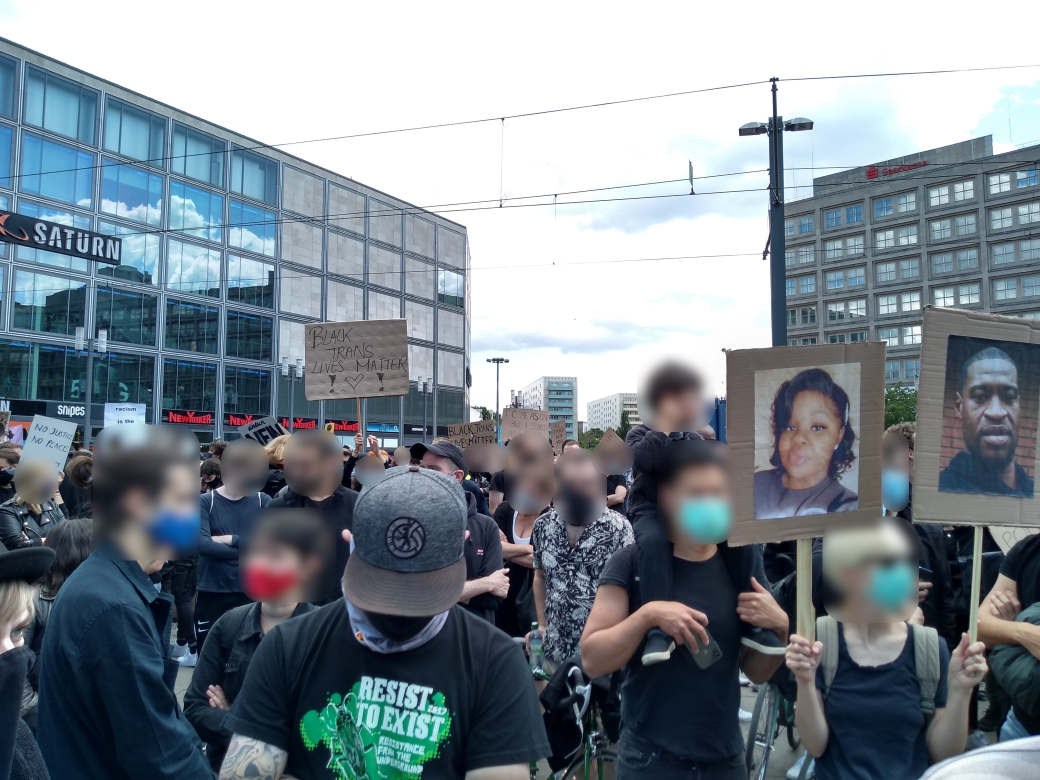
A protest against racism in Berlin, Germany, on June 6, 2020; demonstrators hold posters with the photos of Breonna Taylor and George Floyd.

On June 1, 2020, David McAtee, a 53-year-old African-American man, was fatally shot by the Kentucky Army National Guard in Louisville during nationwide protests following the murder of George Floyd and the killing of Breonna Taylor. The Louisville Metro Police Department (LMPD) and National Guard were in the area to enforce a curfew. According to officials, the police and soldiers were fired upon by McAtee, and two Louisville officers and two National Guardsmen returned fire. McAtee was killed by a shot fired from a guardsman. The body cams of the police involved were deactivated during the shooting, in violation of department policy. Hours later, police chief Steve Conrad was fired by Louisville Mayor Greg Fischer.

On June 27, Steven Lopez was arrested after firing shots on the crowd of protesters gathered at Louisville's Jefferson Square Park, killing one and injuring another. Lopez had previously taken part in the Breonna Taylor protests before the incident took place as well, but later got into arguments with other Jefferson Park protesters which resulted in at least three reported physical confrontations. Lopez was also among a group of 17 Louisville protesters who had been arrested on June 17 for inciting a riot, disorderly conduct, harassment and possession of drug paraphernalia.

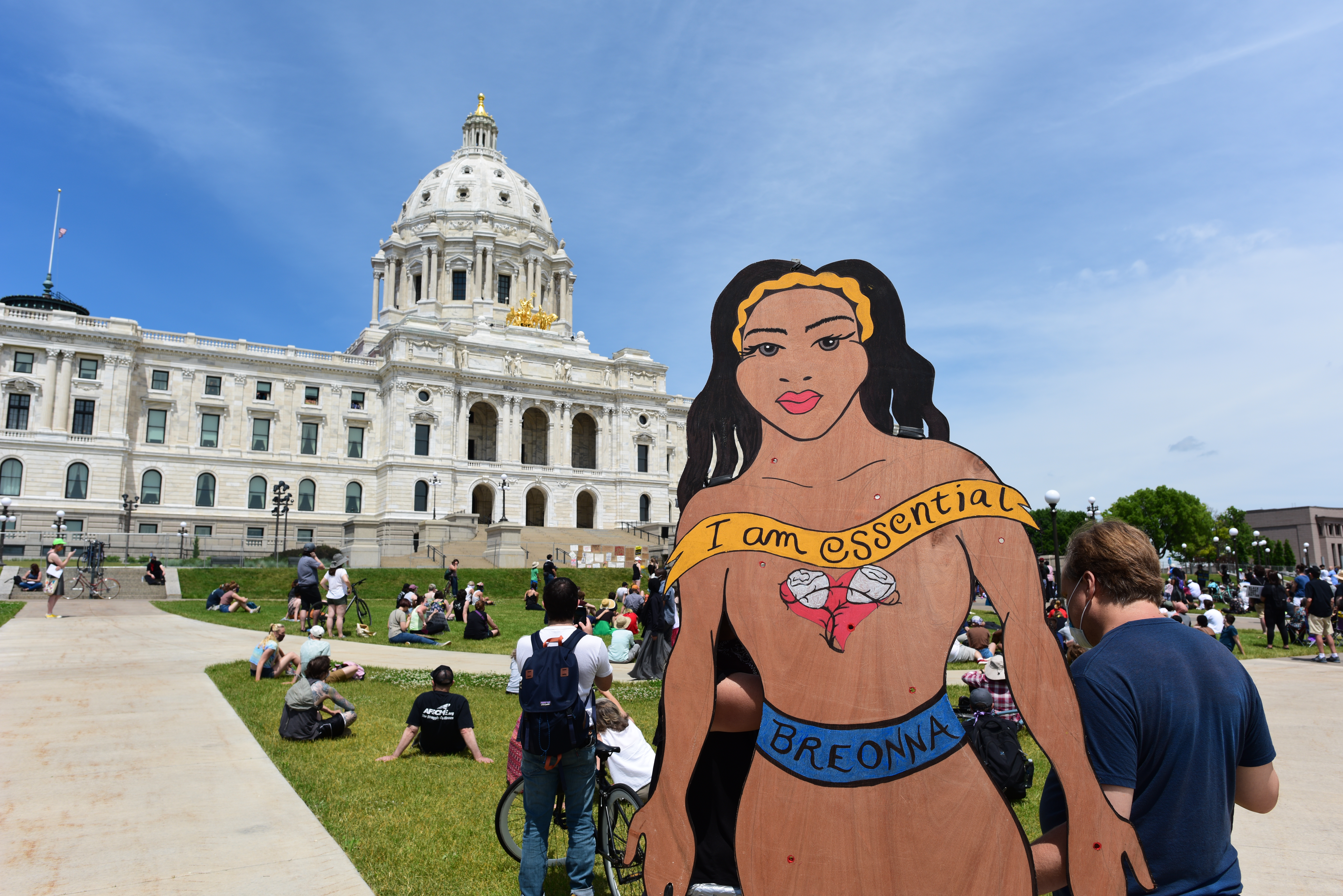
A Breonna Taylor cardboard cutout at a rally at the state capitol building in Saint Paul, Minnesota, June 2020

In Saint Paul, Minnesota, protesters seeking justice for Breonna Taylor held a "Red Sunday" march on June 26 and gathered at several locations in the Twin Cities.

=== July 2020 ===
On July 4, over 100 people participated in the Youth March for Freedom in downtown Louisville. The participants stopped at historical civil rights sites, and speakers called for the end of racial injustice and told the stories of the people affiliated with the sites. On July 14, the national social justice organization Until Freedom organized a march of over 100 people to Attorney General Cameron's house, where protesters occupied his lawn, demanding charges against the officers involved in the killing. Police officers and a police helicopter were present as 87 protesters, including Houston Texans wide receiver Kenny Stills and The Real Housewives of Atlanta star Porsha Williams, were arrested and removed from the lawn.

By mid-July, there had been about 50 days of protests. According to LMPD, 435 protesters had been arrested. On July 24, protesters marched into the NuLu area of Louisville, blocked the 600 block of E. Market Street with metal barricades and set up long metal tables for an impromptu block party to highlight demands for NuLu business owners, including hiring a more proportionate number of black workers. Police cleared the street and arrested 76 protesters who refused to leave.

On July 25, 300 members of the Atlanta-based black militia NFAC (Not Fucking Around Coalition) marched to Louisville's Metro Hall with the street lined with local protesters. NFAC founder John "Grandmaster Jay" Johnson gave a speech calling on officials to speed up and be more transparent about the investigation into Taylor's death.

=== August 2020 ===
As of August 10, LMPD had arrested 500 protesters over 75 days of protests.

=== September 2020 ===
On September 23, the night after the grand jury verdict was announced, protesters gathered in the Jefferson Square Park area of Louisville as well as many other U.S. cities, including Los Angeles, Dallas, Minneapolis, New York, Chicago, Atlanta, Cincinnati, Denver, Nashville, Philadelphia, Seattle, San Diego, Las Vegas, and Portland. The previous day, a state of emergency had been declared in Louisville in anticipation of the verdict announcement. Over 1000 Kentucky National Guardsmen were mobilized to supplement the LMPD to assist with demonstration control and curfew enforcement In Louisville, two LMPD officers were shot during the protest and one suspect was kept in custody. Two reporters from the right-wing website The Daily Caller were arrested and charged with breaking curfew and unlawful assembly. In Buffalo, a pickup truck was driven through a crowd of protesters, striking and injuring one.

In Seattle, 13 were arrested for charges ranging from failure to disperse, obstruction, property damage, resisting arrest, and assaulting an officer. One officer was struck on the head with a baseball bat cracking his helmet. In the early morning of September 24, a Seattle Police Officer is seen in a video riding his bicycle over the head of a protester lying on the ground. As a result of a Seattle Police Department use of force investigation, an unnamed police officer was placed on administrative leave after rolling both wheels of his bicycle over the head of a protester lying in the street. The incident was referred to the King County Sheriff's Office for a potential criminal investigation.

In December, the Seattle Police Department was held in federal contempt by the U.S. District Judge Richard Jones for the "indiscriminate" use of blast balls and pepper spray during 2020 BLM protests. "On Sept. 23, an officer who was several rows back from the front of the police line threw a blast ball into a crowd, then immediately turned around, demonstrating a 'clear lack of care for where the blast ball landed'."

On September 24, Kentucky state representative and former member of the Louisville Metro Council Attica Scott, the only black woman in the Kentucky General Assembly, was arrested in Louisville before the start of the curfew and spent the night in jail. Along with 17 others Scott was charged with felony first-degree rioting, misdemeanor failure to disperse and misdemeanor unlawful assembly. The charge of rioting was dismissed on October 6 and the misdemeanor charges were dropped on November 16.

In Denver, one person was detained for driving into a protester. No injuries were reported.

On September 27, a peaceful demonstration in solidarity with Breonna Taylor occurred at Riverside Park in Wichita, Kansas.

=== December 2020 ===
On December 3, 2020, the founder of the NFAC, a Black separatism movement, John "Grandmaster Jay" Johnson, was indicted on charges of allegedly pointing his rifle at Police Officers. He is being investigated by the F.B.I.

=== March 2021 ===
On and around the anniversary of the killing, hundreds of people gathered for protests and civil unrest in cities across the United States including Louisville, Atlanta, Boston, Denver, Grand Rapids, Portland, New York, Washington, D.C., and Seattle. Los Angeles Police Chief Michel Moore said that three officers received minor injuries, nine businesses were vandalized and 11 protesters were arrested.

Kentucky Republicans work to pass the controversial 'Kentucky Senate Bill 211', which would make it a misdemeanor to insult Kentucky Police Officers, thus being punishable by up to 90 days in jail. It has been criticized as an infringement on free speech, and as a form of suppression of protesters for Police Accountability. The bill is currently on hold until 2022 and until further notice.

== See also ==
- 2020–2023 United States racial unrest
- George Floyd protests
- Daunte Wright protests
- Police Brutality in the United States
