= 623rd Field Artillery Regiment =

Unit of the Kentucky Army National Guard (US)

623rd Field Artillery Regiment (Morgan's Men)
- Coat of arms
- Active: Lineage traced to units formed on 22 May 1846
- Country: United States
- Branch: Kentucky Army National Guard
- Type: Field Artillery
- Nickname: First Kentucky
- Motto: "Seize The Opportunity"

The 623rd Field Artillery Regiment (Morgan's Men) is a single-battalion unit of the Kentucky Army National Guard. The unit draws its lineage from cavalry and infantry units of the Kentucky Militia formed in 1846 for service in the Mexican–American War. Its antecedents include units that served on both sides of the American Civil War as well as those that fought for the United States in the Spanish–American War, World War One and World War Two. The unit was first designated as the 623rd Field Artillery Battalion in 1947, serving under that name in the Korean War. It was part of the 138th Artillery Regiment in the 1960s before becoming the 623rd Artillery Regiment in 1969 and the 623rd Field Artillery Regiment in 1972. The unit served in the Gulf War as a self-propelled artillery unit; it is now equipped with the M142 HIMARS system.

The unit's special designation "Morgan's Men" refers to Confederate general John Hunt Morgan. The 623rd is one of a small number of US military units whose special designations refer to their Confederate lineage. The Kentucky National Guard is in the process of reviewing the designation for the 623rd.

== Lineage ==
The unit draws official lineage from the 1st Kentucky Cavalry and 2nd Kentucky Volunteer Infantry, formed in the Kentucky Militia on 22 May 1846 during the Mexican–American War. The unit was mustered into Federal Service for a year before returning to the state as separate militia companies. The companies were reorganized on 15 June 1860 as the Lexington Battalion of the Kentucky State Guard, absorbing the Lexington Rifles, founded in 1857 by John Hunt Morgan. With the coming of the American Civil War in 1861 the unit broke up as men joined the Confederate or Union forces. The Lexington Rifles were reorganized as an independent cavalry company and amalgamated with two other companies in October 1861 to form Morgan's Squadron, Kentucky Cavalry. This unit expanded in June 1862 to form the 2nd Kentucky Cavalry Regiment (Morgan's Men).

After the war the Kentucky State Guard was reorganized; on 18 May 1881 the Lexington Battalion became the 3rd Battalion and in 1882 the 2nd Regiment of Infantry. This unit was mustered into Federal Service as the 2nd Kentucky Volunteer Infantry during the Spanish–American War. It briefly became the 1st Regiment of Infantry in the Kentucky State Guard in 1899 before reverting to its previous designation of the 2nd. The State Guard became the Kentucky Army National Guard on 19 March 1912. The 2nd Regiment of Infantry was mustered into Federal Service during World War One and combined with the 3d Regiment of Infantry to become the 149th Infantry Regiment in the 38th Infantry Division. The unit was demobilized in January 1919 and reorganized in 1920–21 to form the 1st Infantry Regiment and the 53d and 54th Machine Gun Squadrons. The machine gun squadrons were consolidated and redesignated as the 123rd Cavalry Regiment on 1 April 1929. On 1 November 1940 the 123rd Cavalry Regiment was reorganized as the 103rd and 106th Separate Battalions of Coast Artillery. The 106th mustered into Federal Service in 1941 and was redesignated as the 106th Antiaircraft Artillery Automatic Weapons Battalion on 14 July 1944. It was inactivated on 3 December 1945.

== History as 623rd ==
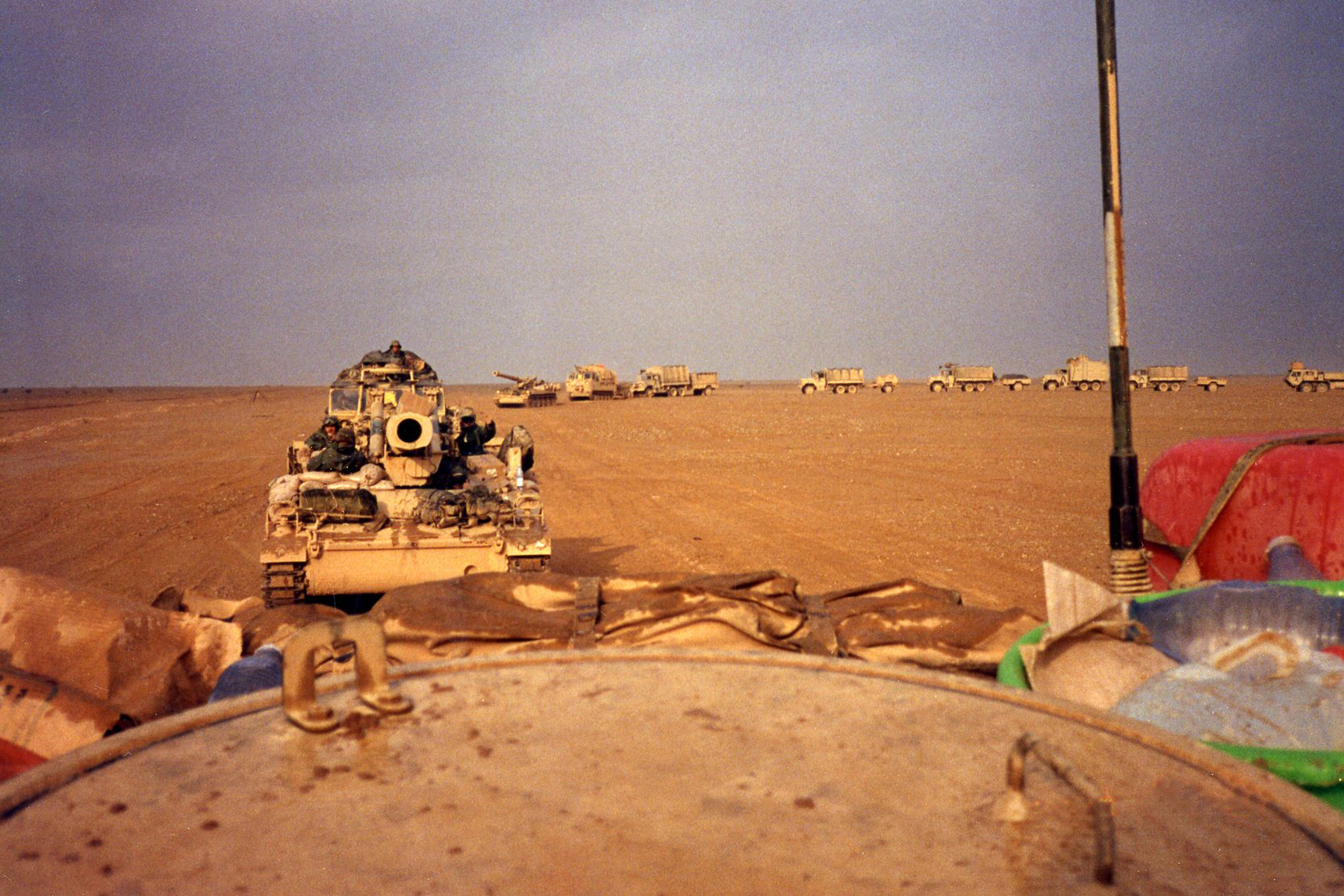
1st Battalion, 623rd Field Artillery in Kuwait, January 1991

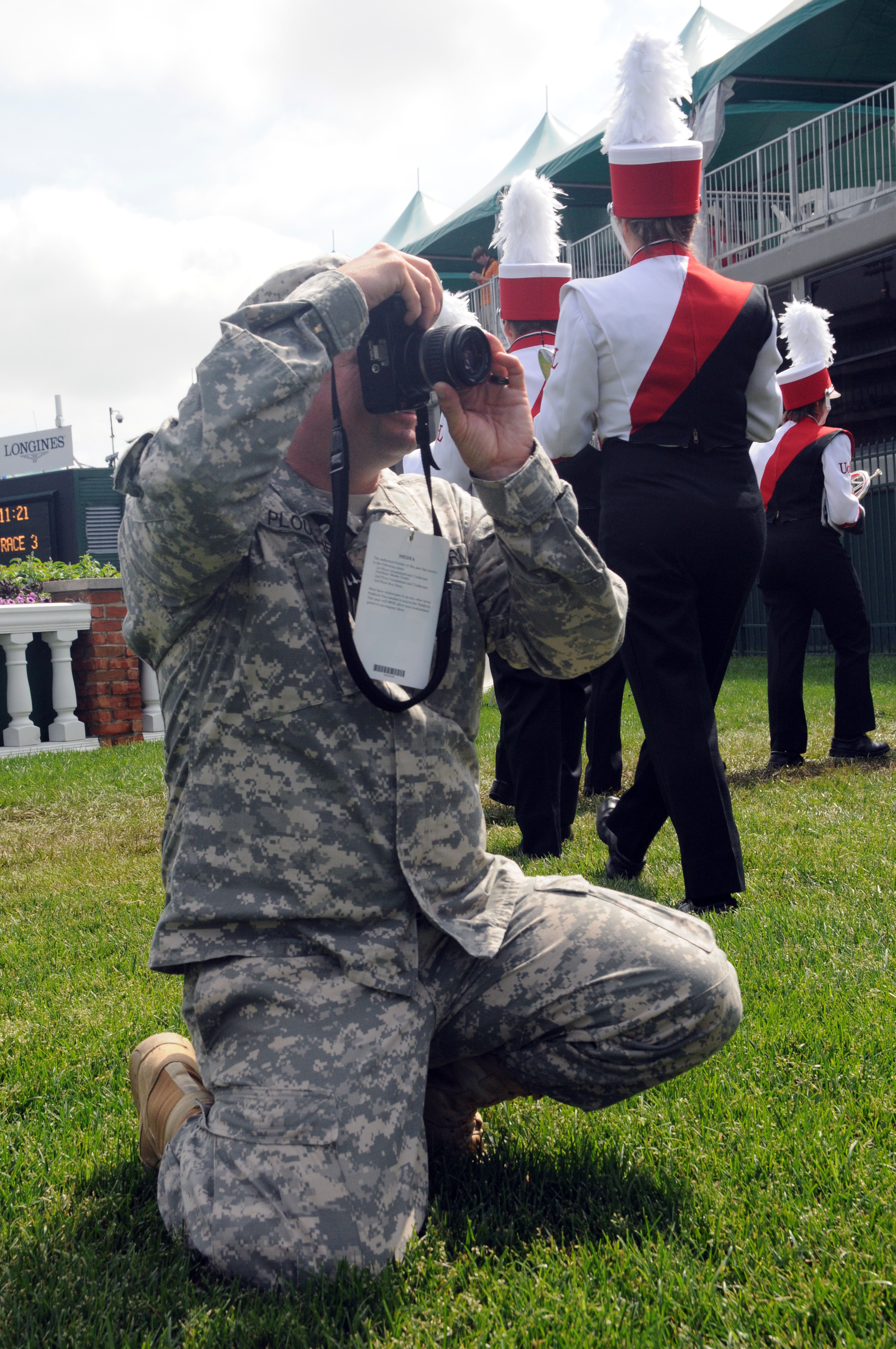
A 623rd Field Artillery Regiment photographer in 2012

The 106th Antiaircraft Artillery Automatic Weapons Battalion became the 623rd Field Artillery Battalion on 29 January 1947. The unit entered Federal Service in 1951 during the Korean War, becoming the 623rd Armored Field Artillery Battalion and then the 623rd Field Artillery Battalion. It returned to state service on 18 March 1955. The unit was reorganized as the 4th Howitzer Battalion of the 138th Artillery Regiment on 1 October 1959. It lost the howitzer designation on 1 February 1968 and on 1 May 1969 was reorganized as the 623rd Artillery Regiment, a single-battalion unit under the U.S. Army Combat Arms Regimental System. It became the 623rd Field Artillery Regiment on 1 March 1972. The unit was mustered into Federal Service on 9 December 1990, deploying to Saudi Arabia for the Gulf War. It was equipped with the M110A2 howitzer and, as part of the XVIII Airborne Corps, advanced as far as Basra before the war ended. The unit returned to state control on 21 May 1991. The unit was reorganized as 1st Battalion, 623rd Field Artillery (MLRS), on 15 December 1994, after receiving the M270 Multiple Launch Rocket System.

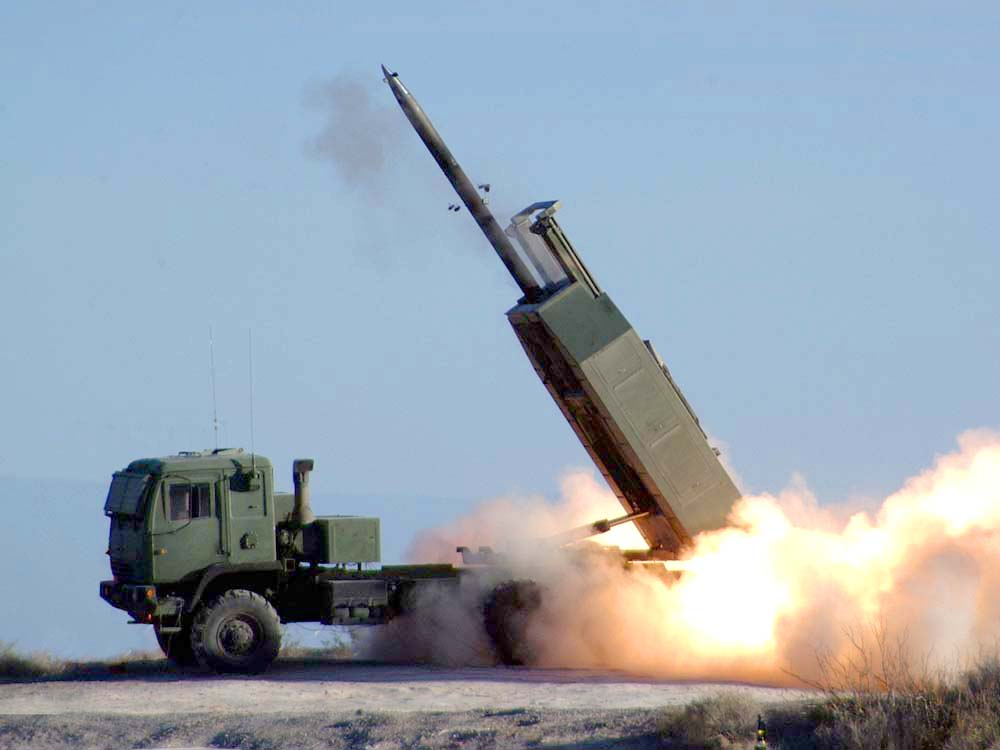
The HIMARS system in operation

The unit is currently part of the Kentucky Army National Guard's 138th Field Artillery Brigade. In January 2012 it deployed to Jordan and Africa. The 623rd became the first Kentucky Army National Guard unit to deploy to Jordan. The 623rd took part in the June 2018 Operation Saber Strike United States Army Europe and Africa training exercise in Lithuania, supporting the regular 2nd Cavalry Regiment. By this point it was equipped with the M142 HIMARS system.

== Special designation ==
The special designation (official nickname) of the 623rd Field Artillery Regiment is "Morgan's Men", in reference to its Confederate lineage. The unit applied for and received the designation in 1969. The choice of the name appears to have been associated with the Lost Cause movement, of which Morgan is a hero. The 623rd is one of at least three American military units to retain special designations associated with a Confederate lineage, at least three others have names otherwise associated with the Confederacy. All of these units are within the state-controlled National Guard. In reference to the special designation the commander of the 623rd uses "Morgan 6" as his radio call sign.

Following the 2020 murder of George Floyd some Army commands have phased out Confederate references; a December 2020 law mandated the removal of Confederate-related names from United States Department of Defense property. Any change to unit special designations must be initiated by the unit itself. The Kentucky National Guard is reviewing its special designations, including that of the 623rd, and will determine if it should be changed.

== Insignia and motto ==
The 623rd Field Artillery Regiment's distinctive unit insignia was approved on 1 May 1952 and references the combat record of units in its lineage. A cactus references the Mexican-American War and a saltire references the American Civil War. The saltire is gray, indicating Confederate service and the field is yellow, indicating the cavalry role. Two blue pallets (vertical stripes) represent the Spanish-American War and World War One and a fleurs-de-lys represents World War Two.

The 623rd's shoulder sleeve insignia was approved on 26 June 1979. It is a shield split palewise (vertically) with a red left field and a yellow right field; the shield is defaced with a blue horse's head in profile and the whole set within a red border. The red and yellow are the traditional colors of the field artillery while the blue of the horse's head alludes to Kentucky being the Bluegrass State. The horse recognises the association of Lexington with horse racing and also, through allusion to the movement of the knight chess piece, the ability of the unit, as artillery, to strike behind enemy lines.

The motto of the 623rd was "Seize The Opportunity", from the 123rd Cavalry Regiment to represents the feats of Morgan's raiders in the Civil War. On 13 October 2023 it was changed to "Second to No One" at the direction of the Naming Commission.

== Campaign participation credits ==
The unit has been awarded campaign participation credits for the following actions:

Mexican War

- Battle of Buena Vista

Civil War (Union service)

- Battle of Shiloh
- Battle of Murfreesboro
- Battle of Chickamauga
- Western Virginia campaign 1861
- Mississippi campaign 1862
- Kentucky campaign 1862
- Kentucky campaign 1864
- Tennessee campaign 1863

Civil War (Confederate service)

- Battles of Fort Henry and Fort Donelson
- Battle of Shiloh
- Battle of Murfreesboro
- Battle of Chickamauga
- Battle of Atlanta
- Kentucky campaign 1862
- Kentucky campaign 1864
- Louisiana 1862
- Mississippi campaign 1862
- Tennessee campaign 1862
- Tennessee campaign 1863
- Indiana campaign (Morgan's Raid)1863
- South Carolina 1865

World War I

- Awarded campaign streamer with no inscription

World War II

- Algeria-French Morocco campaign (with arrowhead)
- Tunisia campaign
- Sicily campaign (with arrowhead)
- Naples-Foggia campaign (with arrowhead)
- Battle of Anzio (with arrowhead)
- Rome-Arno
- Southern France (with arrowhead)
- Rhineland
- Ardennes-Alsace
- Central Europe

Korean War

- Second Korean Winter
- Korea, Summer-Fall 1952
- Third Korean Winter
- Korea, Summer 1953

Southwest Asia

- Liberation and Defense of Kuwait
- Cease-Fire

The unit's Battery B (Campbellsville) is additionally entitled to the credits:

World War II

- New Guinea campaign
- Battle of Leyte
- Battle of Luzon

== Unit decorations ==
For service in the Korean War the unit was awarded a Navy Unit Commendation with a streamer embroidered "Panmunjom" and a Republic of Korea Presidential Unit Citation with streamer embroidered "Korea 1951–1952". Battery B (Campbellsville) was additionally awarded a Philippine Republic Presidential Unit Citation with streamer embroidered "17 October 1944 to 4 July 1945" for service in the Pacific Theater of World War Two.
