= George Floyd protests in Kentucky =

2020 civil unrest after the murder of Breonna Taylor

Breonna Taylor protests in Kentucky
- Part of George Floyd protests
- Date: May 28 – July 2020 (1 month and 3 days)
- Location: Kentucky, United States
- Caused by: Police brutality; Institutional racism against African Americans; Reaction to the murder of George Floyd; Economic, racial and social inequality

Casualties
- Deaths: 2

This is a list of protests brought on by the murders of Breonna Taylor and George Floyd in Kentucky, United States. In 2020, there were protests throughout Kentucky in reaction to the shooting of Breonna Taylor and murder of George Floyd by police, as well as the shooting of David McAtee by the Kentucky Army National Guard. The demonstrations happened regularly in the largest cities in Kentucky, including Louisville and Lexington. Many of the smaller cities had protests on at least one day.

== Locations ==
=== Barbourville ===
On June 5, protesters gathered at the old "El Mariachi" building on Daniel Boone Drive before marching to the Court Square. This is the first Black Lives Matter protest in Barbourville and was organized by the Tri-County Fairness Coalition. The crowd took a knee and engaged in an eight minute and 46 second moment of silence; the amount of time Derek Chauvin spent kneeling on George Floyd's neck while he was murdering Floyd. Floyd's murder and the death of Louisville's Breonna Taylor spurred protests across the country over racism and police brutality. The Barbourville protest was held on what would have been Taylor's 27 birthday.

=== Benton ===
On June 5, a few hundred demonstrators marched around the courthouse square in Benton. At times demonstrators lay down in the streets by the courthouse in remembrance of George Floyd, and sang "Happy Birthday" to Breonna Taylor, who would have turned 27 on Friday.

=== Bowling Green ===
People protested outside the Bowling Green Police Department the evening of May 29. During the protest, a 24-year-old man hit a protester with his pickup truck and was arrested; police stated that he "had plenty of room... to avoid hitting protesters," and that when they asked if his vehicle had hit the protester, the man replied, "Probably so, there were protesters blocking the fucking road, they deserved to be hit, anyone would." He was arrested, charged with wanton endangerment in the first degree (a felony in Kentucky), and taken to Warren County Regional Jail.

=== Corbin ===
About 140 people attended a peaceful protest on June 4, with some hecklers calling the group "race traitors" and displaying the Confederate flag.

=== Covington ===
On May 31, dozens attended an "uneventful" protest outside Central Police Headquarters. City officials enacted a curfew.

=== Elizabethtown ===
Peaceful protests were held two nights in a row on May 30 and 31 in downtown Elizabethtown. A gathering of protesters circled around The Hardin County Attorney's Office exterior, holding signs and chanting phrases such as “No Justice, No Peace,” “Black Lives Matter” and “Hands Up, Don't Shoot.”

=== Elsmere ===
On June 6, hundreds of protesters walked for two miles along Dixie Highway to the Elsmere Police Department to support George Floyd and Breonna Taylor.

=== Fort Mitchell ===
More than 200 people marched through the streets of this Northern Kentucky suburb against racial injustice on the afternoon of June 6. Protesters met at 12pm outside the Fort Mitchell city building, where organizer and former Beechwood football team captain John Willis and other recent graduates gave speeches. The group then kneeled for 90 seconds in honor of Floyd.

=== Frankfort ===
On June 5, around 2,500 people marched from the Old State Capitol to the Kentucky State Capitol before heading to downtown Frankfort.

=== Franklin ===
On May 31, Downtown Franklin was full of those who were wishing for their voices to be heard. Several speakers took to the stage from the Simpson County Judge-Executive to the police chief and sheriff as well as several community leaders to speak out against the deaths of Floyd and Taylor.

=== Greenville ===
On June 3, Over 100 protesters gathered at Muhlenberg County Courthouse in Greenville to stand in solidarity with and give a voice to Breonna Taylor, George Floyd, Ahmad Arbery and others. Speakers included local pastor, John Lee. While no violence came out of this protest, a heavy police presence was on scene.

=== Henderson ===
On June 6, hundreds of protesters gathered at Henderson's Central Park for a “Rally Against Injustice.” There was a strong police presence on the scene.

=== Hopkinsville ===
On June 6, over 200 people gathered for a peaceful rally in Virginia Park, where a group of speakers addressed inequalities and called for change.

=== Leitchfield ===
Dozens of Black Lives Matter protesters took to Leitchfield Public Square on the nights of June 6 and 7. Protesters carried signs, marched around the courthouse square, and heard from multiple speakers.

Chants of “Say her name: Breonna Taylor;” “No justice, no peace;” “Black lives matter;” “I can't breathe;” and “We want equality,” could be heard across the square throughout the more than three-hour protest.

In addition to the BLM protesters, a contingent of anti-protesters set up across the street, chanting “All lives matter” and igniting heated debates between the two groups at various points throughout the evening.

=== Lexington ===
On May 31, several hundred protesters gathered downtown for the third night in a row. At one point late Sunday, dozens of officers "took a knee" with protesters who were chanting "Kneel with us! Kneel with us!" On June 5, the sixth day of protests in downtown Lexington, members of the Kentucky football team, wearing Black Lives Matter T-shirts and led by their head coach, Mark Stoops marched to demand racial justice and equality. On June 7, a fight occurred at the intersection of East Maxwell and South Limestone when a white male passenger got out of an Uber vehicle and confronted protesters. On June 12, Students, faculty, and staff from the University of Kentucky Colleges of Medicine, Dentistry, Pharmacy, Nursing, Health Sciences, Public Health and Social Work all got on one knee in remembrance of George Floyd, Breonna Taylor, and Ahmad Arbery and to show support to end systemic racism.

On July 11, at a protest rally calling for police accountability and an end to systemic racism, five anti-racism protesters were arrested by the Lexington Police Department (LPD). The event was co-organized by the United Campus Workers of Kentucky, Movement for Black Lives UK, and Cooperation Lexington. The rally was thus composed of UK campus workers, including UK faculty and staff, UK students, and Lexington community organizers and activists. The event proceeded according to plan until officers of the LPD confronted participants upon their entering the street to march in protest and threatened them with arrest. This was the first time the LPD had criminalized this form of non-violent protest. After being threatened with arrest, rally participants proceeded to march and protest on the sidewalk and in designated crosswalks as the LPD instructed them to do. Yet LPD officers waited and watched until a Black woman participant crossed the street at a crosswalk when the signal said not to cross, though there was no oncoming traffic. The officers arrested the participant in the crosswalk, along with three of the main organizers of the event. They forcefully arrested a fifth participant after he came in between an officer and one of the Black woman organizers being arrested. The arrest allegedly involved the use of a chokehold on the participant, something the LPD denies despite cell phone camera footage of the arrest showing an officer bringing the participant to the ground with the officer's arm wrapped around the participant's neck. On July 21, the Lexington branch of the NAACP released a press release condemning the actions of the LPD officers, accusing them of "unprofessionally and illegally retaliating" against the leaders of the protest.

=== Louisville ===
On May 28, protesters demanded justice for the fatal shooting of Breonna Taylor. An estimated 500-600 demonstrators marched through the city that evening. Later during the protest, seven people were shot by an unknown shooter or shooters, with one victim critically injured.

During the night of May 29, more protests took place, attended by hundreds of people. A woman suffered a heart attack as a result of tear gas inhalation, and two journalists were injured by rubber bullets fired by police officers.

On May 30, the governor called in the National Guard. African-American David McAtee was shot and killed by law enforcement just after midnight June 1. Officials said that the Louisville Metro Police Department and Kentucky National Guard were returning fire after being fired at from the crowd. Mayor Greg Fischer stated that Louisville police officers were wearing body cameras, but none of them were on. Fischer called this an "institutional failure," (Note: It is unclear if these were Mayor Fischer's exact words, but this was the wording used in the source article.) stating that "[t]his is the entire reason we have those cameras," and fired Steve Conrad, chief of police, effective immediately.

On the 12th day of protests, current and former Public Defenders marched through downtown chanting "no justice, no peace" to protest racial injustice in criminal justice system.

On June 27, a shooting occurred at a protest at Jefferson Square Park in downtown Louisville. A 27-year-old photographer who supported the protests against racism and police brutality was killed. Another person was injured. Overnight camping at the park was banned after the shooting, and police removed tents from the park. One suspect was arrested, interviewed by homicide detectives, and charged with murder and wanton endangerment. The suspect was hospitalized as he was wounded by gunfire from civilians defending themselves.

During a protest, the hand of a statue of King Louis XVI, who Louisville was named after, was broke off by a protester.

=== Madisonville ===
On June 18, dozens of citizens participated in the "Enough is Enough" protest in Madisonville. The march was three blocks beginning at First Baptist Church on Main Street and ended at the Hopkins County Judicial Center. The protest march was organized by the African American Coalition of Hopkins County, a group that advocates against incidents of injustice against African Americans. Though organizers of the event acknowledged a good relationship with local police, the need to keep the light shinning on the national issue fueled Thursday's peaceful march.

=== Morehead ===
On June 6, a crowd of about 250 people marched down Main Street and gathered at Fountain Park in Morehead in a peaceful protest. The speakers told their stories and allies spoke of the need for allies to support blacks in the community.

=== Murray ===
On Monday afternoon and night, June 1 a peaceful protest and candlelight vigil took place along the North 12th Street sidewalk in front of Murray State's Roy Stewart Stadium resulted in no violence as hundreds of people peacefully protested the killing of Breonna Taylor, the murder of George Floyd, and victims of police violence. This came after a smaller group had marched, also without incident, in the city earlier that afternoon.

=== Owensboro ===
On June 5, a crowd of hundreds of protesters gathered for a "Peace and Reconciliation Rally" at Smothers Park. Over 20 speakers spoke out against the murder of George Floyd. However, a group of protesters blocked off the Blue Bridge for almost an hour.

=== Paducah ===
On May 31, peaceful protesters gathered at Noble Park in a 'Stand for Solidarity', and a die in for over 8 minutes at the local court house over the killing of Breonna Taylor and murder of George Floyd.

=== Pikeville ===
On June 1, peaceful protesters gathered at the Pikeville City Park for a peaceful rally. The event was organized by the Black Student Union at University of Pikeville along with other community leaders.

=== Princeton ===
On June 6, a group of 70 protesters marched on Main Street in Princeton. Protesters carried signs with the names of blacks killed by violence in high-profile incidents — Trayvon Martin, Michael Brown and Floyd — citing them as victims of systemic racism in America.

=== Richmond ===
On June 6, around 350 protesters took to Main Street in Richmond. Also in attendance to show their support for the protest and its ideals was Richmond Police Chief James Ebert and Richmond Mayor Robert Blythe, who both gave speeches.

=== Russellville ===
A group from Russellville, Kentucky called '5th and More" worked together to put on a peaceful protest and march in their city on June 7. The protest included a wide range of speakers and included Charles Neblett, who had been marching for civil rights since the 1960s.

=== Winchester ===
Protesters lined parts of Main Street in downtown Winchester on May 31, calling for an end to police brutality.
