= 240th Cavalry Regiment =

240th Cavalry
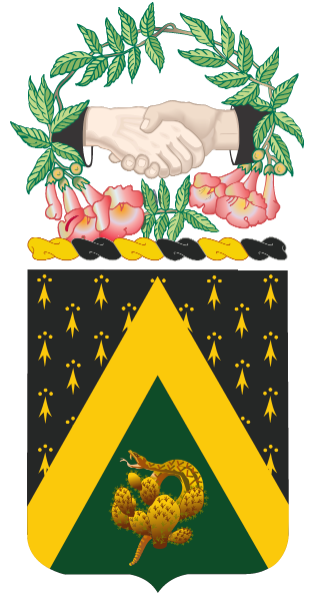
- Coat of Arms of the 240th Cavalry
- Active: 1980–1985
- Country: United States
- Branch: United States Army
- Type: Reconnaissance (Parent regiment under Combat Arms Regimental System)
- Part of: 149th Armored Brigade (Troop A)
- Garrison/HQ: Owensboro (Troop A) (1980–1985)
- Motto: "Fight to Defend"

Commanders
- Notable commanders: Norman E. Arflack

Insignia
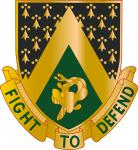
- Distinctive Unit Insignia

The 240th Cavalry (Kentucky Mounted Rifles) was a United States Army parent cavalry regiment, represented in the Kentucky Army National Guard by Troop A, 240th Cavalry, part of the 149th Armored Brigade, stationed at Owensboro.

Constituted in 1980, the regiment was disbanded in 1985.

== History ==
The regiment was constituted on 3 September 1980 as the 240th Cavalry, a Combat Arms Regimental System (CARS) parent regiment in the Kentucky Army National Guard. It was partially organized on 1 November 1980 to consist of Troop A at Owensboro, part of the 149th Armored Brigade. The troop was the armored cavalry reconnaissance troop of the brigade, which was brought to full strength due to the Kentucky Army National Guard reaching its authorized strength in 1980. The troop was originally constituted on 13 May 1946 as the Headquarters, Headquarters and Service Company of the 201st Engineer Combat Battalion in the Kentucky National Guard, and organized and Federally recognized on 24 August 1949 at Owensboro. It was ordered into active Federal service on 1 May 1951 during the Korean War but did not go overseas. The battalion became the 201st Engineer Battalion on 8 June 1953 and the company was released from active duty and reverted to state control on 30 March 1955. On 1 October 1959, it was redesignated as the Headquarters and Headquarters Company of the 123rd Armor's 2nd Medium Tank Battalion. Company A, 240th Tank Battalion was among the Owensboro units consolidated to form the HHC of the battalion. The company was ordered into active Federal service on 15 October 1961 during the Berlin Crisis to replace units that had been deployed to Germany at Fort Stewart. After tensions lowered, the company was released from active service and reverted to state control on 11 August 1962. On 6 April 1964, the battalion became the 2nd Battalion, 123rd Armor.

Between April 1982 and August 1983, the troop was commanded by Captain Norman E. Arflack, later assistant adjutant general of the Kentucky Army National Guard. Troop A was redesignated as Company D, 2nd Battalion, 123rd Armor on 1 November 1985 during a reorganization of the Kentucky Army National Guard. This came as a result of the 149th Armored Brigade losing its status as a separate brigade upon joining the reactivated 35th Infantry Division (Mechanized); the 35th's reconnaissance capability was provided by Nebraska's 1st Squadron, 167th Cavalry.
