= 149th Maneuver Enhancement Brigade =

- 149th Maneuver Enhancement Brigade shoulder sleeve insignia
- Active: 21 January 1839–17 May 1846 (Kentucky Militia); 17 May 1846–17 May 1847 (Kentucky Volunteers); 30 June 1851–14 September 1864 (3d Kentucky Vol. Inf.); 15 October 1878–27 November 1900 (1st Kentucky Vol. Inf.); 27 May 1904–8 January 1919 (138th Field Artillery); 30 June 1922–1 March 1968 (138th Field Artillery); 1 March 1968– 1 November 1985 (149th Armored); 1 November 1985–1 September 2008 (149th Infantry); 1 September 2008–present (149th MEB)
- Country: United States
- Branch: Army_National_Guard
- Role: Maneuver Enhancement
- Size: Brigade
- Part of: Kentucky Army National Guard
- Garrison/HQ: Richmond Armed Forces Reserve Center, Richmond, Kentucky
- Nickname: Louisville Legion
- Engagements: Mexican–American War; Monterey; Civil War; Shiloh; Murfreesboro; Chickamauga; Atlanta; Mississippi 1862; Tennessee 1863; War with Spain; Puerto Rico; World War I; World War II; New Guinea; Leyte; Luzon
- Decorations: Philippine Presidential Unit Citation; Meritorious Unit Commendation (Army)
- Website: https://ky.ng.mil/Army-Guard/149th-MEB/

Commanders
- Current commander: Col. Terry Durham
- Command Sergeant Major: CSM Aaron Lester

Insignia
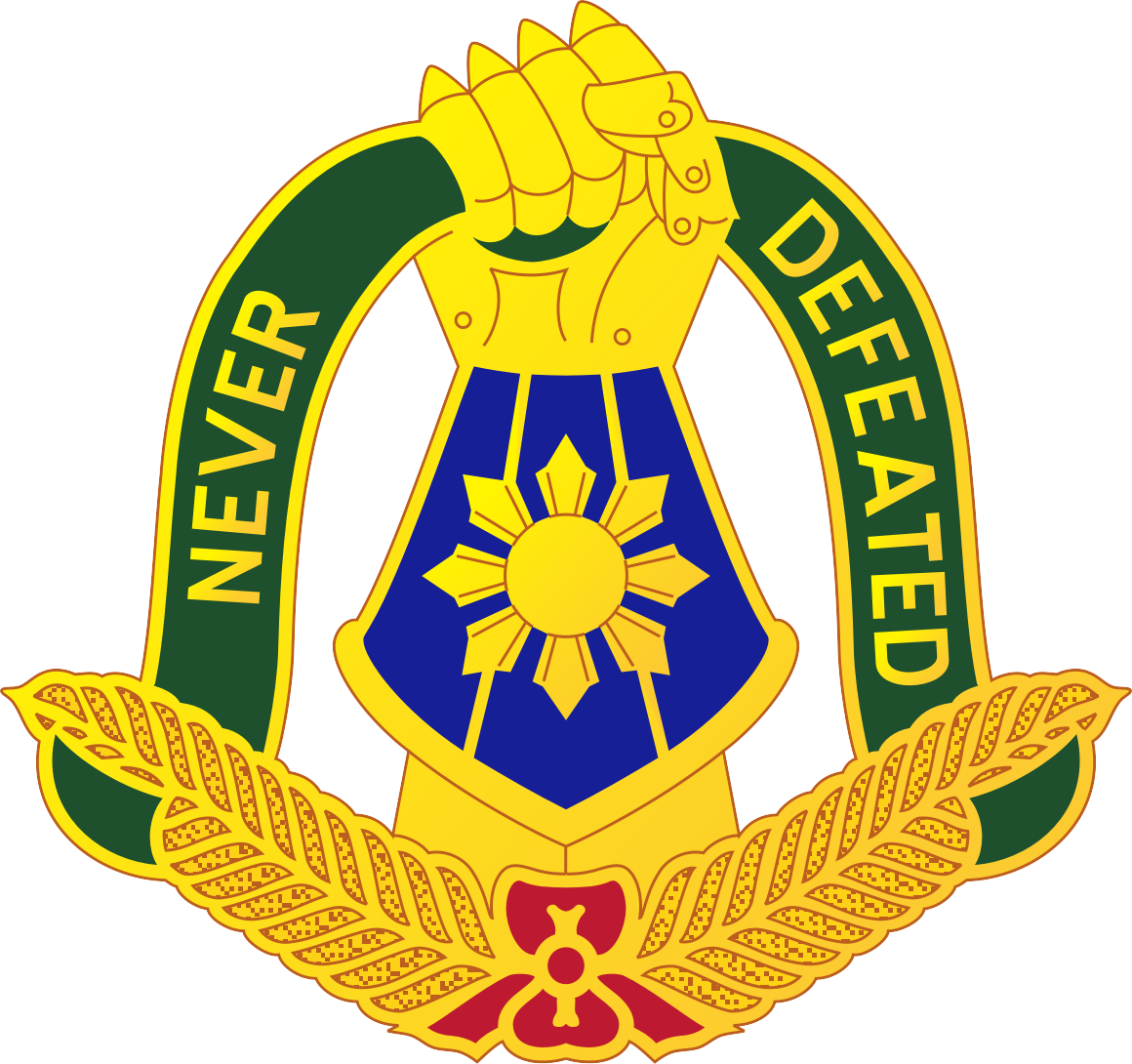
- Distinctive Unit Insignia

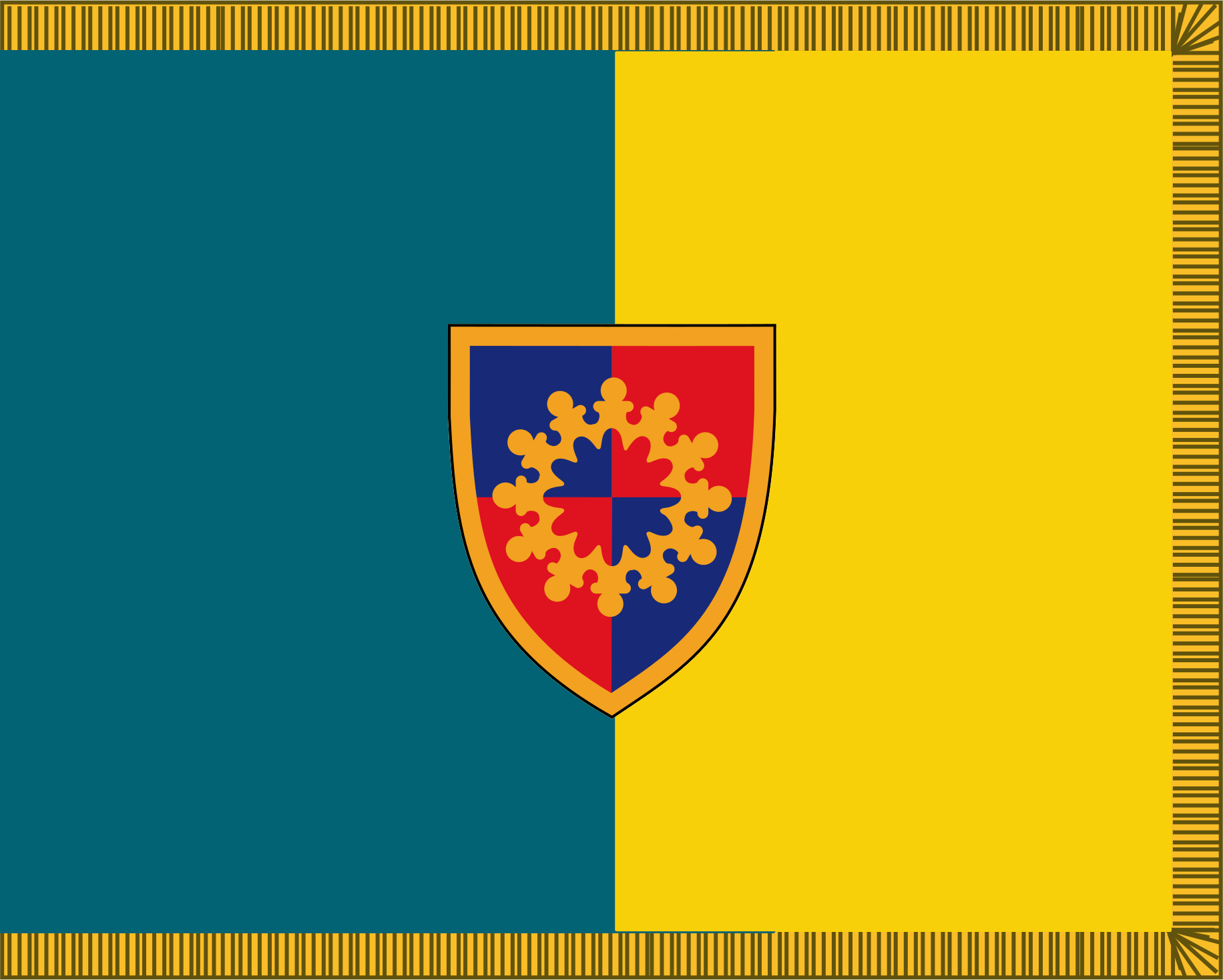
- 149th Maneuver Enhancement Brigade Flag

The 149th Maneuver Enhancement Brigade is a maneuver enhancement brigade of the Kentucky Army National Guard, headquartered at Richmond.

Constituted Jan. 21, 1839 in the Kentucky Militia as the Louisville Legion and organized at Louisville. The unit mustered into federal service May 17, 1846 as the first Kentucky Volunteer Infantry Regiment and mustered out of federal service May 17, 1847 in New Orleans, Louisiana. Four years after coming out of the federal service, the unit reorganized June 30, 1851 in the Kentucky Volunteer Militia in Louisville as the Louisville Legion. The Kentucky State Guard re-designated as the Kentucky National Guard in 1912, and the unit mustered into federal service once again at Fort Thomas in February 1917.

The 149th Armored Brigade traces its recent history to the activation of Headquarters and Headquarters Battery, XXIII Corps Artillery from Headquarters and Headquarters Battery, 138th Field Artillery Group on 1 October 1959. The corps artillery headquarters for the Kentucky Army National Guard had been formed in 1953 due to the quantity of field artillery battalions in the state and given the designation of XXIII Corps Artillery, although the corresponding corps headquarters did not exist. In this reorganization, the Louisville unit swapped designations with the Lexington unit, which ultimately became the 138th Field Artillery Brigade headquarters.

The Louisville unit was then converted and redesignated HHC 149th Armored Brigade on 1 November 1980. The '149' number came from the former 149th Infantry Regiment. When activated, the 149th included the 1st and 2nd Battalions of the 123rd Armor, 1st Battalion, 149th Infantry, 2nd Battalion, 138th Field Artillery, Troop A of the 240th Cavalry, the 103rd Support Battalion, and the 207th Engineer Company.

On 1 November 1985 the 149th joined the newly reactivated 35th Infantry Division (Mechanized) and became the 149th Brigade, 35th Infantry Division. The 35th had been reformed after the Department of Defense decided to add another National Guard mechanized division and also included the 67th Brigade from Nebraska and the 69th Brigade from Kansas. As a result of losing its status as a separate brigade, the brigade armored cavalry reconnaissance troop (Troop A, 240th Cavalry) was eliminated. The 149th MEB also includes the 198th Military Police Battalion. The 198th MP Battalion has several combat support units, and one law and order detachment.

The unit's headquarters changed 1 October 2013 to Richmond, Kentucky.
