= Sadiqa Reynolds =

American attorney

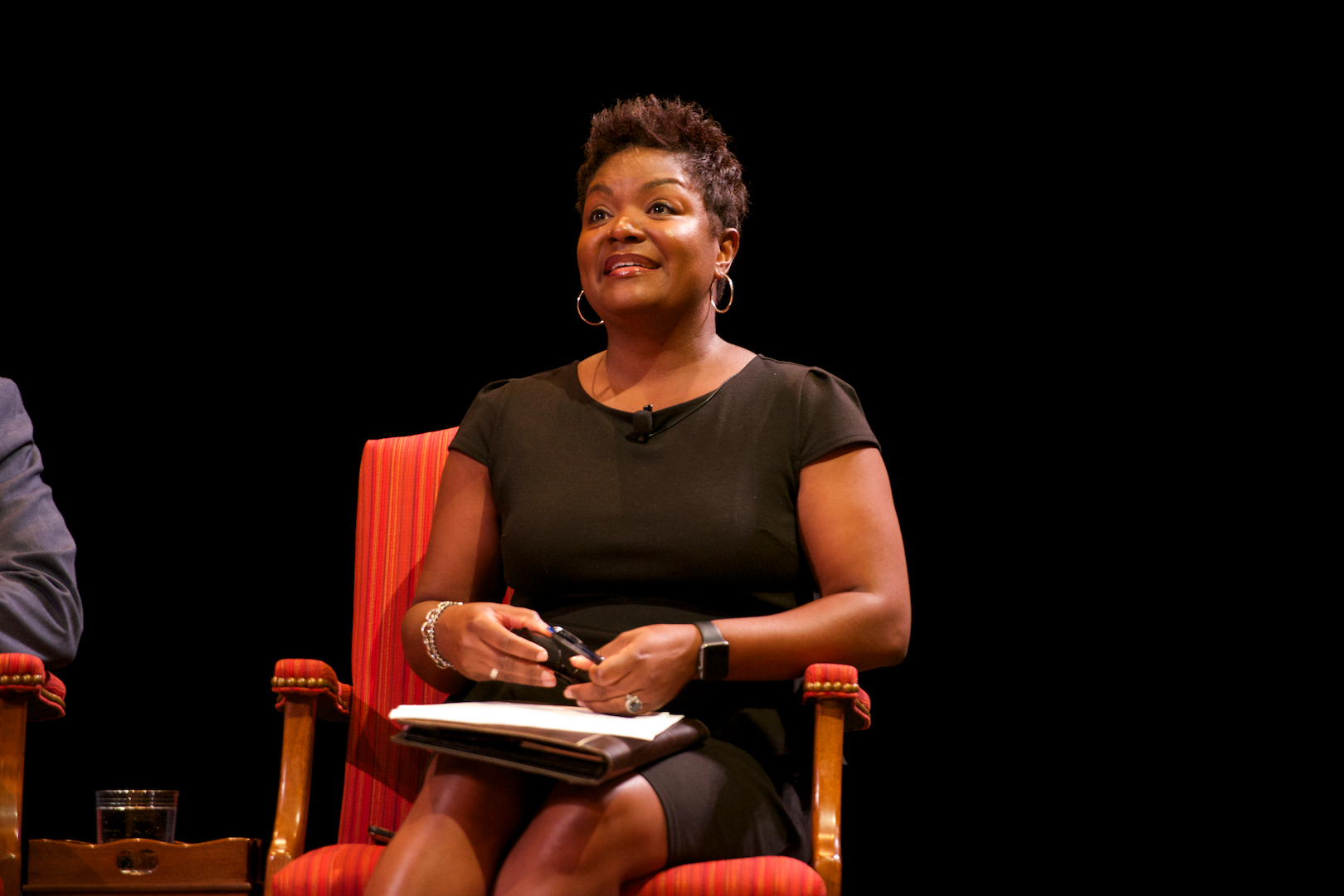
- Born: January 30, 1972 (age 54); The Bronx, New York
- Citizenship: United States
- Education: University of Louisville (BS); University of Kentucky (JD)
- Occupations: Lawyer, CEO

Sadiqa Reynolds is an American attorney and social justice advocate. She is the current CEO of the Perception Institute, and the former president of the Louisville Urban League. Reynolds served as the first African American Inspector General for the state of Kentucky.

== Early life and education ==
Reynolds was born in the Bronx, New York, in 1972. She grew up in the South Bronx. She moved to Kentucky with her mother when she was 5. Her mother worked at GTE as a telephone operator. According to Reynolds, "I would just dial zero and ask to speak to my mother.”

Reynolds earned her bachelor's degree in psychology from the University of Louisville in 1993 and later earned her Juris Doctor degree from the University of Kentucky. She is also a member of Delta Sigma Theta.

== Career ==
Reynolds was named Inspector General for Kentucky in 2008. Prior to that, she ran a private law practice. In 2009, Reynolds was appointed a District Judge in Jefferson County by Governor Steve Beshear. Reynolds was also the first African American women to clerk for the Kentucky Supreme Court.

Reynolds became president and CEO of the Louisville Urban League in 2015. She was the first female to serve as president across the organization's 101-year history. Reynolds is credited with increasing the League's budget and staff, helping with development of the Louisville Urban Sports and Learning Campus, and championing Black-owned businesses.

In 2022, Reynolds became CEO of the Perception Institute, a company focused on combating bias and discrimination.

== Social advocacy ==
During her time as a lawyer, Reynolds provided pro bono hours representing "domestic violence victims and other disadvantaged citizens".

In 2020, following the fatal shooting of David McAtee by the Kentucky Army National Guard in Louisville during nationwide protests following the murder of George Floyd and the killing of Breonna Taylor, Reynolds recruited a local gospel singer to sing "Amazing Grace" after the coroner removed McAtee's body. Reynolds helped by distributing masks and assisting teenagers involved in the protest, saying: "I'm proud of these young people for doing what they need to do, and I'm proud of those in my generation, the 40-somethings ... that are here to protect [the younger generation]."

== Awards and honors ==
- In 2016, Reynolds received the Fannie Lou Hamer Award for Justice
- In 2017, Reynolds was named Louisville Magazine's Person of the Year for her work in raising money for the Norton Healthcare Sports and Learning Center
- In 2017, Reynolds was named Community Leader of the Year by the National Alliance on Mental Illness for her work on reducing stigma surrounding mental health
- In 2019, Reynolds was named Small Business Leader of the Year by Greater Louisville Inc.
- In 2023, Reynolds received the Gertrude E. Rush Award for her justice advocacy work from the National Bar Association
- In 2023, Reynolds was named as one of USA Today's Women of the Year, which recognizes women who have made a significant impact across the country
