= Daniel Bruce =

Daniel Bruce may refer to:

- Daniel Bruce (footballer, born 1868) (1868–1931), Scotland international footballer
- Daniel Bruce (footballer, born 1996), English footballer
- Daniel D. Bruce (1950–1969), U.S. Marine
- Daniel Bruce (chef), founder of the Boston Wine Festival
- Daniel Bruce (curler) (born 1999), Newfoundland and Labrador curler
