= Daniel D. Bruce =

United States Marine

Daniel Dean Bruce
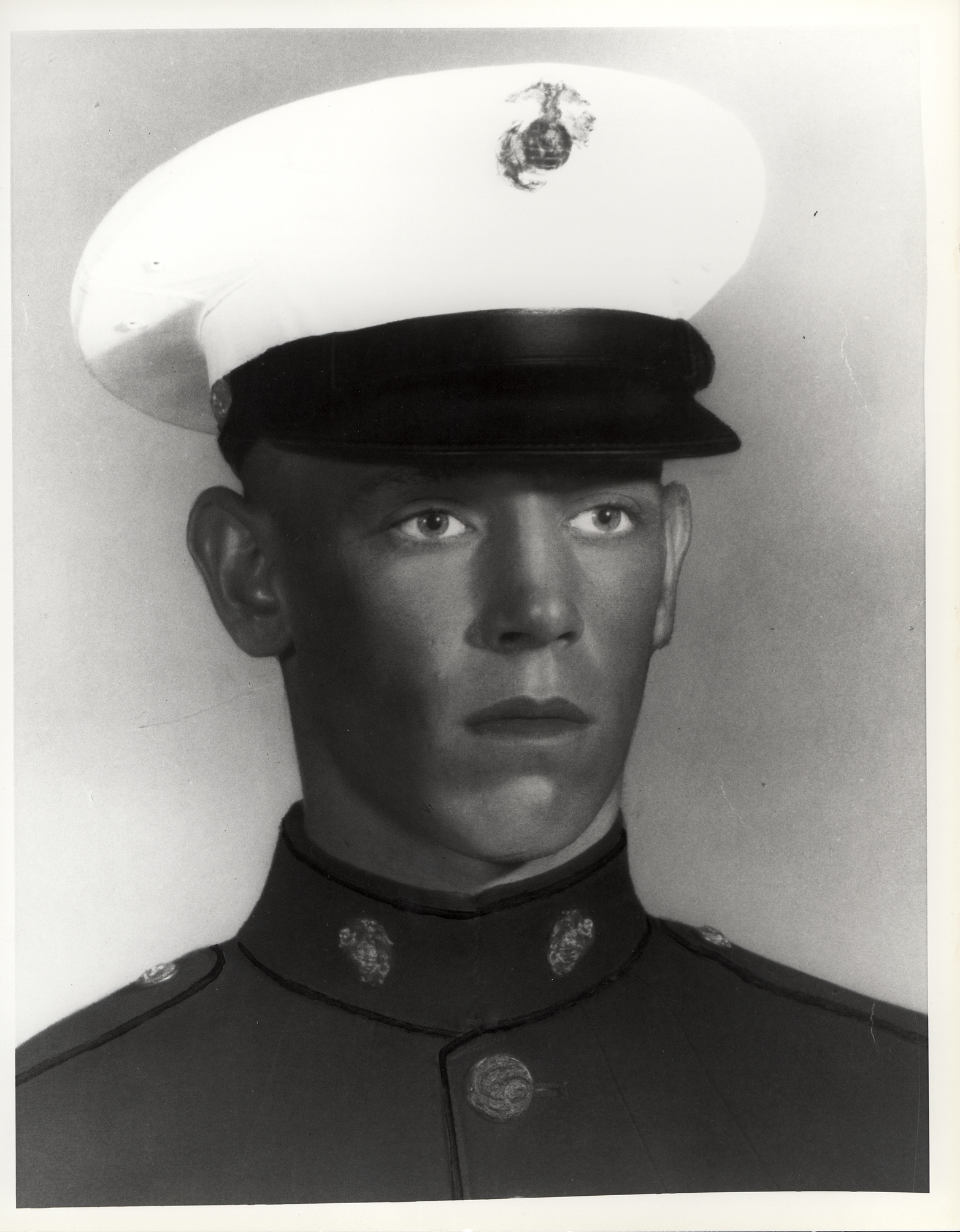
- Daniel D. Bruce, Medal of Honor recipient
- Born: May 18, 1950; Michigan City, Indiana, US
- Died: March 1, 1969 (aged 18); Firebase Tomahawk, Quang Nam Province, Republic of Vietnam
- Burial place: Greenwood Cemetery, Michigan City, Indiana
- Military career
- Allegiance: United States of America
- Branch: United States Marine Corps
- Service years: 1968–1969
- Rank: Private First Class
- Units: Headquarters and Service Company, 3rd Battalion, 5th Marines, 1st Marine Division
- Conflicts: Vietnam War †
- Awards: Medal of Honor; Purple Heart

Daniel Dean Bruce (May 18, 1950 – March 1, 1969) was a United States marine who posthumously received the Medal of Honor for heroism in Vietnam.

Bruce joined the Marines in 1968, and was deployed to Vietnam in January 1969. Two months later, on March 1, 1969, Bruce was on night watch at Firebase Tomahawk in Quang Ngai Province when an enemy explosive charge was thrown at his position. The private first class caught it, held it close to his body, and ran from his position, where the grenade exploded and killed Bruce. This action saved the lives of three other marines.

== Early life and education ==
Daniel Bruce was born on May 18, 1950, in Michigan City, Indiana, where he attended Garfield Grammar School, Barker Jr. High School, and Elston Sr. High School.

He enlisted in the U.S. Marine Corps Reserve in Chicago, Illinois on May 20, 1968, and was discharged to enlist in the regular Marine Corps on July 17, 1968.

== Career ==
Upon completion of recruit training with the 2nd Recruit Training Battalion, Recruit Training Regiment, Marine Corps Recruit Depot San Diego, California in September 1968, he was transferred to the Marine Corps Base Camp Pendleton, California. He completed individual combat training with Company U, 3rd Battalion, 2nd Infantry Training Regiment in November, and basic infantry training with Weapons Company, Basic Infantry Training Battalion, 2nd Infantry Training Regiment in December.

On January 1, 1969, Bruce was promoted to private first class, and later that month was ordered to the Republic of Vietnam. He was assigned duty as anti-tank assault man with Headquarters and Service Company, 3rd Battalion, 5th s, 1st Division.

== Death ==
While participating in combat at Firebase Tomahawk, Quang Nam Province, on March 1, 1969, he was killed in action — for his gallantry on this occasion, which saved the lives of three fellow marines, he was awarded the Medal of Honor. He was on night watch when an enemy explosive was thrown at his position. He caught the charge, held it to his body, and ran from his position — away from fellow Marines who would have been killed by the explosion. Seconds later, the charge exploded and the full force of the blast was absorbed by Bruce, killing him instantly.

== Decorations ==
A complete list of his medals and decorations includes: the Medal of Honor, the Purple Heart, the National Defense Service Medal, the Vietnam Service Medal with one bronze star, and the Republic of Vietnam Campaign Medal.

Medal of Honor		Purple Heart
National Defense Service Medal	Vietnam Service Medal with bronze star	Vietnam Campaign Medal

== Medal of Honor citation ==
The President of the United States in the name of The Congress takes pride in presenting the MEDAL OF HONOR to posthumously to

PRIVATE FIRST CLASS DANIEL D. BRUCE
UNITED STATES MARINE CORPS

for service as set forth in the following CITATION:

For conspicuous gallantry and intrepidity at the risk of his life above and beyond the call of duty while serving as a Mortar Man with Headquarters and Service Company, Third Battalion, Fifth s, First Marine Division, against the enemy in the Republic of Vietnam. Early on the morning of March 1, 1969, Private First Class Bruce was on watch in his night defensive position at Fire Support Base Tomahawk in Quang Nam Province when he heard movements ahead of him. An enemy explosive charge was thrown toward his position and he reacted instantly, catching the device and shouting to alert his companions. Realizing the danger to the adjacent position with its two occupants Private First Class Bruce Held the device to his body and attempted to carry it from the vicinity of the entrenched marines. As he moved away, Private First Class Bruce's indomitable courage, inspiring valor and selfless devotion to duty saved the lives of three of his fellow marines and upheld the highest traditions of the Marine Corps and the United States Naval Service. He gallantly gave his life for his country.

/S/RICHARD M. NIXON

== The Wall ==
Daniel Dean Bruce has his name inscribed on the Vietnam Veterans Memorial on panel 31W, line 099.

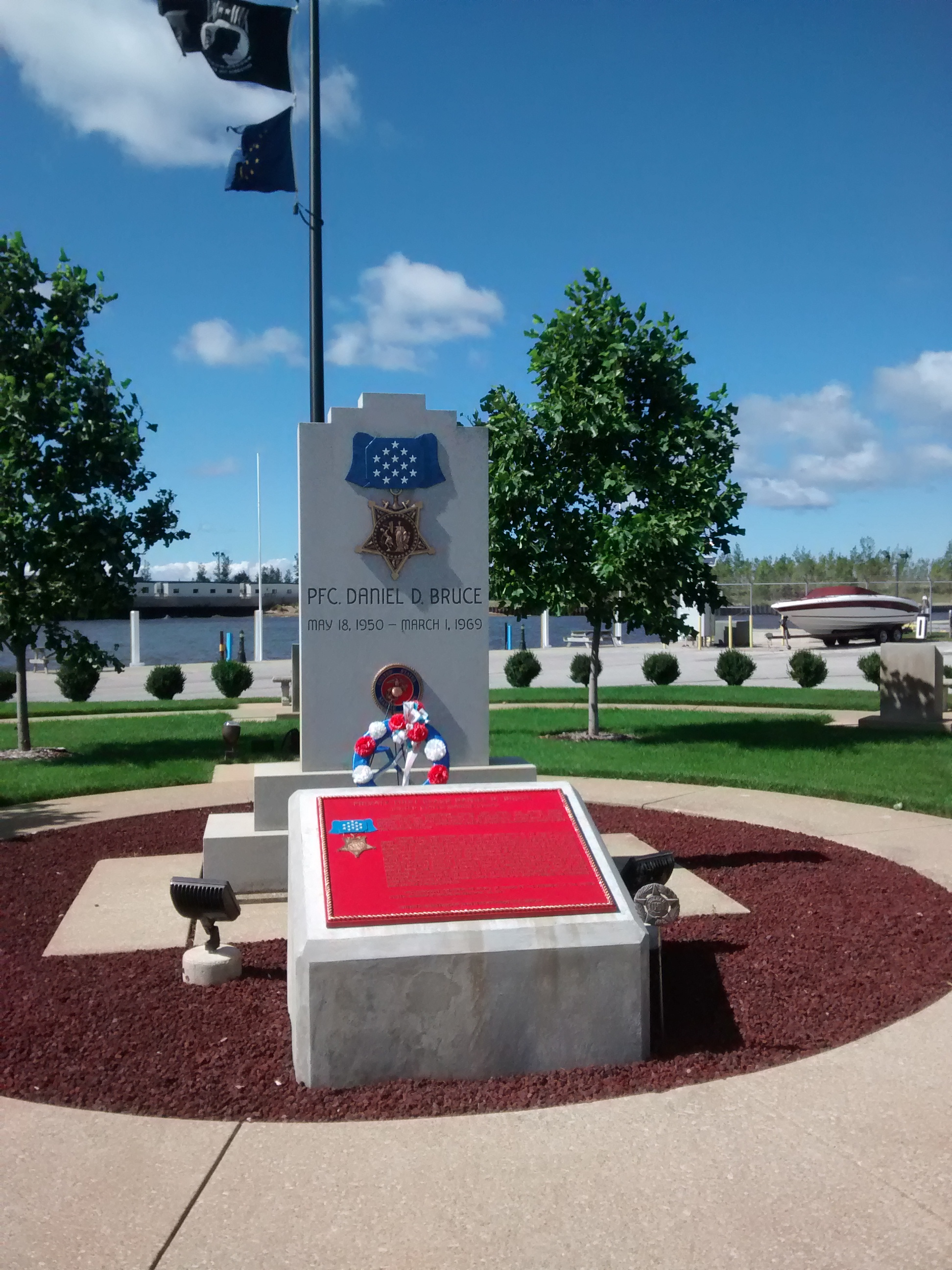
Monument to Daniel D. Bruce in his hometown of Michigan City, Indiana.

== See also ==
- List of Medal of Honor recipients
- List of Medal of Honor recipients for the Vietnam War
