= Not Fucking Around Coalition =

US black nationalist paramilitary organization

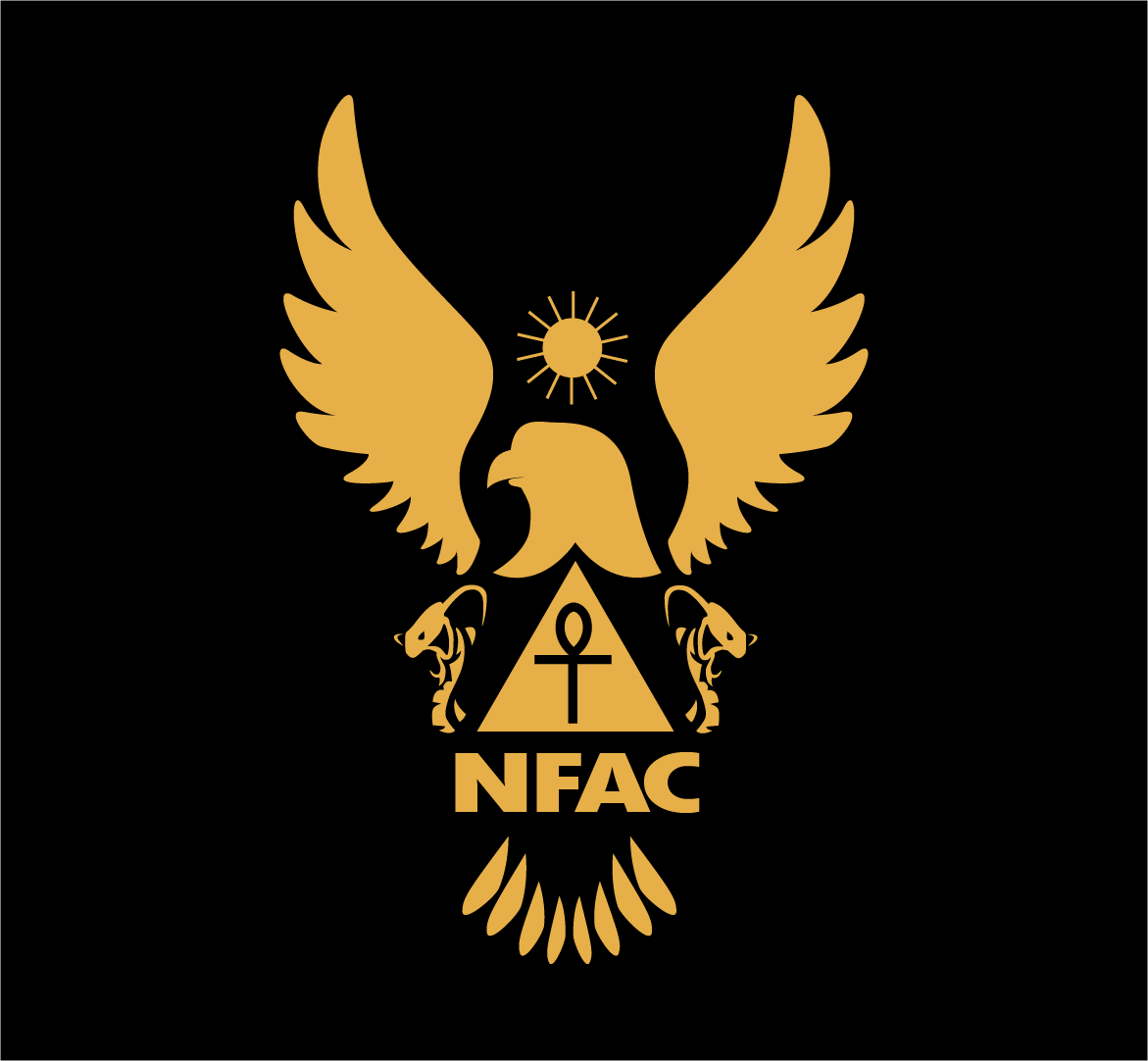
- Leader: John Fitzgerald Johnson (Grand Master Jay)
- Founded: 2017; 9 years ago
- Country: United States
- Active regions: Southern United States
- Ideology: Black nationalism Black separatism
- Status: Active

The Not Fucking Around Coalition (NFAC) is a black nationalist militia in the United States. The group advocates for black liberation and separatism. They distinguish themselves as different from the Black Panther Party or Black Lives Matter.

== Background and organization ==
John Fitzgerald Johnson, also known as Grand Master Jay and John Jay Fitzgerald Johnson, claims leadership of the group and has stated that it is composed of "ex military shooters." Johnson served in the Virginia National Guard and the Army from 1989 to 2006, leaving at the rank of private due to an other than honorable discharge. He was an independent candidate for U.S. president in 2016.

Johnson has stated: "We are a Black militia. We aren't protesters, we aren't demonstrators. We don't come to sing, we don't come to chant. That's not what we do." In the same interview, Johnson expressed Black Nationalist views, putting forth the view that the United States should either hand the state of Texas over to African-Americans so that they may form an independent country, or allow African-Americans to depart the United States to another country that would provide land upon which to form an independent nation.

In April 2021 Johnson expanded on this notion, telling The Atlantic that the intention of the NFAC was to establish the "United Black Kemetic Nation", a strictly black ethno-state.

In 2019, Johnson told the Atlanta Black Star that the organization was formed to prevent another Greensboro Massacre.

In 2020, Thomas Mockaitis, professor of history at DePaul University stated: "In one sense it (NFAC) echoes the Black Panthers but they are more heavily armed and more disciplined... So far, they've coordinated with police and avoided engaging with violence."

NFAC mandates that members have a concealed-carry permit or the ability to obtain one.

== Activities ==
The first reported appearance of NFAC members was a May 12, 2020, protest near Brunswick, Georgia, over the February murder of Ahmaud Arbery. They were identified by local media as "Black Panthers".

Johnson stated that NFAC provided armed security for the sister of Rayshard Brooks at her request. NFAC escorted her to a rally in downtown Atlanta in late June.

On the Fourth of July, 2020, local media reported that about 100 to 200 mostly armed NFAC members marched through Stone Mountain Park near Atlanta, Georgia, calling for the removal of the Confederate monument. Reuters reported the number of participants as "scores." The NFAC posted videos of the event and reported the number as 1,500. The Stone Mountain Memorial Association, which operates the park, stated that the protesters were peaceful and orderly.

Johnson stated of the site, which is important to the Ku Klux Klan: "Our initial goal was to have a formation of our militia in Stone Mountain to send a message that as long as you're abolishing all these statues across the country, what about this one?" He stated that the formation was a response to a threat by the KKK to start shooting black people at 8 pm on the Fourth of July, 2020. Johnson stated at the formation, "I want the heart of the Ku Klux Klan to hear me no matter where the fuck you are. I'm in your house. Where you at? You made a threat. We don't threaten."

On July 25, a local news outlet stated that "more than 300" members were gathered in Louisville, Kentucky to protest the lack of action against the officers responsible for the March killing of Breonna Taylor. The NFAC posted a video of the event on its official YouTube page, reporting the number of militia members registered and present as 3,500. On July 20, preceding the event, Kentucky Attorney General Daniel Cameron and Louisville Metro Council President David James had a phone conversation with Johnson, which the AG's office described as "productive".

In response to the announced NFAC presence, about 50 armed Three Percenters counter-protested. Louisville police in riot gear helped to facilitate the maintenance of space between the groups. Three NFAC members were wounded during a negligent weapon discharge. The NFAC said that the discharge occurred when a person who was not yet admitted into the formation collapsed from heat exhaustion and fired her weapon into the ground. The weapon was an older shotgun that Johnson said would not have been approved for the formation. The shotgun projectiles hit the ground, then ricocheted and hit three people. Johnson reported that two of those hit were checked by medics and cleared to continue to participate in the formation. However, police released a statement that only one militia member received minor injuries.The other two were transported to a hospital, the second was in serious but stable condition and the third was moved to the ICU and expected to survive.

On October 3, 2020, over 400 members of the NFAC along with over 200 other armed protesters marched in downtown Lafayette, Louisiana. This demonstration was sparked after United States Representative Clay Higgins made threats against protesters who showed up armed regarding the shooting of Trayford Pellerin at the hands of police. Johnson and other speakers gave speeches at the Parc San Souci, urging members to continue protesting. A protest attendee, not associated with the NFAC, was arrested after accidentally discharging a handgun. No one was injured. Afterwards, the group marched and left.

On November 2, 2020, Kansas City-based activist Keiajah Brooks announced via Twitter that she was under protection from the NFAC after multiple alleged instances of harassment committed by officers from the Kansas City Police Department. A week prior, she went viral online shortly after a video was released of her criticizing the local city commissioners for "choosing profits over people" as well as her push for the Police Chief Rick Smith to resign.

On December 3, 2020, Johnson was arrested by the FBI for allegedly aiming his rifle at police officers during protests about Breonna Taylor's killing. He was federally indicted on February 24, 2021, and was found guilty. In November 2022, he was sentenced to 7 years and 2 months in prison, with 3 years of supervision after completion of the term. He is currently incarcerated at Ashland FCI.

On June 23, 2021, former NFAC member Othal "Ozone" Wallace, 29, shot and killed Daytona Beach Police Department Officer Jason Raynor, 26, whilst he was responding a 911 call and checking a suspicious vehicle. He then attempted to disable the bodycam worn by the officer. Three days later, Wallace was arrested after police found out he was hiding at an alleged NFAC-affiliated property in DeKalb County, Georgia. According to Daytona Beach Police Chief Jakari Young, four other people were at the said property, along with multiple firearms, multiple flashbangs, body armor, and ammunition.

The NFAC stated Othal Wallace was terminated from the organization on January 21, 2021. They said they were not affiliated with the property as reported, claiming that it was owned by another ex-NFAC member. In October 2023, Othal Wallace was sentenced to 30 years in prison for the murder of the police officer.

== See also ==
- 2020–2021 United States racial unrest
- 2020 George Floyd Protests
