= 149th Infantry Regiment (United States) =

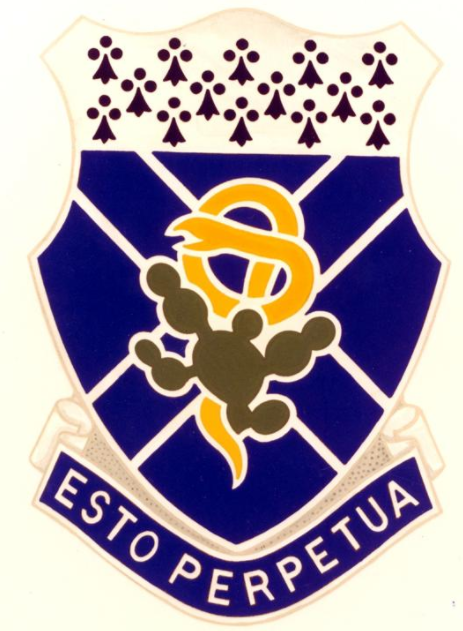
- 149th Infantry Regiment Distinctive Unit Insignia
- Active: 22 May 1846
- Country: United States
- Allegiance: United States(1846-present); Confederate States (1861-1865)
- Branch: United States Army
- Type: National Guard Regiment
- Garrison/HQ: Louisville, Kentucky (headquarters)
- Motto: "Never Defeated"
- Colors: Red and Gold
- Engagements: Mexican–American War -Battle of Monterrey; American Civil War -Battle of Shiloh -First Battle of Murfreesboro -Battle of Chickamauga -Battle of Atlanta -Siege of Corinth -Battle of Franklin; Spanish–American War -Puerto Rico Campaign; World War I World War II -Battle of Leyte -Battle of Luzon US Afghanistan War

Commanders
- Notable commanders: Winfred G. Skelton

The 149th Infantry Regiment was an infantry regiment of the United States Army, provided by the Kentucky Army National Guard. It was originally constituted 22 May 1846 in the Kentucky Militia as the 1st Kentucky Cavalry and the 2d Kentucky Volunteer Infantry. After a year of Federal service (June 1846 to June 1847), it was reorganized on 15 June 1860 in the Kentucky State Guard as the Lexington Battalion (which included the Lexington Rifles). It was then expanded in November 1860 to comprise the Lexington Battalion and the Kentucky River Battalion. The Lexington and Kentucky River Battalions, antecedents to the 149th Infantry, are especially notable in military history in that they were some of the few military units to ever be split between two different countries for the duration of a war.

== Service career ==
=== American Civil War ===
In 1861, after the outbreak of the American Civil War, the 149th Infantry Regiment (at the time part of the Kentucky State Militia and comprising the Lexington Battalion and the Kentucky River Battalion), was split between the Union and the Confederacy by the Kentucky General Assembly. The reason for this was the Kentucky State Government had declared neutrality in the war. They were officially recognized as part of both countries, and, although Kentucky never officially seceded from the United States, many soldiers within the state militia held Confederate sympathies. This was made more complicated when President Abraham Lincoln began drafting soldiers to fight the Confederacy, as they needed military units to join. To prevent the collapse of the Kentucky State Militia, the General Assembly voted to split the entire militia in half. This included the antecedents of the 149th Infantry Regiment. Between April–June 1861, soldiers with Union sympathies were reorganized as the 1st and 2nd Volunteer Kentucky Infantry regiments, while soldiers with Southern sympathies were reorganized into the 1st Kentucky Brigade (The Orphan Brigade).

The two halves of the Kentucky Militia only fought each other once, at the Battle of Shiloh.

=== World War I ===
The history of the unit designated the 149th Infantry goes back to 28 April 1917. But the History of the 149th Infantry correctly states that, as the 2nd Kentucky, the regiment had many years of service before 1917.

The 38th Division deployed to Europe in October 1918, where it landed in France at the height of the German "Peace Offensives". Because the division was not combat ready, it was largely stripped of officers and men, who served as replacements for units already in combat. The 149th Infantry Regiment was broken up in this way to provide replacements.

=== Interwar period ===
The 149th Infantry arrived at the port of New York on 16 January 1919 on the troopship SS Belgic and was demobilized in January 1919 at Camp Zachary Taylor, Kentucky. Per the National Defense Act of 1920, the 149th Infantry was reconstituted in the National Guard in 1921, assigned to the 38th Division, and allotted to the state of Kentucky. It was partially organized 1 July 1921 by redesignation of active elements of the 1st Infantry, Kentucky National Guard (organized 1919–21). The regimental headquarters was organized 1 July 1922 and federally recognized at Frankfort, Kentucky. The headquarters was relocated 13 December 1927 to Louisville, Kentucky. The regiment, or elements thereof, called up to perform the following state duties: strike duty at coal fields near Newport, Kentucky, and at the Anderson Steel and Newport Rolling Mills, 25 December 1921–31 March 1922; Central City, Kentucky, 8 July–30 August 1922; Corbin, Kentucky, 30 September 1922–15 February 1923; and again at Newport, 2 February–24 April 1923; preserve law and order at Sand Cave, Kentucky, 2 February–18 March 1925, during the rescue attempt to save the celebrated cave explorer, Floyd Collins; 2nd Battalion and elements of 1st Battalion for preservation of order at a civil trial at Lexington, Kentucky, 1–2 February 1926, and at a trial in Louisville, 22–28 April 1926; flood relief duty at Hickman, Kentucky, 16 April–27 May 1927; 3rd Battalion for preservation of order at a rape trial of two Negro men at Madisonville, Kentucky, 23–26 November 1927; entire regiment for strike duty at coal miners’ strike in Harlan County, Kentucky, 6 May–30 June 1931; flood relief along the Ohio River, January–March 1937. Conducted annual summer training most years at Camp Knox, Kentucky, 1921–39.

=== World War II ===
The 149th Infantry was inducted into active federal service on 17 January 1941 and moved to Camp Shelby, Mississippi, where it arrived on 26 January 1941. The 149th Infantry Regiment was in federal service until 9 November 1945.

=== Status today ===
The military unit has been active in the Louisville, Kentucky area since the 149th Infantry Regiment Combat Team was activated after World War II. The U.S. Army Center for Military History attributes lineage and honors to the Louisville unit further back than that.

It has the Special Designation 'Second Kentucky', commemorating its previous state designation. The numerical designation, but not the lineage or honors, is now carried on in the 149th Maneuver Enhancement Brigade.
