= Federal Service =

Term that refers to US National Guard members when called to active duty

Federal Service is a term applied to United States National Guard members and units when called to active duty to serve the federal government under Article I, Section 8 and Article II, Section 2 of the Constitution and the US Code, title 10 (Department of Defense), sections 12401 to 12408.

== See also ==
- National service
- Starship Troopers Federal Service
