= 138th Field Artillery Brigade =

- 138th Field Artillery Brigade SSI
- Active: 1839–1941; 1945–present
- Country: United States
- Branch: United States Army National Guard
- Type: Field Artillery
- Size: Brigade
- Part of: Kentucky Army National Guard
- Garrison/HQ: Lexington, Kentucky
- Nickname: Kentucky Thunder!
- Mottos: "Ready in Peace and War"; Arma Parato Fero (English: "I Carry Arms in Readiness")
- Colors: Scarlet and Yellow
- Decorations: Meritorious Unit Commendation

Commanders
- Commander: Robert S. Mattingly
- Command Sergeant Major: Robert P. Neathery

Insignia
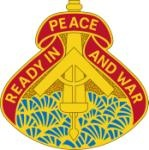
- Distinctive unit insignia

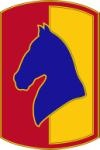
- Combat service identification badge

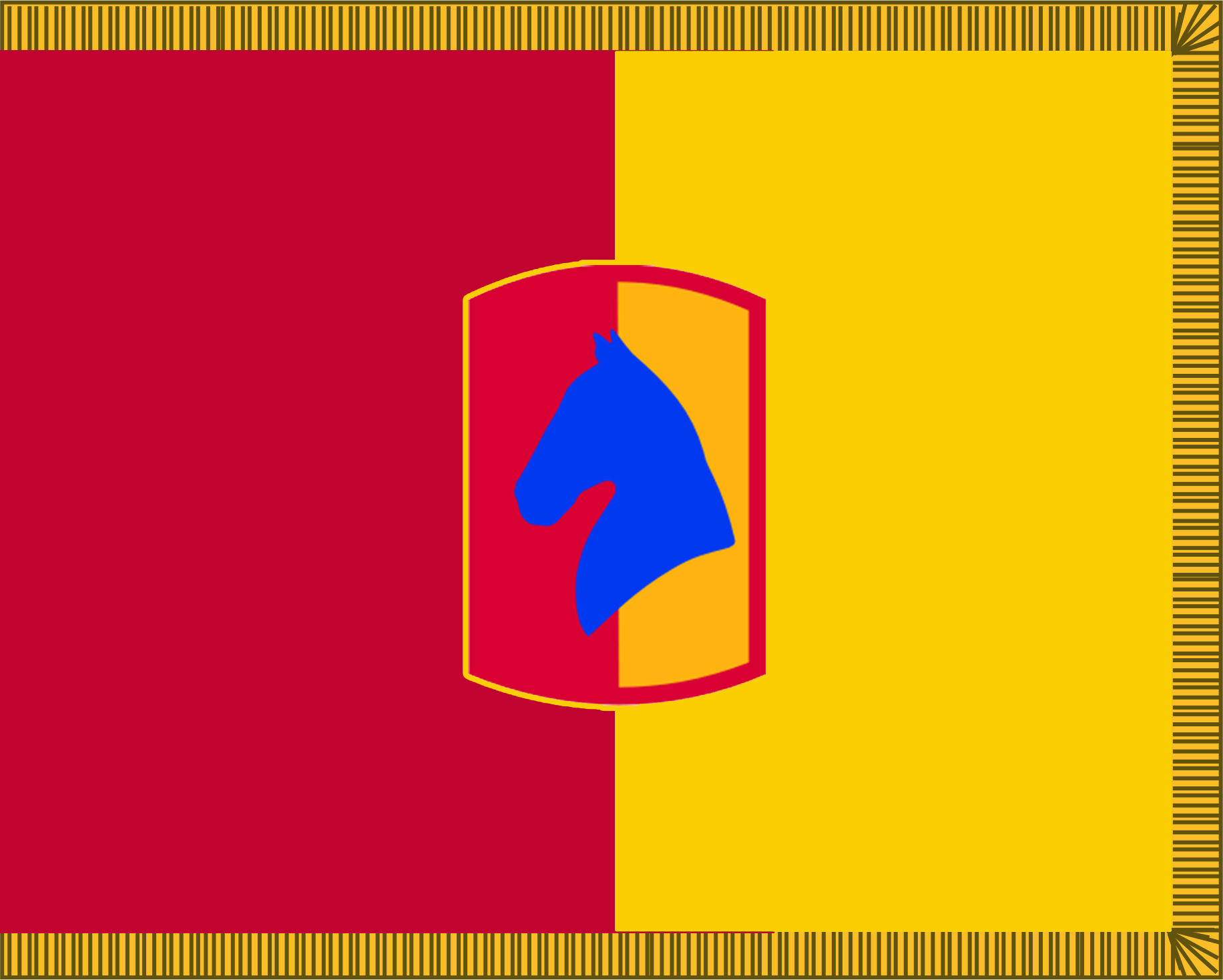
- 138th Field Artillery Brigade Flag

The 138th Field Artillery Brigade is a field artillery brigade of the United States Army. It is a component of the Kentucky Army National Guard. It is headquartered in Lexington, Kentucky.

== History ==
The brigade was originally organized on 21 January 1839 as the Louisville Legion, it was mustered into federal service on 17 May 1846, as the 1st Regiment of Foot, Kentucky Volunteers. It was redesignated and mustered into federal service on 9 September 1861 as the 5th Kentucky Volunteer Infantry, and fought at Shiloh, Murfeesborough, Chickamauga, Chattanooga, and Atlanta. The unit was recalled up into federal service on 18 June 1916, and sent to Hattiesburg, Mississippi, where it helped build Camp Shelby, that was named for the first Governor of Kentucky.

Converted and redesignated as the 138th Field Artillery Regiment, 38th Infantry Division on 9 October 1917, and demobilized on 8 January 1919 at Camp Taylor, Kentucky. The regiment was again inducted into federal service on 17 January 1941 at Louisville and sent to Camp Shelby, MS. The regiment was broken up on 1 March 1941 and HHB was disbanded. The 1st Battalion was designated as the 138th Field Artillery Battalion. The 2d BN was designated as the 198th Field Artillery Battalion. The HHB 138th Field Artillery Regiment was reconstituted on 25 August 1945, and on 13 May 1946 was redesignated as the HHB 138th Field Artillery Group. On 1 October 1959 the 138th Field Artillery Group was moved from Louisville to Lexington, and was redesignated on 1 July 1978 as the HHB, 138th Field Artillery Brigade.

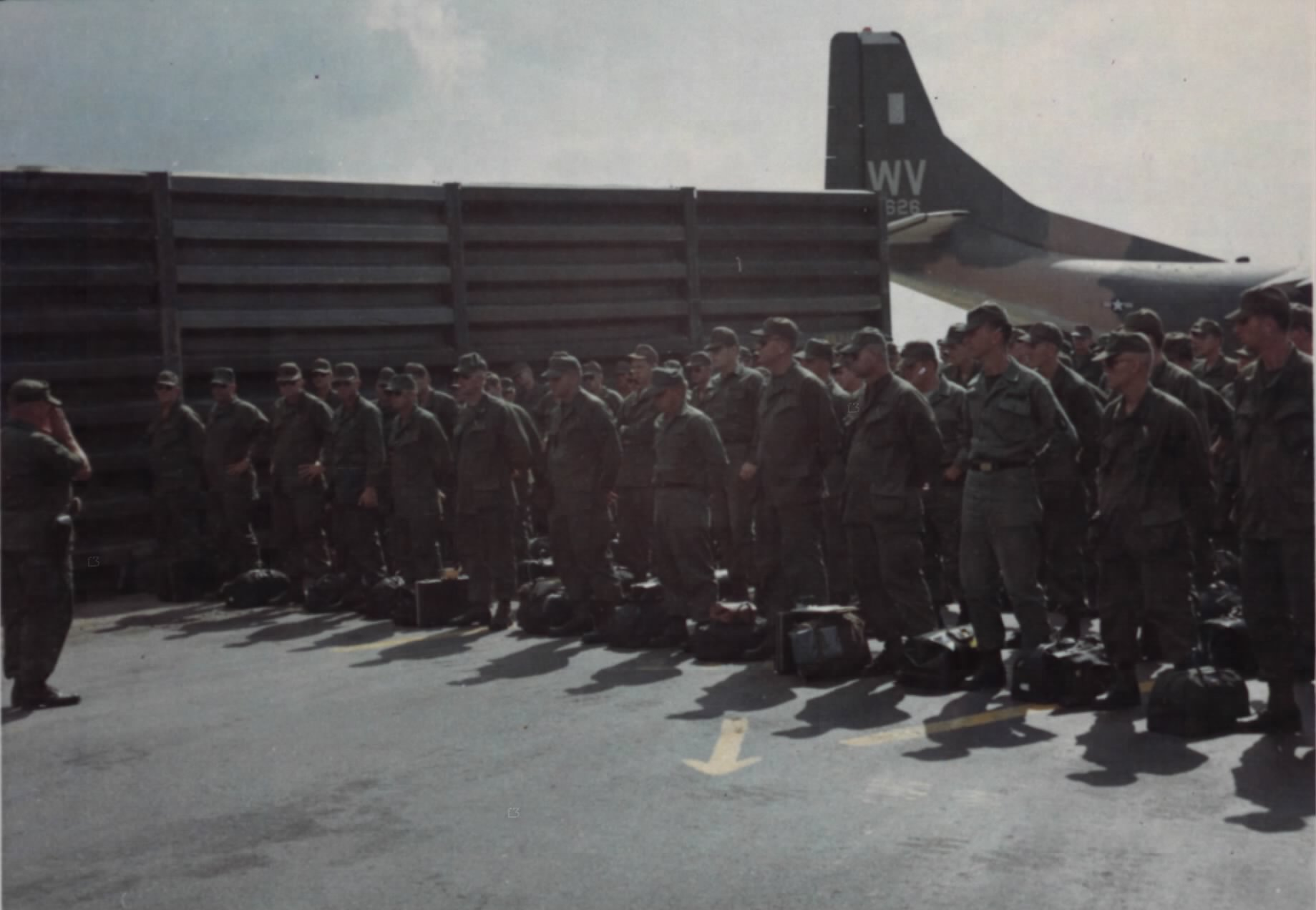
CO, 2nd Battalion, 138th Artillery, briefs his men following their arrival at Da Nang Air Base, 24 October 1968

On 19 April 1968, the 2nd Battalion of the 138th was deployed to South Vietnam to provide fire support to the 101st Airborne Division in northern South Vietnam. On 19 June 1969, their firebase, Firebase Tomahawk, was attacked by the North Vietnamese Army 4th Regiment. The attack was repulsed, with the 138th suffering 9 casualties, and the North Vietnamese suffering 23.

On 2 September 2006 the 138th Field Artillery Brigade was redesignated as the 138th Fires Brigade. On 7 July 2007, Soldiers of the 138th Fires Brigade were mobilized to Fort Sill, OK and deployed in Baghdad (during the War in Iraq), until 27 June 2008. On 1 September 2012, Soldiers from the brigade mobilized and deployed to Camp Lemmonier, Djibouti. Their task was to provide force protection and emergency response forces for the Combined Joint Task Force - Horn of Africa (CJTF-HOA).

On 12 August 2023, Soldiers from Brigade were mobilized to Fort Bliss, TX and deployed to multiple locations in Southwest Asia in support of Operation Spartan Shield and Operation Inherent Resolve. Their mission was to serve as the Force Field Artillery Headquarters for Combined Forces Land Component Commander.

In 2025, the 138th Field Artillery Brigade was reorganized as the 138th Operational Fires Command, reflecting a shift toward corps-level fires integration and multi-domain operations. The unit then participated in a command post exercise with U.S. Army V Corps, demonstrating its role in providing deep fires and integrating National Guard capabilities into large-scale combat operations.

== Structure ==
- 138th Field Artillery Brigade, in Lexington, Kentucky (Kentucky Army National Guard)
  - Headquarters Battery, in Lexington, Kentucky
  - 2nd Battalion, 138th Field Artillery Regiment (M109A6 Paladin), in Lexington, Kentucky
  - 1st Battalion, 623rd Field Artillery Regiment (M142 HIMARS), in Glasgow, Kentucky
  - 103rd Brigade Support Battalion, in Harrodsburg, Kentucky
  - 138th Signal Company, in Lexington, Kentucky
  - Battery E (Target Acquisition), 139th Field Artillery Regiment, in Indianapolis, Indiana (Indiana Army National Guard)

Two additional field artillery battalions of the brigade are under administrative control of other formations:

- 164th Air Defense Artillery Brigade, in Orlando, Florida (Florida Army National Guard)
  - 3rd Battalion, 116th Field Artillery Regiment (M142 HIMARS), in Plant City, Florida
- 219th Engineer Brigade, in Franklin, Indiana (Indiana Army National Guard)
  - 2nd Battalion, 150th Field Artillery Regiment (M777A2), in Bloomington, Indiana
