= Firebase Tomahawk =

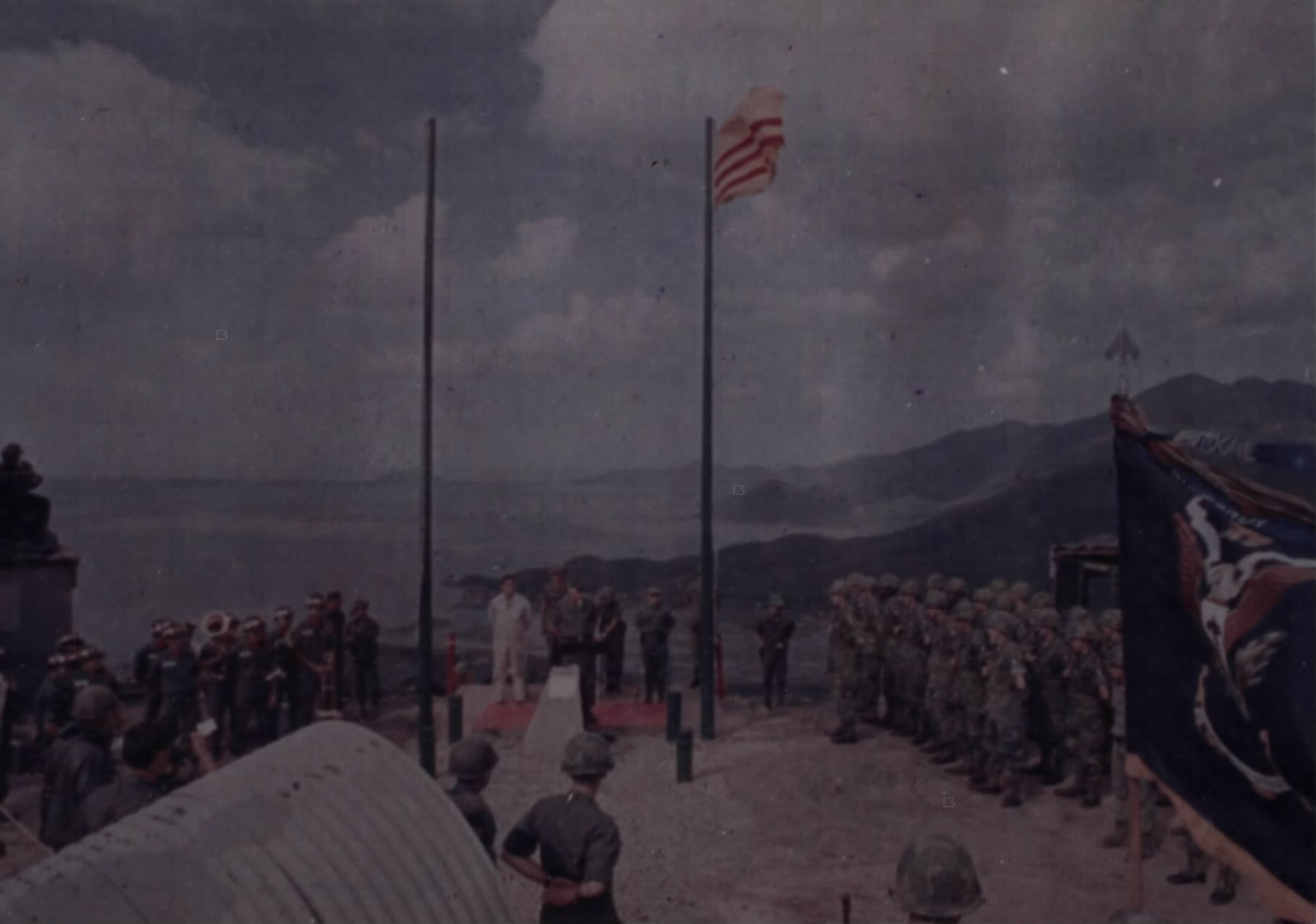
- Firebase Tomahawk handover, 15 November 1971

Site information
- Type: Army
- Condition: abandoned

Location
- Coordinates: 16.275°N 107.912°E

Site history
- Built: 1969
- In use: 1969
- Battles/wars: Vietnam War

Garrison information
- Occupants: 101st Airborne Division

Firebase Tomahawk (also known as Tomahawk Hill or Hill 132) was a U.S. Army firebase located in the Phú Lộc District southeast of Huế in central Vietnam.

== History ==
Tomahawk was constructed in 1969 by the units of the 101st Airborne Division near Phú Lộc approximately 40 km southeast of Huế beside Highway 1 north of the strategic Hải Vân Pass.

The base was occupied by the 2nd Battalion, 501st Infantry Regiment and 2nd Battalion, 138th Artillery when it was assaulted by the People's Army of Vietnam (PAVN) 4th Regiment on the night of 19 June 1969, the assault was repulsed for the loss of 13 U.S. (including 9 Kentucky Army National Guardsmen from the 138th Artillery) and 23 PAVN killed. This resulted in the deadliest battle for the United States Army National Guard in the Vietnam War.

Other units based at Tomahawk included:

- 327th Infantry

On 15 November 1971 at a ceremony attended by Major General Thomas M. Tarpley, Commanding General, 101st Airborne Division, Tomahawk was turned over by the 1st Battalion, 501st Infantry Regiment to the ARVN 5th Regional Forces.

== Current use ==
The base has reverted to jungle.
