= Killing of David McAtee =

2020 shooting in Louisville, Kentucky

- Part of George Floyd protests
- Date: June 1, 2020
- Time: 12:15 a.m. EST
- Venue: Food Mart parking lot
- Location: Louisville, Kentucky; 38.2527°N 85.7585°W
- Type: Shooting
- Outcome: Police chief Steve Conrad fired over handling of incident
- Deaths: David McAtee
- Suspects: LMPD: Katie Crews; Austin Allen; Kentucky National Guard: Andrew Kroszkewicz; Matthew Roark
- Charges: Pending investigation (federal)
- Litigation: Wrongful death lawsuit against LMPD and Kentucky Army National Guard pending

On June 1, 2020, David McAtee, a 53-year-old African-American man, was fatally shot by the Kentucky Army National Guard in Louisville during nationwide protests following the murder of George Floyd and the killing of Breonna Taylor. The Louisville Metro Police Department (LMPD) and National Guard were in the area to enforce a curfew. According to officials, the police and soldiers were fired upon by McAtee, and two Louisville officers and two National Guardsmen returned fire. McAtee was killed by a shot fired from a guardsman. The body cams of the police involved were deactivated during the shooting, in violation of department policy. Hours later, police chief Steve Conrad was fired by Louisville Mayor Greg Fischer.

== Biography ==
David McAtee was the youngest child of Odessa Riley and James McAtee, and had eight siblings. He owned and operated YaYa's BBQ Shack, a popular barbeque restaurant in Louisville's predominantly black West End neighborhood, a food desert, and was a "beloved fixture" of his community. He had a reputation for generosity, including serving food at no cost in his restaurant to police officers and members of his community who were struggling financially. Having de-escalated potentially violent situations on multiple occasions, he was also known as a calming presence in his neighborhood. He adopted the name YaYa after becoming a Rastafarian around 2010.

== Shooting ==
At the time of the shooting, a 9 p.m. curfew was in place due to protests following the recent murder of George Floyd and killing of Breonna Taylor by police officers. The LMPD and National Guard were attempting to disperse a crowd of people in and around the parking lot of Dino's Food Mart, a popular social gathering spot at a gas station across the street from McAtee's restaurant.

Witnesses in the crowd said the gathering was independent of the protests and was instead part of a weekly neighborhood social occasion at which McAtee served food. They allege that soldiers and police, in their effort to enforce the curfew, had boxed the crowd into the area thus causing a panic, which resulted in people running towards the restaurant. According to an LMPD statement, someone in the crowd opened fire at the armed officers and soldiers, who returned fire. A bullet shot by a National Guard soldier struck McAtee in the chest, killing him at the scene at about 12:15 a.m.

Following the shooting, hundreds of people stood near the restaurant, and McAtee's body remained lying at the scene for 12–14 hours while police investigated. After the coroner removed the body and the police departed, president of the Louisville affiliate of the National Urban League Sadiqa Reynolds recruited a local gospel singer to sing "Amazing Grace".

== Investigation ==
On June 1, Governor Andy Beshear ordered Kentucky State Police to investigate the shooting via a joint effort with the FBI Louisville Field Office and the U.S. Attorney Office for the Western District of Kentucky. On June 2, acting LMPD police chief Schroeder said that security camera footage showed McAtee firing a gun as officers approached his business while clearing out a nearby parking lot. According to Schroeder, questions remained, "including why did he fire and where were police at the time he fired?"

On June 4, videographic analysis by The New York Times' visual investigations unit of surveillance and bystander videos from four separate angles reconstructed a synchronized chronology of the sequence of events leading to McAtee's death. This analysis concluded that police first fired at least two pepper balls from outside McAtee's restaurant toward his relatives and him, in violation of LMPD policy requiring pepper balls be shot at the ground in front of the crowd (rather than into the crowd) during crowd dispersal operations, and that "law enforcement officials shall avoid the use of force" when trying to disperse non-violent crowds. One shot hit and pierced a bottle on an outdoor table, knocking it to the ground, and the other struck the doorway, almost hitting McAtee's niece in the head. At the time, the pepper ball shots may not have been distinguishable from other ammunition. In response, McAtee grabbed his gun and appears to have fired. The Guardian wrote that the video shows that McAtee "raises his arm in the air", which is "a motion consistent with firing a warning shot".

On June 9, the governor's office said that lab tests from the case concluded that McAtee was killed from a single gunshot by a National Guard soldier. In total, two officers and two guardsmen fired at least 19 shots in McAtee's direction. McAtee was determined to have fired twice with a 9 mm pistol. According to officials, McAtee's shots prompted law enforcement's return fire, which killed him. The officers involved in the shooting were identified as Katie Crews and Austin Allen, while the identities of the soldiers were not initially released.

In May 2021, Commonwealth Attorney Tom Wine released more information about the shooting. LMPD officer Crews fired eight times, officer Allen fired once, National Guard soldier Andrew Kroszkewicz fired four times, and staff sergeant Matthew Roark fired six times.

== Aftermath ==
Mayor Greg Fischer fired LMPD Chief Steve Conrad after learning that officers involved in the shooting of McAtee did not have their body cameras turned on. Deputy Chief Robert Schroeder was placed in charge of the department as the interim police chief and declared that the officers' decision to not use their body cameras was a "clear failure to (follow) our policy" and was "completely unacceptable."

Many residents and protesters raised concerns about why so many officers and troops were at the location, as the most significant protest that night was roughly 20 blocks away. They have also stated that the group wasn't protesting but were, instead, customers of the store and BBQ cart. Others have raised questions about why rubber bullets had been used in the Highlands but real bullets in the West End.

Crews became the subject of a professional standards investigation on June 2 after she posted a photo on social media of a protester offering her flowers during a protest on May 28. The photo depicts Crews standing in a police line with other officers, while a white female protester holds flowers near Crews' chest. Crews captioned the photo with "I hope the pepper balls that she got lit up with a little later on hurt" and claimed that the protester was attempting to elicit a reaction from her with taunts and finished the caption with "Come back and get ya some more old girl, I'll be on the line again tonight."

In May 2021, the state of Kentucky announced that they would not file charges against the Louisville Metro Police Department officers and the Kentucky National Guard soldiers.

== Reactions ==
Metro Council President David James described himself as a close personal friend of McAtee and described him as a good man who loved his neighborhood and city. McAtee's mother told reporters that he was known by the policemen and the community, and that he had fed all the policemen and would join them for discussions while they ate.

After the state of Kentucky announced that there will not be charges filed against the officers and soldiers involved in the shooting, people in Louisville protested. Several demonstrators were arrested including McAtee's brother, who was charged with unlawful assembly and obstructing the highway.

== See also ==
- Black Lives Matter
- Lists of killings by law enforcement officers in the United States
- Political violence
