= Kentucky Army National Guard =

Component of the US Army and military of the state of Kentucky

Headquarters, State Area Command Kentucky Army National Guard
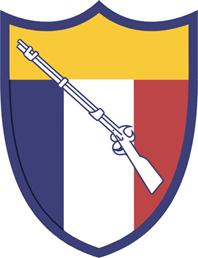
- Shoulder sleeve insignia of the Kentucky State Area Command (STARC)
- Founded: 1775
- Country: United States
- Allegiance: Kentucky
- Branch: Army National Guard
- Type: ARNG Headquarters Command
- Size: 6,406 men (2022)
- Part of: Kentucky National Guard

Insignia
- Kentucky Army National Guard Crest

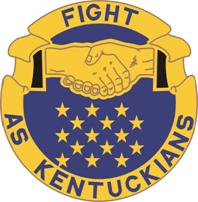
- Kentucky ARNG Headquarters DUI

- Kentucky ARNG Headquarters Flag

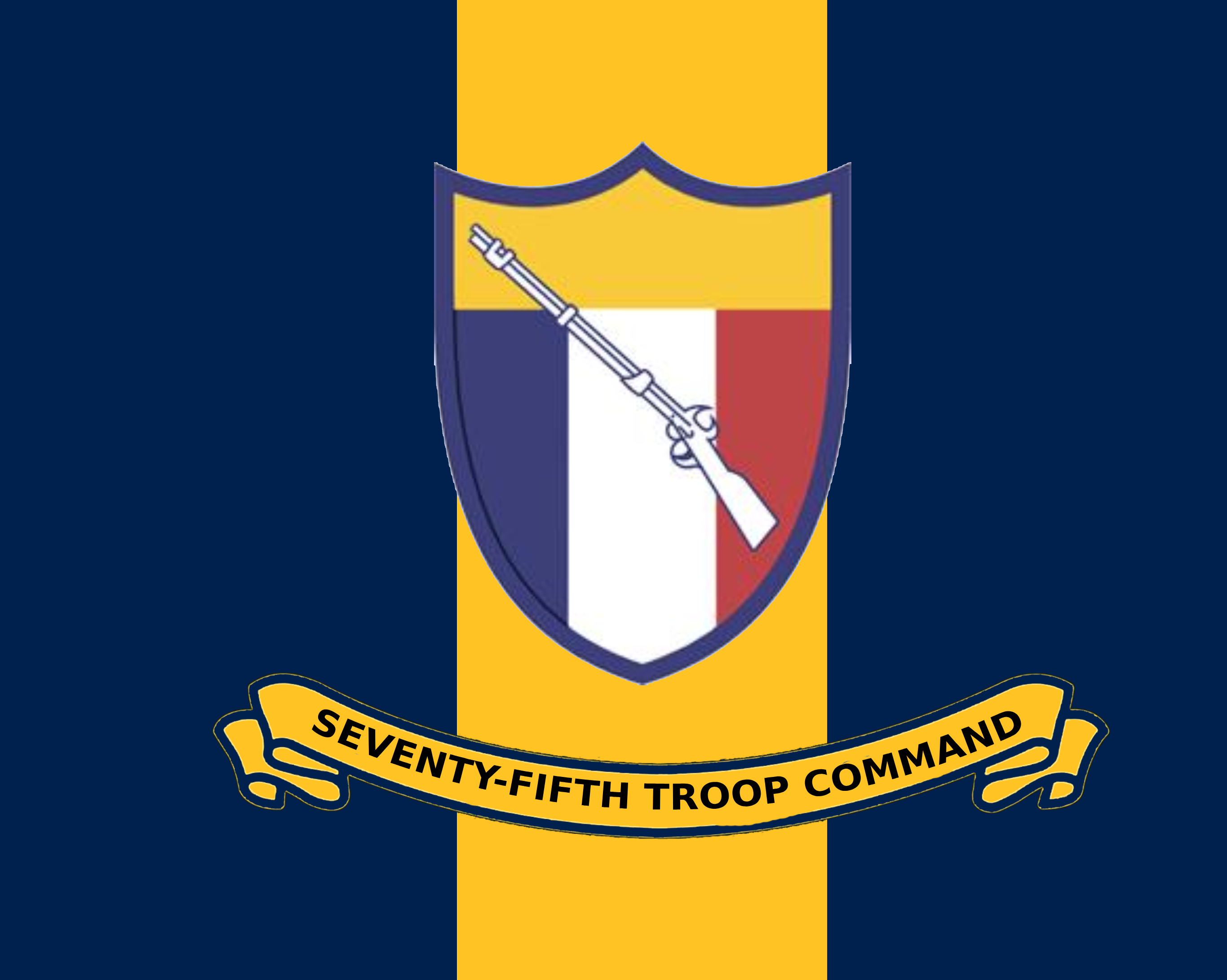
- Kentucky ARNG 75th Troop Command Flag

The Kentucky Army National Guard is a component of the United States Army and the United States National Guard. Nationwide, the Army National Guard has more than 430,000 members as of FY 2023. National coordination of various state National Guard units are maintained through the National Guard Bureau.

Kentucky Army National Guard units are trained and equipped as part of the United States Army. The same ranks and insignia are used and National Guardsmen are eligible to receive all United States military awards. The Kentucky Guard also bestows a number of state awards for local services rendered in or to the state of Kentucky.

The Kentucky Army National Guard is authorized approximately 7,250 personnel and has an approximate strength of 6,406 as of November 3, 2022. The Kentucky ARNG is composed of approximately 61 armories and is present in 53 communities, with its headquarters located in Frankfort, Kentucky.

== Structure ==
- Joint Force Headquarters Kentucky (Frankfort, KY)
- 63rd Theater Aviation Brigade (Frankfort)
  - 751st Troop Command BNGC (Frankfort)
- 75th Troop Command (Louisville)
  - 41st Civil Support Team (Louisville)
  - Kentucky Medical Detachment BNGC (Frankfort)
  - 1st Battalion, 149th Infantry Regiment (Barbourville)
  - 20th Military Intelligence Co., 20th Special Forces Group (Airborne) (Louisville)
- 138th Field Artillery Brigade (Lexington)
  - 2nd Battalion, 138th Artillery (Lexington)
  - 1st Battalion, 623rd Field Artillery HIMARS (Glasgow, KY)
  - 103rd Brigade Support Battalion (Harrodsburg)
- 149th Maneuver Enhancement Brigade (Bowling Green)
  - 103rd Chemical Battalion (Burlington)
  - 201st Engineer Battalion (Ashland)
  - 198th Military Police Battalion (Louisville)
  - 149th Brigade Support Battalion (Bowling Green)
  - 206th Engineer Battalion (Owensboro)
- 238th Regiment Training Institute (Greenville)
- 438th Military Police Company (Murray)
- 38t Infantry Division Artillery DIVARTY
- Recruiting and Retention Battalion

Installations

- Army Aviation Support Facility at Boone National Guard Center

== Duties ==
National Guard units can be federalized by presidential order to supplement regular armed forces, and upon declaration of a state of emergency by the governor of the state in which they serve. Unlike Army Reserve members, National Guard members cannot be mobilized individually (except through voluntary transfers and Temporary Duty Assignments TDY), but only as part of their respective units.

=== Active duty callups ===
For much of the final decades of the twentieth century, National Guard personnel typically served "one weekend a month, two weeks a year", with a portion working for the Guard in a full-time capacity. The current forces formation plans of the US Army call for the typical National Guard unit (or national guardsman) to serve one year of active duty for every three years of service. More specifically, current Department of Defense policy is that no guardsman will be involuntarily activated for a total of more than 24 months (cumulative) in one six-year enlistment period (this policy is due to change 1 August 2007, the new policy states that soldiers will be given 24 months between deployments of no more than 24 months, individual states have differing policies).

== History ==
The Kentucky State Guard became the Kentucky National Guard in 1912, when a new federal law regulating the militia came into effect. The new system set training standards for state units and established more efficient procedures for mobilizing the Guard into federal service.

The procedures were tested in 1916 when violence from the revolution going on in Mexico spilled across the border. Nearly all the Kentucky National Guard joined units from many other states on patrol along the Mexican border. For the first time, Kentucky troops used trucks and machine guns on active duty. Guardsmen returned from Texas in 1917 just in time to be mustered into federal service for duty in World War I. Kentucky units were attached to the 38th Infantry Division organized at Camp Shelby, Mississippi. The First Kentucky Infantry became the 138th Field Artillery, and the Second Kentucky became the 149th Infantry Regiment. After training, the 38th Division went to France to serve as replacements in other units. The division never fought as a single organization, but 7,518 National Guardsmen from Kentucky served in World War One and 890 Kentuckians died in the war.

In 1941 the National Guard of the United States was mobilized for active service. The 38th Tank Company was detached from the 38th Infantry Division to become Company D of the 192nd Tank Battalion. Arriving in the Philippines in late 1941, the company engaged in combat during the Japanese invasion and the US retreat to the Bataan Peninsula; being part of the force that surrendered to the Japanese. A cavalry regiment, the 123rd Cavalry was made part of the 22nd Cavalry Division and served in the Continental United States. The 38th Infantry Division fought in the Philippines Campaign from 1944 to 1945.

During the Korean War the 623rd Field Artillery Regiment was activated and served as part of X Corps.

The 2nd Battalion, 138th Field Artillery Regiment of the Kentucky Army National Guard was ordered to service in Vietnam in late 1968. The unit supported the regular 101st Airborne Division. The Battalion's C Battery lost nine men killed and 32 wounded when North Vietnamese troops overran Fire Base Tomahawk on June 19, 1969.

Soldiers of the Kentucky Army National Guard's 133rd Mobile Public Affairs Detachment deployed to Bosnia for NATO's Operation Joint Forge. The unit provided Public Affairs support to the commander of Task Force Eagle and Multi-National Division.

The 149th Armored Brigade traces its recent history to the activation of XXIII Corps Artillery on 1 October 1959. It was then converted and redesignated HHC 149th Armored Brigade on 1 November 1980. A military unit has been active in the Louisville area since the 149th Infantry Regiment Combat Team was activated after World War II, and the '149' number came from that regiment. The U.S. Army Center for Military History attributes lineage and honors to the Louisville unit further back than that. In 1984–85, the brigade included the 1st and 2nd Battalions of the 123rd Armor Regiment, and the 1st Battalion, 149th Infantry Regiment, and the 2nd Battalion, 138th Field Artillery. It served a period of being an infantry brigade, circa 2006, including a deployment to Iraq, where it assumed responsibility for COB Speicher, Tikrit, on 1 June 2006. The brigade now appears to be the 149th Maneuver Enhancement Brigade, whose activation took place in the Kentucky 2006-2007 fiscal year (July 2006-end of June 2007). Its badge was redesignated as the 149th MEB badge effective 1 September 2008.

=== 2009 January Storm ===
Kentucky governor Steve Beshear was quoted as saying that the January 2009 storm that blew through Kentucky was the "worst natural disaster" to ever hit the commonwealth. Nearly all of the 120 counties were affected in some way, and almost every Kentucky Guardsman was called up to assist citizens from the Bluegrass to the Mississippi River. More than 4,600 National Guard soldiers and airmen in Kentucky were called up for duty.

=== George Floyd riots ===
On June 1, 2020, business owner David McAtee was shot and killed by the Kentucky Army National Guard and by the Louisville Metro Police Department. The police department and the National Guard were in the area to enforce a 9 p.m. curfew implemented by Louisville Mayor Greg Fischer. They allege that police officers and soldiers, in their effort to enforce the curfew, had boxed the crowd into the area thus causing a panic, which resulted in people running towards the restaurant of David McAtee. According to an LMPD statement, David McAtee opened fire at police officers and at National Guard soldiers, who returned fire. A bullet shot by a National Guard soldier struck McAtee in the chest, killing him at the scene at about 12:15 a.m.

=== Protecting the U.S. Capitol ===
Kentucky ARNG military police officer in Washington, D.C. in February 2021

The Kentucky Army National Guard was mobilized to Washington, D.C. on January 6, 2021, during which two people died during the riots, including a U.S. Capitol policeman who died of a heart attack and an unarmed female rioter who was shot by a policeman.

== See also ==
- Kentucky Active Militia
