= 219th Battlefield Surveillance Brigade =

- 219th Battlefield Surveillance Brigade former shoulder sleeve insignia
- Active: 2007-2016
- Country: United States of America
- Branch: Army National Guard
- Type: Military Intelligence
- Part of: Indiana Army National Guard; 38th Infantry Division (attached)
- Garrison/HQ: Johnson County Armory, Franklin, Indiana
- Mottos: Stalk the Enemy – Anytime, Anywhere
- Engagements: Operation New Dawn
- Decorations: Meritorious Unit Commendation, Iraq 2011

Commanders
- Current commander: COL David Vesper
- Notable commanders: COL Ivan E. Denton (First Commander)

Insignia
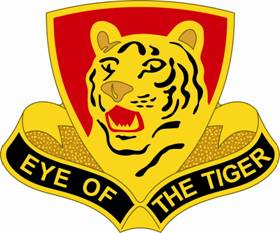
- Distinctive Unit Insignia

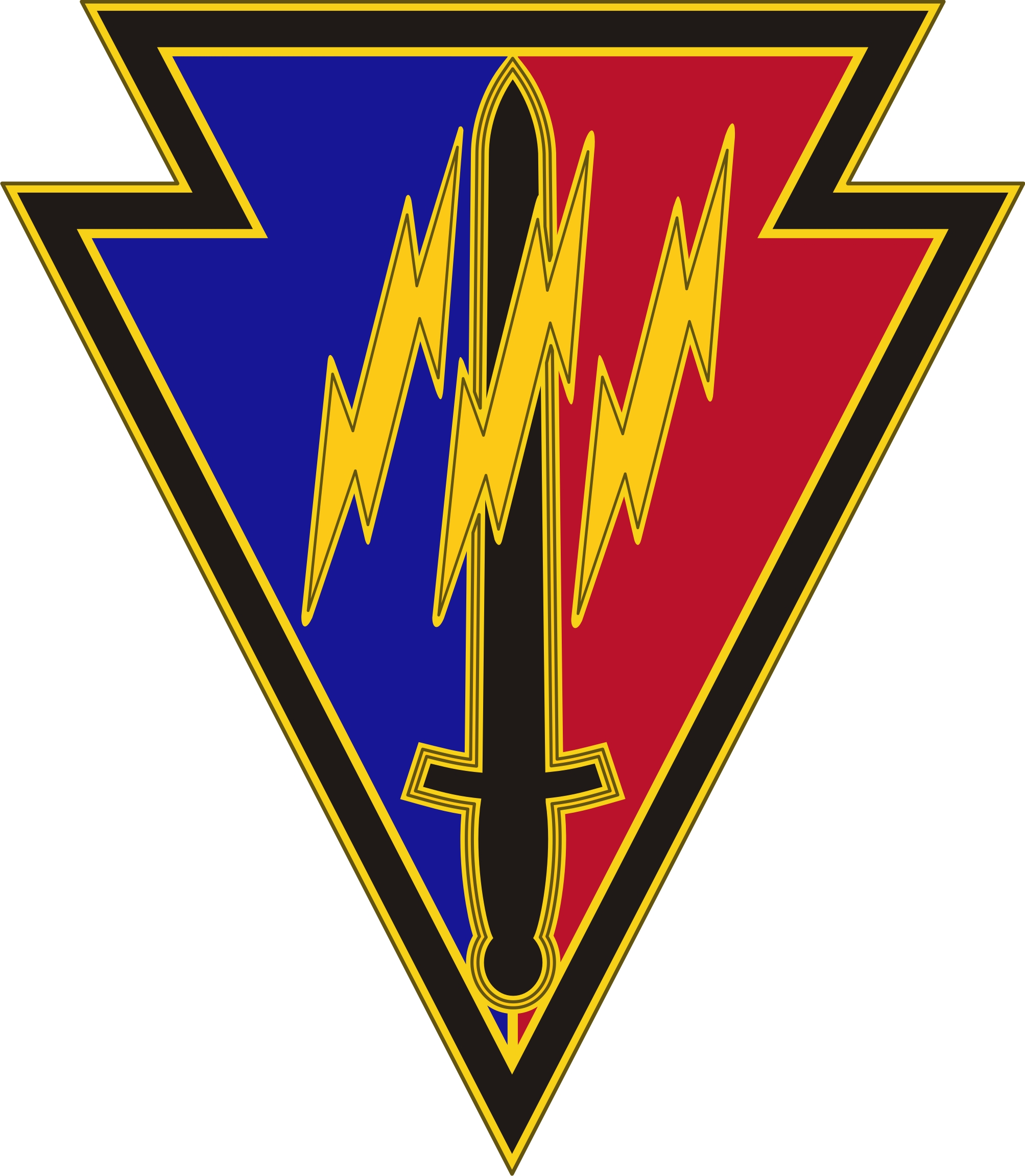
- Combat Service Identification Badge (CSIB is now for 219th Engineer Brigade due to inactivation)

The 219th Battlefield Surveillance Brigade was part of the United States Army Surveillance/reconnaissance formation introduced from c.2006-2011. The United States Army planned for the creation and transformation of nine intelligence brigades to a 'Battlefield Surveillance' role in 2007. The first Battlefield Surveillance Brigade (BfSB) was deployed the same year conducting Surveillance, Reconnaissance and Intelligence operations. However, gathering information is only half the challenge it faced. Along with the structural changes and intelligence capabilities, the sustainment capabilities of the brigade also changed.[2] The United States Army reorganized it’s intelligence formations into Battlefield Surveillance Brigades (BfSB). The brigades were self-sufficient Army Modular Forces. Army doctrine changed the name of the BfSB to Reconnaissance and Surveillance Brigade in 2011. In 2016, the 219th BfSB was redesignated to the 219th Engineer Brigade.

The 219th BfSB was composed of:

- Headquarters and Headquarters Company (HHC) (Franklin, Indiana)
  - Commander: COL David Vesper
  - Command Sergeant Major: CSM Christopher Knies
- 2nd Battalion, 151st Infantry Regiment – South Bend, IN (Transferring to the 76th IBCT, INARNG, effective 1 October 2013)
  - Company A – Hammond, IN (Light Infantry)
  - Company B – Logansport, IN (Light Infantry)
  - Company C – Hartford City, IN (Light Infantry)
  - Company D – Frankfort, IN (Heavy Weapons)

During deployment to Afghanistan in support of Operation Enduring Freedom in 2009-2010, soldiers assigned to Bco, 2nd Bn, 151st Inf received both the Meritorious Unit Citation and Valorous Unit Award, along with other combat awards and decorations while executing combat operations that included reconnaissance/surveillance operations, convoy security patrols, and quick reaction force (QRF) duties as part of Task Force Yukon (4th BCT (Airborne)) and Task Force Rakkasan (3d Bde, 101st Airborne Division) for the International Security Assistance Force (ISAF) in Khost province.

- 2nd Squadron, 152nd Cavalry Regiment (Reconnaissance & Surveillance) – Columbus, IN
  - Troop A – Bluffton, IN Light Cavalry
  - Troop B – Bluffton, IN Light Cavalry
  - Troop C – Seymour, IN Long Range Surveillance (Airborne) "Indiana Rangers"

Troop C, 2-152 CAV used to be known as Company D (Long Range Reconnaissance Patrol), 151st Infantry; Company D (Ranger), 151st Infantry; and 151st Infantry Detachment (Long Range Surveillance). This elite LRS unit was composed of paratroopers, snipers, pathfinders, signal communications specialists and rangers specializing in reconnaissance and surveillance deep behind enemy lines serving within the Indiana Army National Guard. The unit was designated as Troop C (LRS), 2nd Squadron, 152nd Cavalry Regiment of the 219th Battlefield Surveillance Brigade and in 2016, was redesignated as Company D, 2d Battalion, 151st Infantry Regiment, 76th Brigade Combat Team. As an LRS troop, this elite unit was affiliated with the US Army's 75th Ranger Regiment as per their full membership within the 75th Ranger Regiment Association. The Indiana Rangers originated as an elite 19th-century mounted militia force.

Personnel from the former Troop C (LRS), 2d Squadron, 152d Cavalry Regiment were used to form the new Company C, 2d Battalion (Airborne), 134th Infantry Regiment. While Company B is part of the Indiana Army National Guard, most of the battalion is under the Nebraska Army National Guard, and the battalion itself is assigned to the 45th Infantry Brigade Combat Team of the Oklahoma Army National Guard.

- Attached:
  - 1413th Engineer Company (Horizontal) – North Vernon, IN
  - Detachment, 165th Quartermaster Company (Airdrop & Supply) – Seymour, IN (Riggers)
  - 2219th Brigade Support Company (2219th BSC) – Bedford, IN
  - 438th Network Support Signal Company (438th NSSC) – Greenfield, IN
  - 378th Military Intelligence Battalion (378th MIB) (USAR)(IL)
  - 113th Engineer Battalion – Gary, IN

== Past commanders ==
- COL Ivan E. Denton (First Commander)
- COL Timothy N. Thombleson
- COL David N. Vesper
