= Shelbyville Municipal Airport =

Shelbyville Municipal Airport may refer to:

- Shelbyville Municipal Airport (Indiana) in Shelbyville, Indiana, United States (FAA: GEZ)
- Shelbyville Municipal Airport (Tennessee) in Shelbyville, Tennessee, United States (FAA/IATA: SYI)
