= 219th Engineer Brigade =

- 219th Engineer Brigade Shoulder Sleeve Insignia
- Active: 2016 – present
- Country: United States
- Allegiance: Indiana
- Branch: Army
- Type: Engineer
- Size: Brigade
- Part of: Army National Guard
- Garrison/HQ: Johnson County Armory, Franklin, Indiana
- Motto: Eye of the Tiger
- Engagements: Operation New Dawn
- Decorations: Meritorious Unit Commendation (Army)

Commanders
- Commanding Officer: COL John C. Roark
- Command Sergeant Major: CSM Benjamin M. Joy
- Notable commanders: COL Ivan E. Denton (First Commander)

Insignia
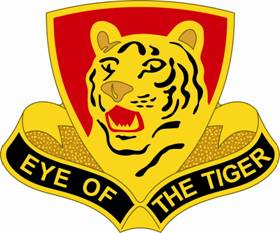
- Distinctive unit insignia

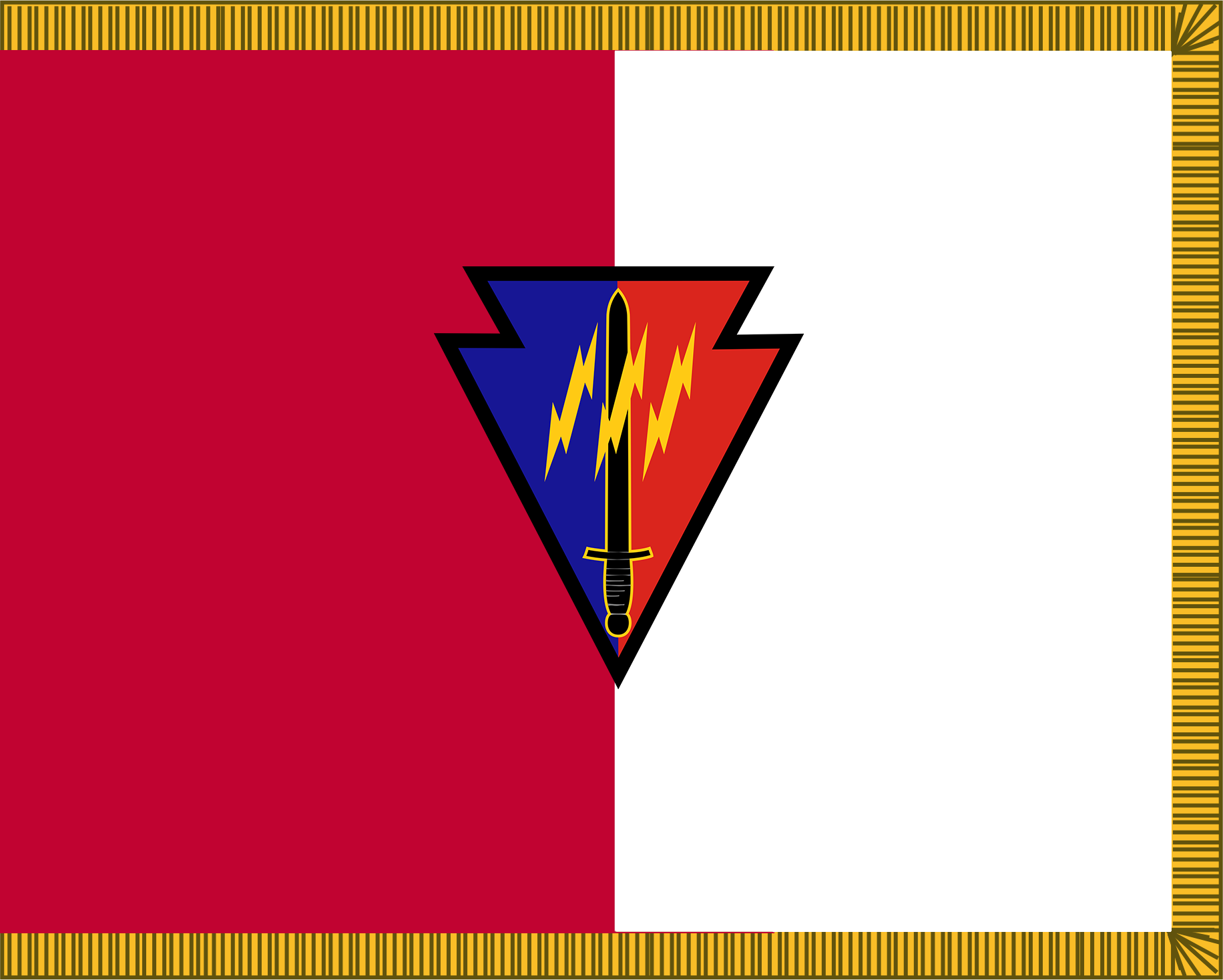
- 219th Engineer Brigade Flag

The 219th Engineer Brigade is a combat engineer brigade assigned to the 38th Infantry Division of the Indiana Army National Guard. Soldiers of the 219th Engineer Brigade provide various supportive duties to other Army units, including construction, engineering, and mechanical work on other Army projects.

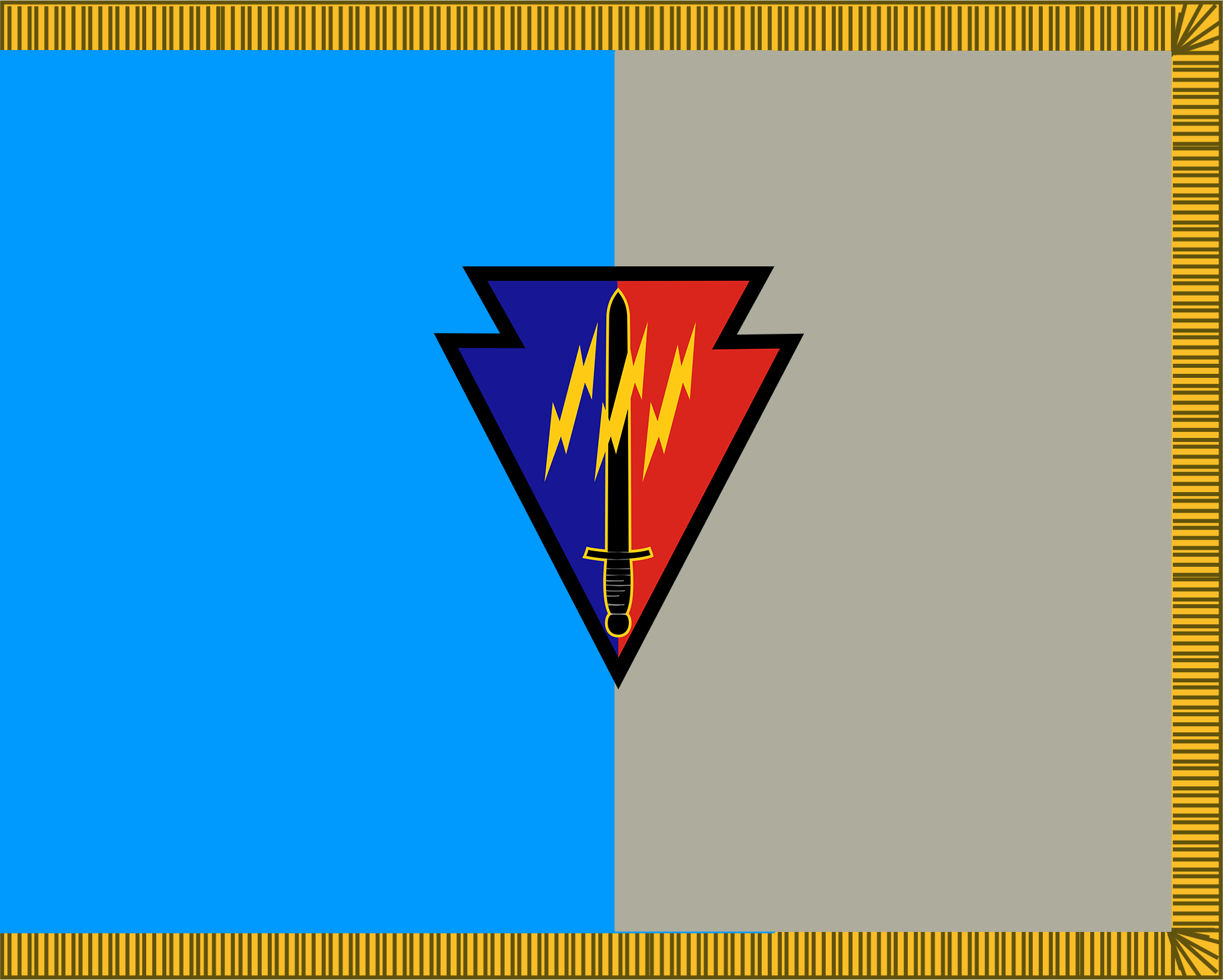
219th Battlefield Surveillance Brigade Flag

The 219th was originally activated in 2007 as the 219th Battlefield Surveillance Brigade, one of ten other self-sufficient battlefield surveillance brigades that were activated during efforts to reform and modernize the US Army. Its original mission was to improve situational awareness for commanders at division-level or higher. However, in 2015, battlefield surveillance brigades were declared obsolete. Five out of the ten brigades were reorganized into expeditionary military intelligence brigades. Two were disbanded. The other three were converted into different types of units. In 2016, the 219th Engineer Brigade was activated. It is headquartered at Franklin, Indiana.

Since its activation, the unit has taken part in overseas tours to Kuwait, Qatar, Jordan, Iraq, Afghanistan, and has independently conducted various humanitarian missions in the United States and in other nations throughout the world.

== Organization ==
The 219th Engineer Brigade currently consists of one engineer battalion, one field artillery battalion, and one signal company, with units spread out throughout Indiana. The Brigade Headquarters and Headquarters Company (HHC) is headquartered at Johnson County Armory, Franklin, Indiana. The 113th Engineer Battalion is headquartered at Gary, Indiana. 2-150th Field Artillery Battalion is headquartered at Bloomington, Indiana. The 738th Signal Company is located at Lafayette, Indiana.

== Past commanders ==
- COL David N. Vesper
- COL Timothy N. Thombleson
- COL R. Dale Lyles
- COL Steven Hines
- COL Sean Begley
