= Fort Benjamin Harrison =

Former US Army post in Indianapolis, IN, US 1906-1991

- Fort Benjamin Harrison Historic District
- U.S. National Register of Historic Places
- U.S. Historic district
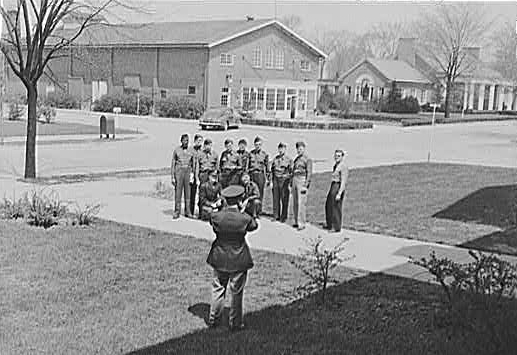
- Graduates of the U.S. Army Chaplain School at Fort Benjamin Harrison pose for a photograph, April 1942

- Location within Indianapolis Location within Indiana Location within the United States
- Location: E. 56th St.; also roughly bounded by Shafter Rd., Aultman Ave., and Glenn Rd., Lawrence Township, Marion County, Indiana
- Coordinates: 39°51′50″N 86°0′38″W
- Area: 360 acres (150 ha)
- Built: 1908
- Built by: Army Quartermaster Corps
- Architectural style: Colonial Revival
- NRHP reference No.: 93001581, 95001359 (Boundary Increase)
- Added to NRHP: September 6, 1995, December 1, 1995 (Boundary Increase)

Fort Benjamin Harrison was a U.S. Army post located in suburban Lawrence Township, Marion County, Indiana, northeast of Indianapolis, between 1906 and 1991. It is named for the 23rd President of the United States, Benjamin Harrison.

== History ==
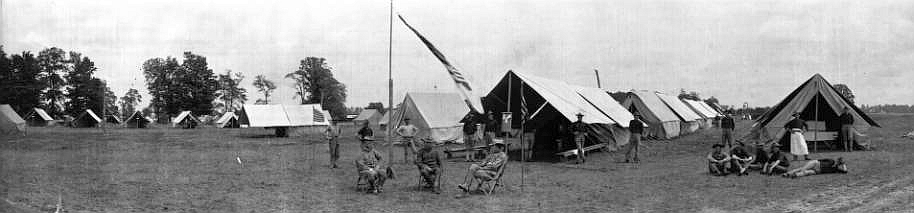
Fort Benjamin Harrison, c. 1910

In 1901, Russell Harrison, the son of former U.S. president Benjamin Harrison, facilitated the sale of a U.S. Arsenal near downtown Indianapolis. The U.S. Army used the proceeds to buy land in 1903 in a more remote area, where the fort is located today. Secretary of War Elihu Root named the post for President Benjamin Harrison in honor of Harrison's hometown.

Fort Benjamin Harrison saw its highest levels of activity during World War I and World War II. The Fort Benjamin Harrison Reception Center (for inducting draftees) opened in 1941 and by 1943 was the largest reception center in the United States.

Within Fort Harrison was Camp Glenn, named in honor of Major General Edwin Forbes Glenn, who had served as Fort Harrison's commandant from 1912 to 1913, and who had commanded the officer training that began at his camps in 1916. Camp Glenn was a Citizens Military Training Camp (CMTC) that was also used to house Civilian Conservation Corps (CCC) workers. When the United States reestablished the Military Police Corps in 1941, an MP school was established at Camp Glenn and was in operation by early 1942. The area was also used to detain Italian and German prisoners of war in 1944 and 1945.

In 1947, the Army declared Fort Harrison to be surplus property, but declined to completely close it due to a lack of adequate training space for the Indiana National Guard. From 1948 to 1950, the post functioned as Benjamin Harrison Air Force Base. The Tenth Air Force was moved from Omaha, Nebraska, and headquartered at both Schoen Field on Fort Harrison and Stout Army Air Field in Indianapolis. Overcrowding and inadequate facilities soon forced the 10th Air Force to move to Selfridge Air National Guard Base in Michigan, and the Army reacquired control of Fort Benjamin Harrison.

It became the home of the United States Army Adjutant General School in March 1951. In 1957, the school moved into the new Gates-Lord Hall along with the United States Army Finance School. At the time, this 300,000-square-foot (28,000 m^{2}) building was the third largest owned by the Department of Defense. The Adjutant General School remained there until the Base Realignment resulted in its move to Fort Jackson, South Carolina, starting in 1991. By 1995, the Adjutant General School had completely vacated Fort Benjamin Harrison. The Finance School also moved to Fort Jackson in 1995.

The Interservice Postal School was located at Fort Benjamin Harrison in the 1970s under the US Army Institute of Administration (USAIA), and was staffed by instructors from all four services. It also moved to Fort Jackson in 1995.

Beginning in 1965, Fort Harrison was also the home of the Defense Information School (DINFOS). This was staffed by enlisted personnel and officers from all branches of the US military along with members of allied military personnel. DINFOS trained service members and Department of Defense employees to become journalists in print, radio, television, and photography, as well as training them in advanced supervisory roles in editing, public affairs, and media and community relations. In 1995, DINFOS moved to Fort Meade, Maryland.

With the movement and creation of a number of training classes in financial, clerical, and information technology (most notably the Programmer/Analyst Course and the Computer Machine Operator Course) the fort was given the derisive moniker "Uncle Ben's Rest Home" implying that no real military training took place there.

The Fort was the site of the Athletes' Villages for the 1987 Pan American Games. Construction documents were created for new buildings to house the athletes, but the buildings were not built.

=== Remaining military presence ===
Fort Benjamin Harrison was closed as part of the 1991 Base Realignment and Closure Commission. The site of the base has since been redeveloped, and includes residential neighborhoods, a golf course, and is the site of Fort Harrison State Park.

Although the base has officially been inactivated, there is still a very significant military presence in the area. The Defense Finance and Accounting Service—Indianapolis, several United States Army Reserve, two United States Marine Corps Reserve detachments, United States Navy Reserve, Indiana National Guard units, the United States Military Entrance Processing Station (MEPS), an AAFES post exchange and commissary are still located at the former post.

Since 1999, the American Legion has had its John H. Geiger Operations Center located at Fort Harrison. The center houses the Membership Services staff who maintain the organization's membership database and provide direct-marketing services for membership renewal and new-member acquisition. It also houses the Emblem Sales Division which provides Legion merchandise, and the Fundraising Division which draws support for both national and department-level programs.

On May 29, 2009, the Indiana National Guard held a ground-breaking ceremony for a new facility, the Lawrence Readiness Training Center, which opened in 2011. The facility houses four units, including the 76th Brigade Combat Team headquarters.

The Veterans of Foreign Wars maintains its headquarters for the Department of Indiana on the site at 9555 E. 59th Street.

== Historic district ==
Fort Benjamin Harrison Historic District was added to the National Register of Historic Places in 1995. The district encompasses 100 contributing buildings, one contributing site (Parade Grounds), and three contributing structures (Water Tower, Kent Avenue Bridge, and Bandstand). It includes one and two-story Colonial Revival style brick buildings that were part of the original fort complex. They include residential and administrative buildings, service / utility buildings, and the hospital unit.

== Gallery ==
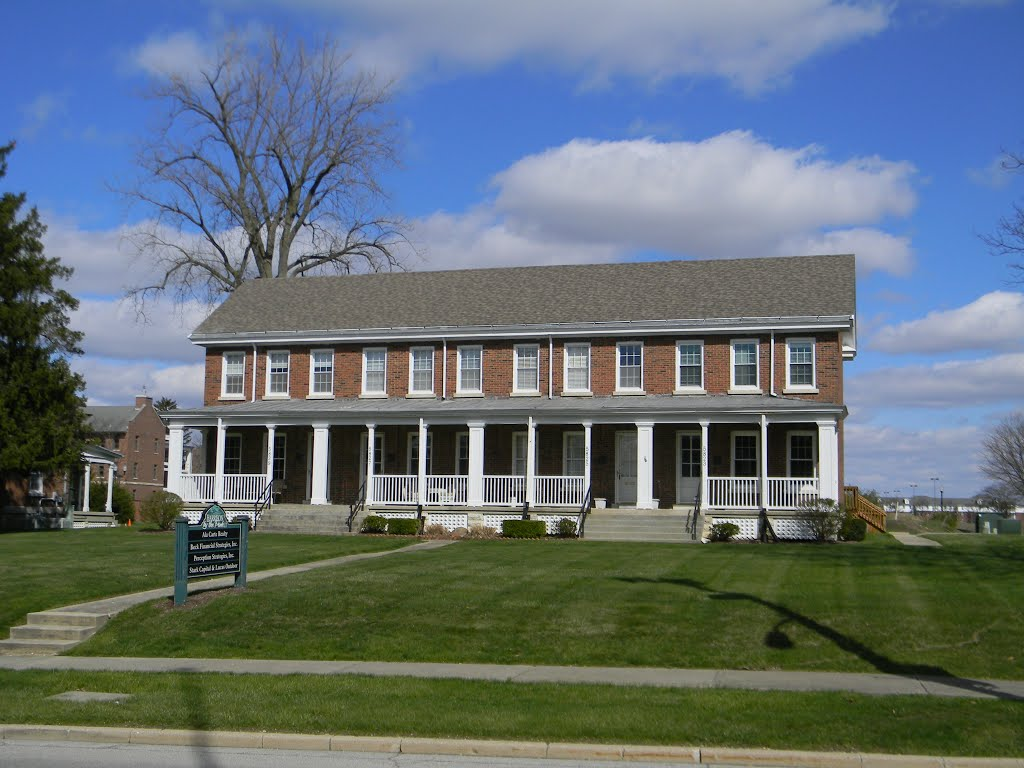
Building 405 - 2016

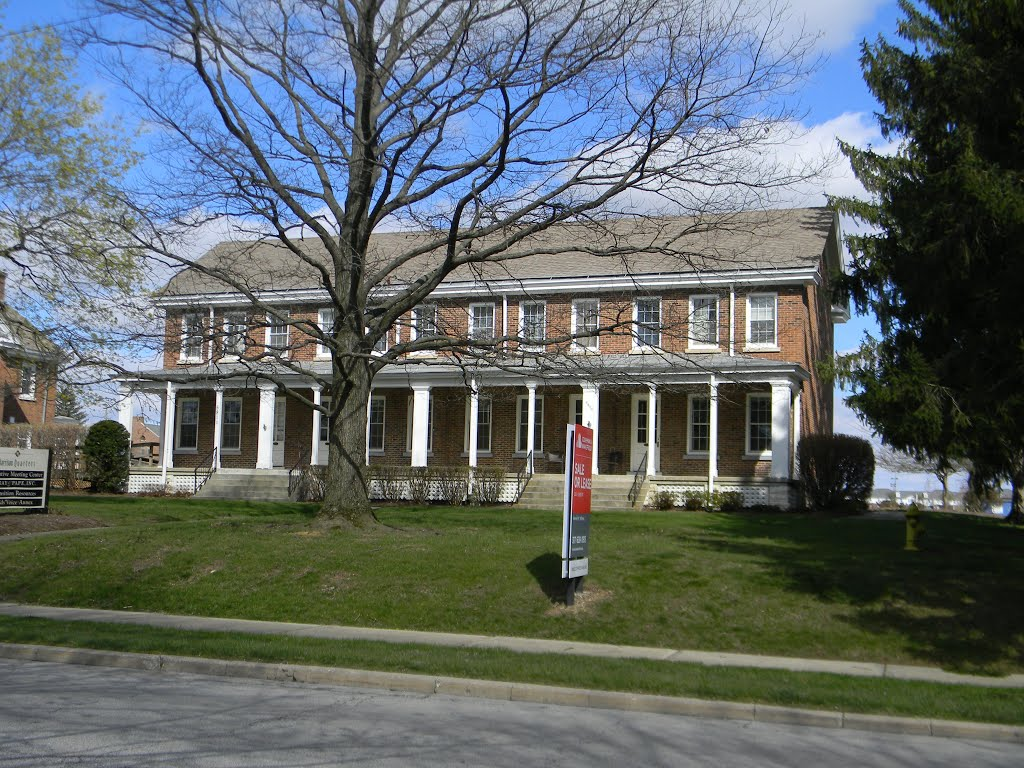
Building 406 - 2016

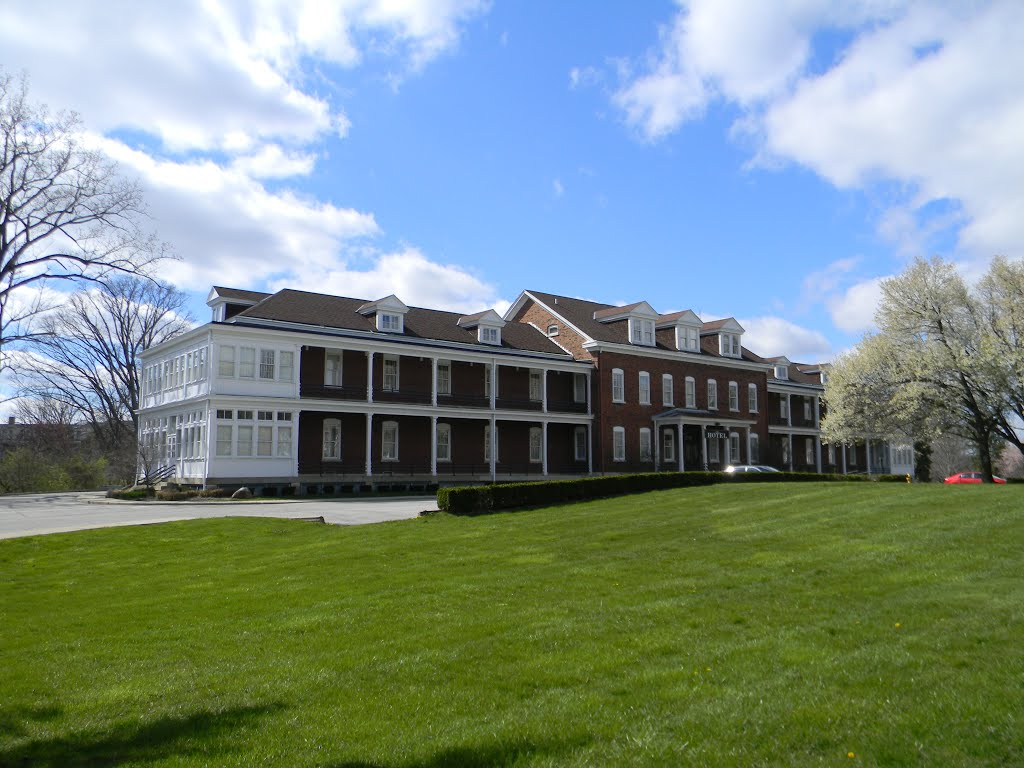
Fort Harrison Hospital and the Soldier Support Center - 2016
