= 638th Aviation Support Battalion =

- Country: United States of America
- Branch: National Guard
- Type: Battalion
- Role: Aviation support
- Size: Approx 670 Soldiers
- Part of: Indiana Army National Guard (IN ARNG)
- Decorations: Meritorious Unit Commendation

The 638th Aviation Support Battalion (638th ASB) is a US Army National Guard battalion. The unit earned the Meritorious Unit Commendation for the period 1 May 2019 to 8 January 2020.
