= 122nd Fighter Wing =

Unit of the Indiana Air National Guard

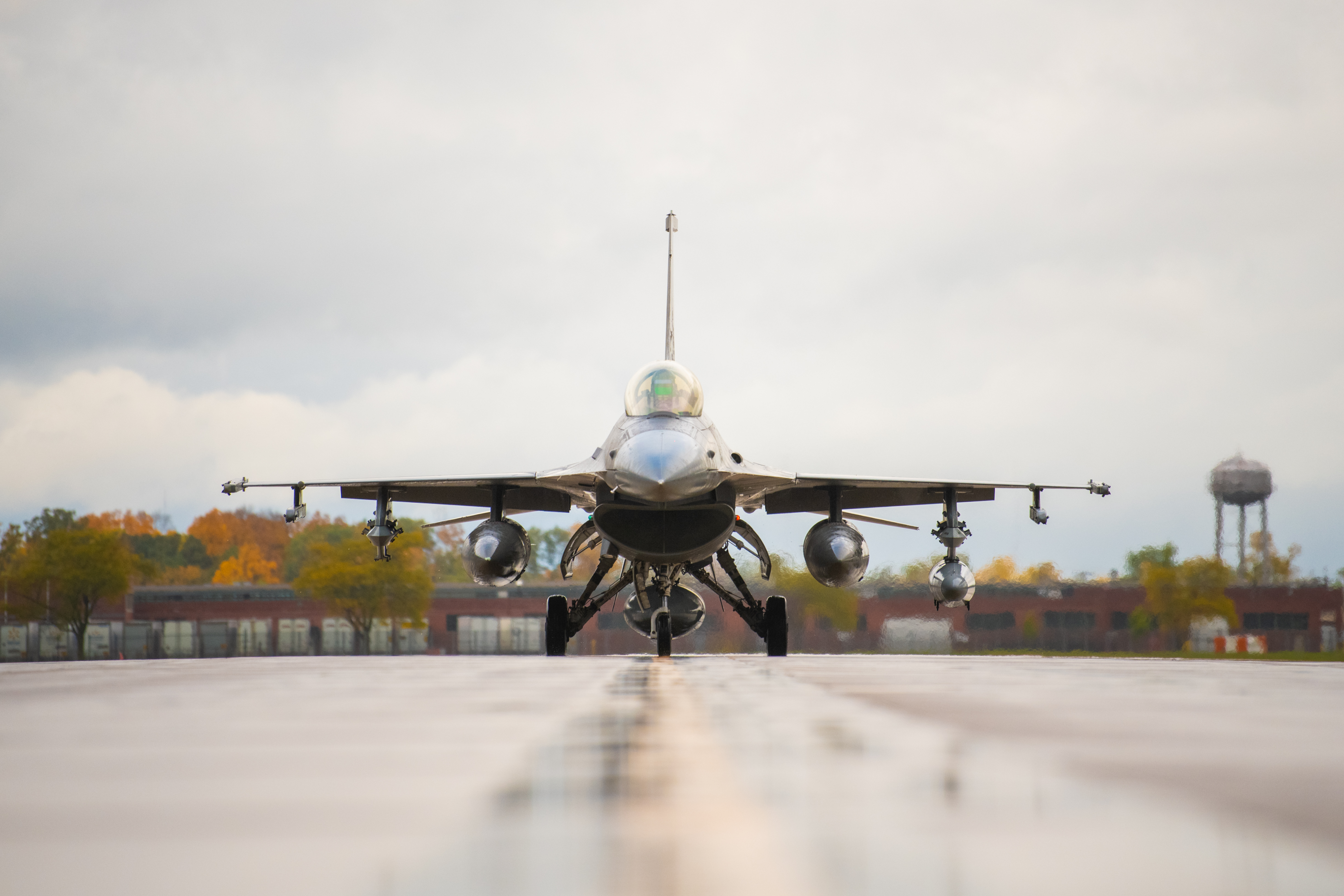
- A F-16 Fighting Falcon aircraft assigned to the 122nd Fighter Wing taxis at the Fort Wayne Indiana Air National Guard Base in Fort Wayne, Indiana, Oct. 20, 2023. The aircraft was the first to arrive at the base since conversion began in April.
- Active: 1942–present
- Country: United States
- Allegiance: Indiana
- Branch: Air National Guard
- Type: Wing
- Role: Close Air Support
- Part of: Indiana Air National Guard
- Garrison/HQ: Fort Wayne Air National Guard Station, Indiana
- Tail code: "IN" Indiana

Commanders
- Current commander: Col. Scott T. Boatright

Insignia
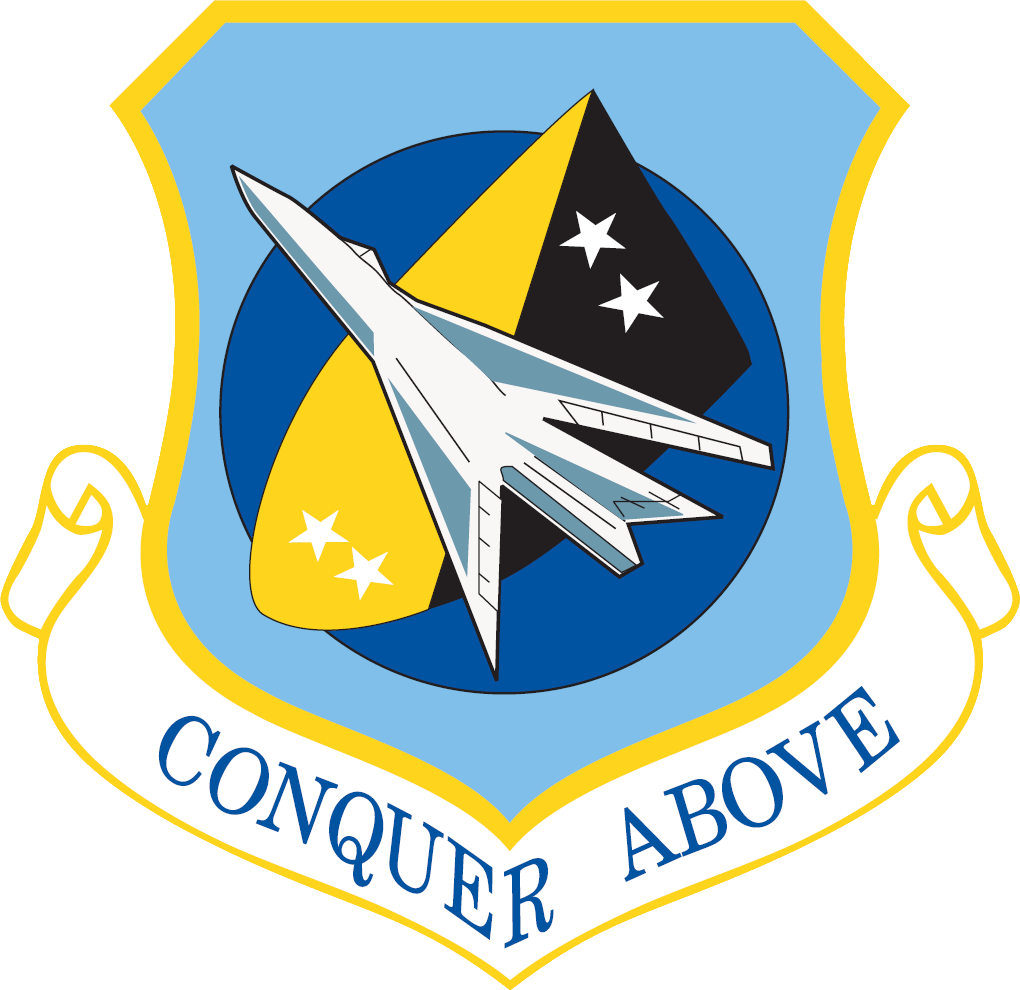
- 122nd Fighter Wing emblem (Note: Approved 28 July 1954. Description: azure (light blue) a bordure or (Air Force yellow), overall and saltirewise an escutcheon in prospect, (per bend or and sable, in chief four mullets of the last [color]) and a jet type aircraft with exhaust fire all proper.)

Aircraft flown
- Fighter: F-16 Fighting Falcon

The 122nd Fighter Wing(officially 122d) is a unit of the Indiana Air National Guard, stationed at Fort Wayne Air National Guard Station, Fort Wayne, Indiana. If activated to federal service, the wing is gained by the United States Air Force Air Combat Command.

== Units ==
- 122nd Operations Group (Tail code formerly "FW," now "IN.")

163rd Fighter Squadron

- 122nd Maintenance Group
- 122nd Mission Support Group
- 122nd Medical Group

== History ==
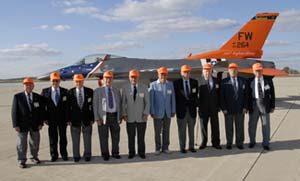
Ten original members of the 358th Fighter Group pose in front of the U.S. Air Force 122nd Fighter Wing's heritage jet at their final reunion, which was hosted by the 122nd Fighter Wing in Terre Haute AGB, Indiana in October 2008. The 358th FG, the "Orange Tails", was activated in January 1943. During the Second World War this unit was awarded three Distinguished Unit Citations and the Croix de Guerre.

In 2005, the wing introduced the reconnaissance Theater Airborne Reconnaissance System, becoming one of the first units to fly with it.

In 2008, after having flown for 17 years with the block 25 aircraft, these F-16s were nearing the end of their planned operational lifespans. The aircraft the 122nd received were only somewhat newer; Block 30 F-16C/Ds, manufactured between 1987 and 1989. These models were provided by the Michigan Air National Guard 107th Fighter Squadron, which was then transitioning to the A-10 Thunderbolt II at the time. With the upgrade to the Block 30 aircraft, the tail code of the 163rd was changed from "FW" (Fort Wayne) to "IN" (Indiana) in 2009 when the 181st Fighter Wing at Hulman Field became a non-flying unit. However, only a few of the F-16s were re-coded.

In 2009 – the year the unit honored its predecessor unit – the 358th FG – with a heritage jet – it was decided that the squadron was to retire their 20-year-old F-16s and become an A-10 Thunderbolt II squadron. The conversion happened in 2010.

In 2023, the unit converted back to the F-16 platform as a result of the National Defense Authorization Act. These started arriving in October 2023 and will continue until all 21 have arrived.

=== Lineage ===
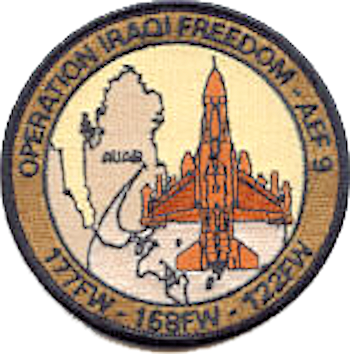
2006 Operation Iraqi Freedom patch

- Established as the 122nd Fighter Wing c. 30 October 1950

Activated c. 1 November 1950
Redesignated 122nd Fighter-Interceptor Wing and called to active duty on 10 February 1951
Inactivated on 7 February 1952
Released from active duty, redesignated 122nd Fighter-Bomber Wing and activated in the National Guard on 1 November 1952
Redesignated: 122nd Fighter-Interceptor Wing on 1 July 1955
Redesignated: 122nd Tactical Fighter Wing on 1 November 1958
Redesignated 122nd Tactical Fighter Wing (Special Delivery) on 1 July 1959
Federalized and ordered to active service on 1 October 1961
Released from active duty and returned to Indiana state control on 31 August 1962
Redesignated 122nd Fighter Wing on 16 March 1992

=== Assignments ===
- Indiana Air National Guard, 31 October 1950

Gained by: Tenth Air Force, Continental Air Command

- Eastern Air Defense Force, Air Defense Command, 10 February 1951
- Central Air Defense Force, Air Defense Command, 1 December 1951 – 7 February 1952
- Indiana Air National Guard, 1 November 1952

Gained by: Eastern Air Defense Force, Air Defense Command
Gained by: Tactical Air Command, 1 July 1954

- Ninth Air Force, 1 October 1961

Attached to Seventeenth Air Force, 1 October 1961 – 31 August 1962

- Indiana Air National Guard, 1 September 1962

Gained by: Tactical Air Command
Gained by: Air Combat Command, 1 June 1992 – present

=== Components ===
- 122nd Fighter-Interceptor Group (later 122nd Fighter-Bomber Group, 122nd Tactical Fighter Group, 122nd Operations Group, 10 February 1951 – 30 June 1974, c. 1 January 1993 – present
- 163rd Fighter (later Fighter-Interceptor, Tactical Fighter, Fighter) Squadron, 9 December 1974 – c. 1 January 1993

=== Stations ===
- Stout Field, Indianapolis, Indiana, 9 December 1946
- Baer Field, Fort Wayne, Indiana, 1 May 1951

Designated: Fort Wayne Air National Guard Station, 1991 – present

=== Aircraft ===
- F-51D Mustang, 1950–1951
- F-51H Mustang, 1951–1954
- F-80C Shooting Star, 1954–1956
- F-86A Sabre, 1956–1958
- F-84F Thunderstreak, 1958–1962; 1964–1971
- RF-84F Thunderstreak, 1962–1964
- F-100D/F Super Sabre, 1971–1979
- F-4C Phantom II, 1979–1986
- F-4E Phantom II, 1986–1991
- F-16C/D Fighting Falcon, 1991–2010
- A-10 Thunderbolt II, 2010 – 2023
- F-16C/D Fighting Falcon, 2023 – present
