= Stout Army Airfield =

Stout Army Airfield Mars Hill Airport
- IATA: none; ICAO: none

Summary
- Airport type: Military: Army Airfield
- Operator: United States Army
- Location: Indianapolis, Indiana
- Built: 1927
- In use: 1927-1960
- Occupants: Army
- Elevation AMSL: 256 ft / 78 m
- Coordinates: 39°44′15.93″N 86°13′47.95″W
- Interactive map of Stout Army Airfield

Runways
Direction	Length		Surface
Direction	ft	m	Surface
14/32	4,642	1,415	Asphalt
2/20	2,971	905	Asphalt
9/27	2,691	819	Asphalt
13/31	150	46	Asphalt
0/18	150	46	Asphalt
- Closed

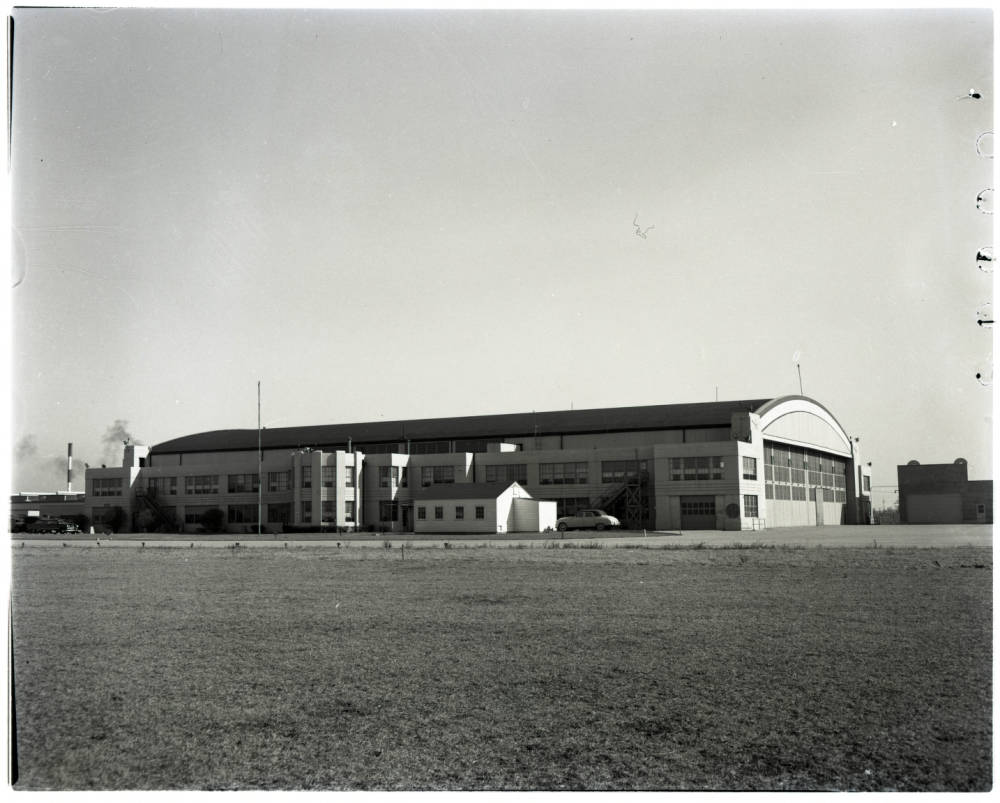
Stout Field hangar

Stout Army Airfield is located in Indianapolis, Indiana, United States. It serves as the Joint Forces Headquarters of the Indiana National Guard.

== History ==
Stout Field is located west of Holt Road, north and south of Minnesota Street in west Indianapolis. Established in 1926, the airport was a stop along a transcontinental air route from New York City to Los Angeles. The airport was officially named for Lt. Richard Harding Stout, a decorated veteran of World War I who had died in an airplane crash at Fort Benjamin Harrison.

Curtiss Flying Service operated an air passenger service and flying school at Stout Field. Curtiss' manager was Captain Harvey Weir Cook. By 1928, the city realized expansion possibilities were limited and began plans for what is now Indianapolis International Airport two miles (3.2 km) to the west. Captain Cook was among those who pushed for a larger municipal airport, which opened in 1931 as Indianapolis Municipal Airport. Curtiss and Transcontinental Air Transport moved their passenger service and school to the new airport.

The United States Army Air Corps leased Stout Field from Indiana for $1 per year during World War II to use as a training base, and to conduct air transport operations. Elements of the Central (later Eastern) Technical Training Command were located there.

The Indiana State Police used the airfield following the war and purchased more land in order to build extensions to the runways. The site proved inadequate for landing the new class of military jets and much of the land was sold in 1953.

The site of the airport has now been mostly filled out by commercial and industrial development, though the unmistakable outline of an airfield can still be seen from satellite pictures.

== Units hosted ==
- 122nd Fighter Wing

== Aircraft Hosted ==
- C-47 Skytrain
- C-53 Skytrooper
- C-46 Commando
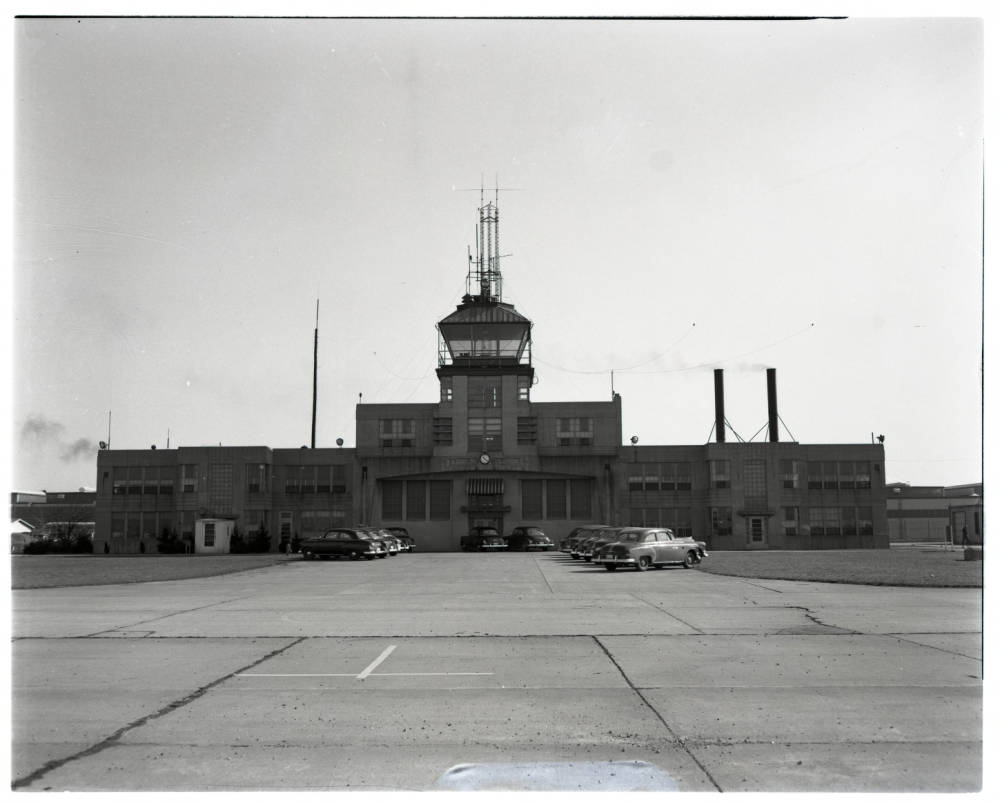
- Stout Field Control Tower
  de Havilland Canada DHC-3 Otter
- Bay Super V Bonanza
- F-80 Shooting Star
- F-101 Voodoo

== See also ==
- Indiana World War II Army Airfields
