= Indiana National Guard =

Component of the US Military of the State of Indiana

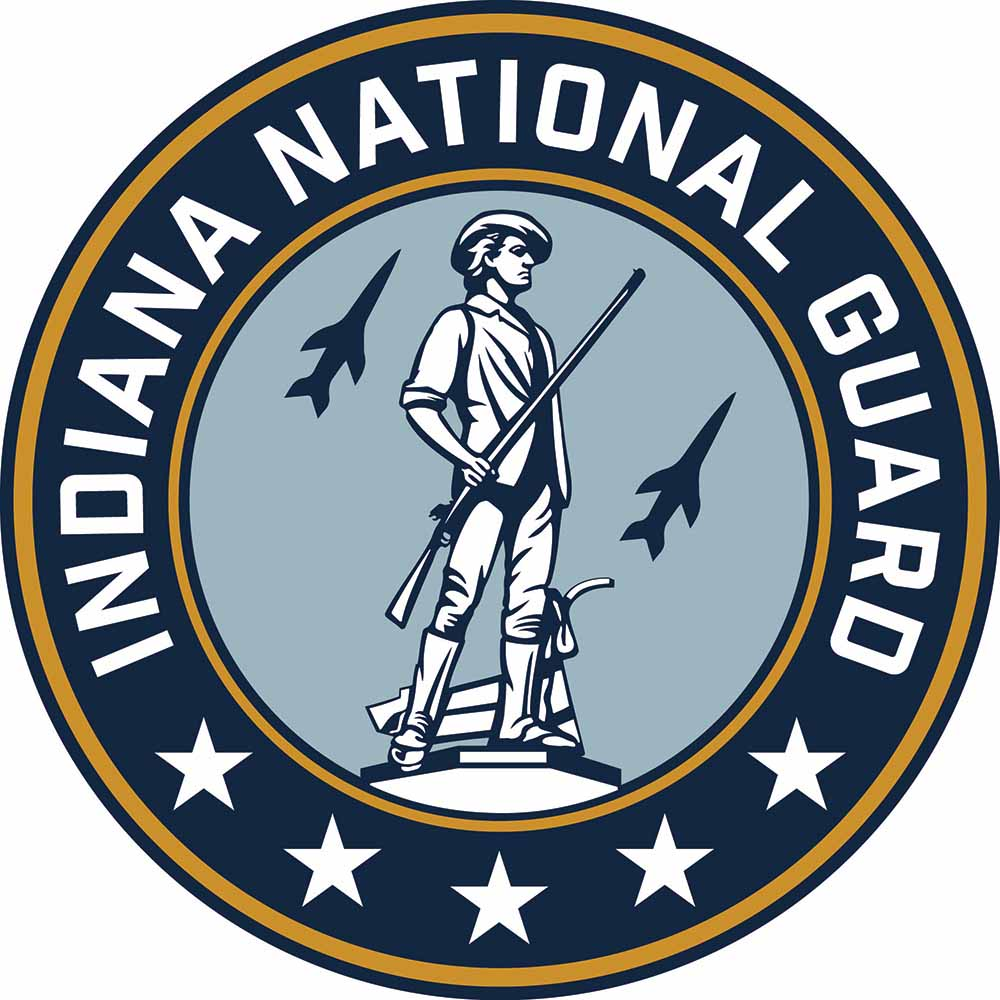
- Country: United States of America
- Type: Armed Forces
- Part of: Government of Indiana
- Joint Force Headquarters (JFHQ): Stout Army Air Field; Indianapolis, Indiana, U.S.
- Mottos: Always Ready, Always There
- Website: www.in.gov/indiana-national-guard/

Commanders
- Governor of Indiana: Governor Mike Braun
- The Adjutant General of Indiana: Brigadier General Lawrence "Larry" Muennich
- State Command Sergeant Major: CSM Joshua Brown

Insignia
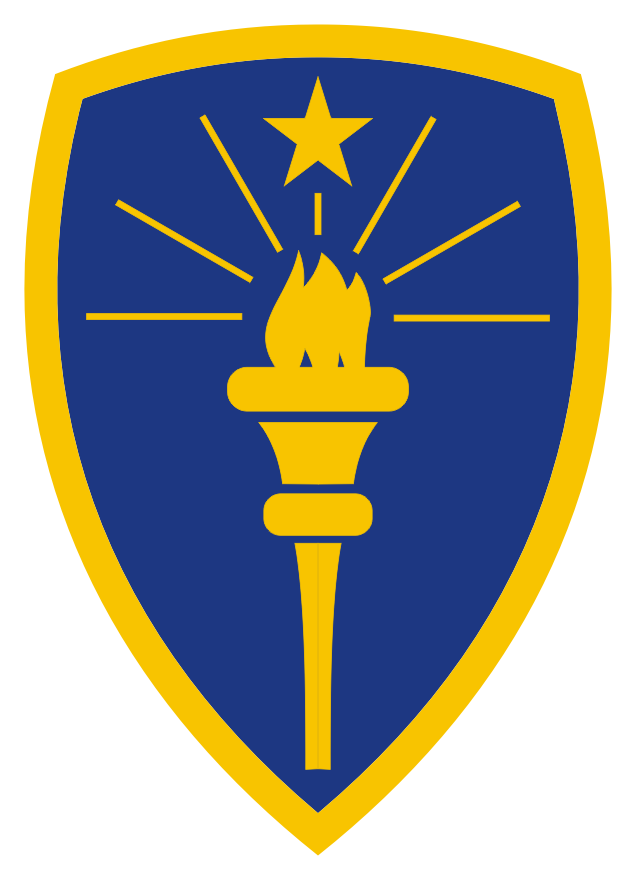
- Indiana Army National Guard Headquarters SSI

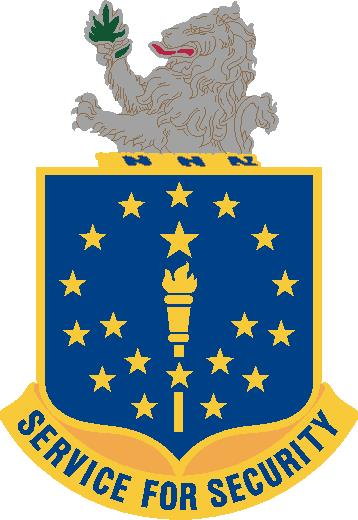
- Indiana Army National Guard STARC DUI

- Indiana Army National Guard Crest

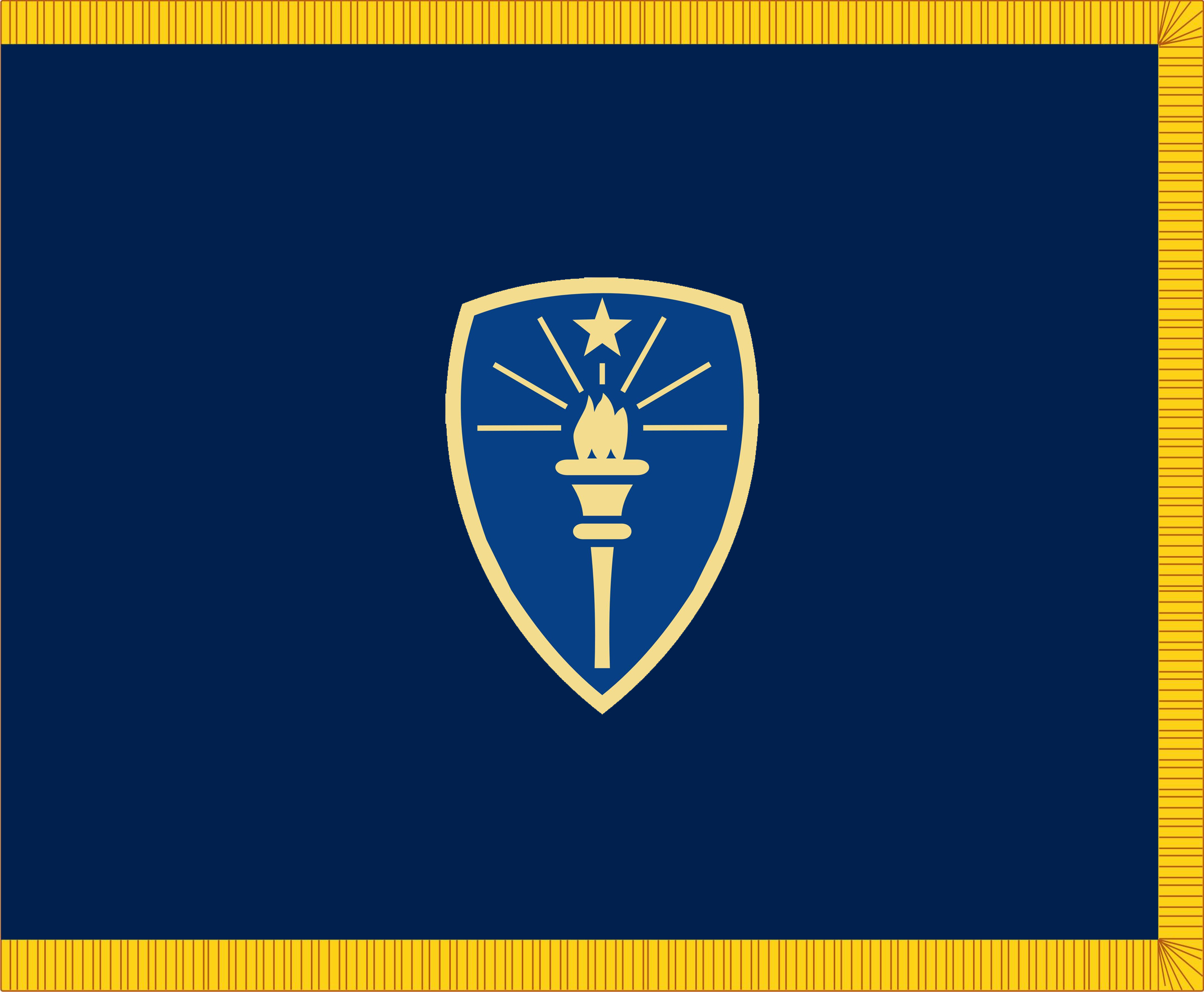
- Indiana Army National Guard Headquarters Flag

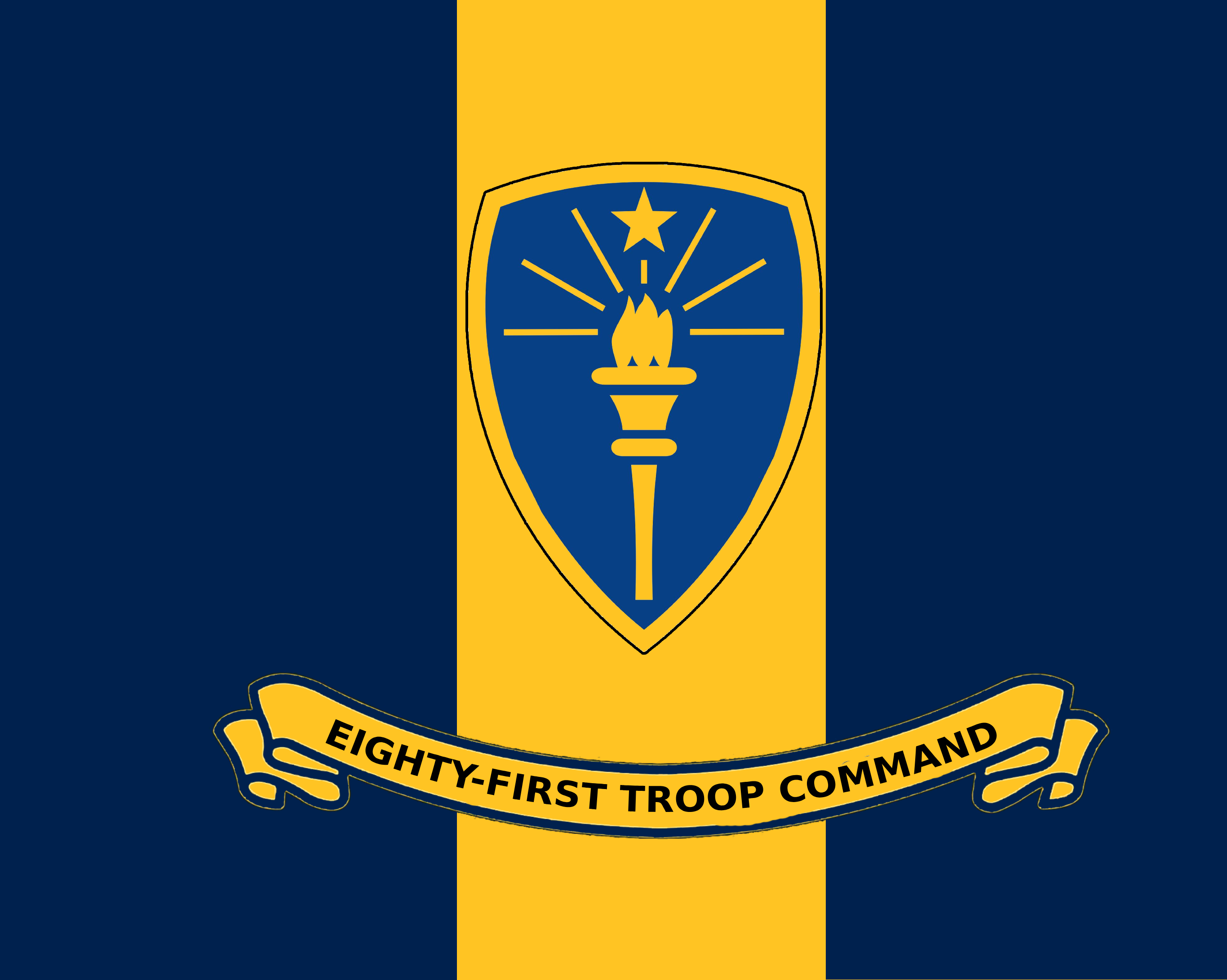
- Indiana Army National Guard 81st Troop Command Flag

The Indiana National Guard (INNG) is a component of the United States Department of Defense, and the Military Department of Indiana (MDI). It consists of the Indiana Army National Guard, the Indiana Air National Guard, and the Adjutant General's Office.

Indiana National Guard units are trained and equipped as part of the United States Army and Air Force. The same ranks and insignia are used, and National Guardsmen are eligible to receive all United States military awards. The INNG also awards a number of state awards for local services rendered in or to the state of Indiana.

The Indiana National Guard consists of 14,000 soldiers and airmen, and maintains Army National Guard armories across the state, training facilities at Camp Atterbury-Muscatatuck, and Air National Guard wings at Fort Wayne and Terre Haute. During peacetime, the National Guard is commanded by the governor. In its state role, the National Guard assists local law enforcement agencies during emergencies at the direction of the governor. The distribution of soldiers, equipment and facilities across the state allows the National Guard to respond quickly and efficiently to emergencies statewide.

During times of national emergency, National Guard members may be called into active federal service by the president of the United States. The National Guard's dual federal-state mission is unique to the U.S. military and sets the National Guard apart from any other reserve component.

The Indiana National Guard is supported by Indiana's State Defense Force, a military entity solely funded and administered by Indiana resources. Indiana's SDF is named the Indiana Guard Reserve It is authorized by both the State Code of Indiana and Executive Order. The IGR assumes the state mission of the Indiana National Guard in the event the Guard is federally mobilized.

== History ==
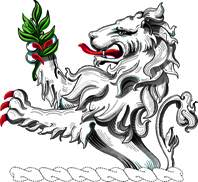
Crest of the Harrison family, used for Indiana Army National Guard Regiments, depicting a wreath of colors, a demi-lion rampant Argent, holding in dexter paw a laurel branch Vert

=== Revolutionary War ===
The Indiana National Guard's roots began in pre-Independence North America. Around the time of the Beaver Wars, French colonists established trading posts and villages, forming militias for their defense. When the American Revolutionary War began, many militias in modern-day Indiana, Illinois and Kentucky declared for the United States against the British. To express his support, militia Captain François Riday Busseron commissioned the first American flag of Indiana in 1778. Militias in southern-Indiana, aided by George Rogers Clark and Piankeshaw natives, captured Fort Sackville in February 1779, an important British fort in the Ohio River Valley.

=== Indiana Territory ===
After the American victory in the Revolutionary War, on 25 July 1788 Governor Arthur St. Clair, the first governor of the newly purchased Northwest Territory, published a law organizing the territory's militias into an official armed force of the United States. The Northwest Territory proved difficult to subdue, however, as the local Miami and Shawnee tribes resisted the United States. This resistance escalated to begin the Northwest Indian War, as many American generals, still fresh from their victory over the British, took it upon themselves to defeat any resistance to the rapidly expanding United States. The War began horribly for the United States, and in quick succession the United States suffered two horrendous defeats in the 1790 Harmar campaign and the 1791 St. Clair's defeat - still to this day the most decisive defeat in the history of the American military.

After the failures of Harmar and St. Clair, General Anthony Wayne reorganized and expanded the Continental Army, calling his force the Legion of the United States. Wayne marched his army into the Northwest Territory, where he broke America's string of bad luck with his decisive victory at the 1794 Battle of Fallen Timbers. After his victory, he marched into Indiana and founded Fort Wayne, Indiana.

The Northwest Territory was broken up upon Ohio's admittance into the Union, and was renamed the Indiana Territory in 1800. The Indiana National Guard traces its unbroken history to 1801, when Indiana's first governor, William Henry Harrison, formed the Indiana Legion to defend settlers against the aggressive actions of the Native American tribes in the territory. Years later, in 1807, Harrison founded the Indiana Rangers, modeling them after General Wayne's mounted troops used at the Battle of Fallen Timbers. The Indiana Legion was charged with the defense of all settlements in the Territory, while the Rangers were tasked with safeguarding the Buffalo Trace, the main transportation route between Louisville, Kentucky and Vincennes.

This era in Indiana history was particularly hazardous, as the Shawnee leader Tecumseh sought to unify the tribes of the Indiana Territory and drive the Americans out. Tensions climaxed when Harrison led the Indiana Legion, 1000 strong, to attack Tecumseh's capital of Prophetstown. Outside of Prophetstown, the Legion was ambushed early in the morning of November 7, 1811. The Legion and Rangers held their ground for two hours, defeating the ambush and burning Prophetstown to the ground. Over the next two years, simultaneously with the War of 1812, Harrison and the Indiana Legion continued to battle against Tecumseh's confederacy, chasing him into Canada and taking part in Tecumseh's final defeat at the 1813 Battle of the Thames. The Legion continued to fight the British in Canada until the cessation of the war in 1815.

Tragically, between the movement of Indiana's capital from Vincennes to Corydon, Indiana, and then again to Indianapolis, most documents regarding the Indiana Legion have been lost. In one unfortunate incident, a janitor sold a wagon load of official Legion papers as "waste paper."

=== Mexican-American War ===
Indiana units were first officially called to federal service in 1846, taking part in the Mexican–American War. General Joseph Lane's Indiana Brigade played a critical role on American army's left flank in the Battle of Buena Vista, a critical battle that routed the Mexican Army and open the way for Mexico's rapid occupation.

=== American Civil War ===
Indiana answered Abraham Lincoln's call to federal service against the Confederacy. Indiana's governor, Oliver P. Morton, is famously remembered as one of Lincoln's "war governors," and stalwartly pledged Indiana's support for the Union. Indiana committed over 200,000 soldiers throughout the war, with Indiana units serving in some of the most famous units of the Union Army, including the Iron Brigade, the Lightning Brigade, and Colonel Eli Lilly's 18th Indiana Battery of Light Artillery. Indiana units on average suffered approximately 35% casualties throughout the war. With so many Hoosiers serving in the Union Army, the Indiana Legion was reactivated to guard the home front, taking part in the Battle of Corydon. After the war, the Indiana Legion was renamed the Indiana National Guard in 1895.

=== Twentieth century ===
The Indiana National Guard took part in its first overseas operations in the Spanish–American War, taking part in the occupation of the Philippines. After the war, the Militia Act of 1903 organized the various state militias into the present National Guard system, making state forces easier to federalize and improving the quality of professionalism and training. Fort Benjamin Harrison was established north of Indianapolis in 1906 as both a Regular Army post and the headquarters of the Indiana Army National Guard.

In 1916, the Indiana guard was mobilized to patrol the Mexican border as part of the Mexican Border War. The next year in 1917, Indiana Guardsmen were mobilized as the United States joined World War I. It was in this year that the modern organization of the Indiana National Guard took form, with the creation of the 38th Infantry Division at Camp Shelby, MS and the 113th Aero Squadron, the predecessor of the 181st Intelligence Wing. The 150th Field Artillery Regiment, the successors of Eli Lilly's 18th Battery of Light Artillery, saw extensive action in 1918 under the command of Indiana legend Robert Tyndall, who would later serve as commander of the 38th Infantry Division, mayor of Indianapolis, and would be vital to the founding of the American Legion.

After World War I, amendments were made to the National Defense Act of 1916 which codified the National Guard as a permanent part of the United States Army. The final amendment in 1921 allowed the National Guard to "preserve the names, numbers and other designations, flags and records of the division that served in the World War." Stout Army Airfield was established in 1926, serving as the headquarters for the Indiana Guard's Army Air Corps.

After the United States of America joined World War II, the Indiana Guard was once again federalized. Camp Atterbury was established in 1942, training hundreds of thousands of Soldiers until the war's conclusion. The 38th Infantry Division was activated at Camp Shelby, Mississippi, and would serve in the Pacific from 1944 to 1945, earning the nickname "Avengers of Bataan."

After World War II, the Army debated the necessity of a separate National Guard at all, deciding finally in 1947 to maintain the unique dual-status purpose of the National Guard. From 1947, the Indiana National Guard has had an unbroken federally-recognized status. Indiana Guard units served in the Korean War, and famously had one of only eight Army National Guard units- and the only National Guard Infantry company- sent to the Vietnam War - Company D (Ranger), 151st Infantry Regiment, which gained the moniker "The Indiana Rangers." Company D is recognized as the spiritual successors to the Indiana Rangers established prior to Indiana's statehood. During their one-year deployment to Vietnam, "Delta Company" was awarded 510 medals for valor and service, making it one of the most decorated units in United States Army history.

After the Vietnam War, Chief of Staff Creighton Abrams saw the negative effects of President Lyndon B. Johnson's decision to use the draft rather than activate the National Guard and Reserve. In response, he made it the policy of the United States Army that going forward, the U.S. will never again go to war without calling up the Guard.

With the revitalization of the National Guard, the Indiana National Guard was federally activated in much larger numbers in the last years of the 20th century. Taking on their full duty as a dual-purpose force, the Indiana National Guard served in response to hurricanes, natural disasters, and were activated to serve in the 1991 Gulf War and the U.S. intervention during the Bosnian War and the Kosovo War.

=== Twenty-first century ===
Following the September 11 attacks, the Indiana Guard was further expanded and had a significant part in the Iraq and Afghanistan Wars, serving in Operation Iraqi Freedom, Operation Enduring Freedom, and Operation Spartan Shield. Indiana Guard units were present during the 2004 elections in Afghanistan and the 2005 elections in Iraq. The Indiana Army National Guard has also deployed in support of operations at Joint Task Force-Guantanamo Bay, Cuba. As of 2020, 133 Indiana Guardsmen had been killed in action in Iraq and Afghanistan. As recently as 2022, Indiana Guard units are present in Kuwait and Kosovo.

== Indiana Army National Guard ==
As of February 2026 the Indiana Army National Guard consists of the following units:

- Joint Force Headquarters-Indiana, Army Element, in Franklin
  - Headquarters and Headquarters Detachment, Joint Force Headquarters-Indiana, Army Element, in Franklin
  - Indiana Recruiting & Retention Battalion, in Franklin
  - Indiana Medical Detachment, in Franklin
  - Camp Atterbury-Muscatatuck Training Center, in Edinburgh
  - Army Aviation Support Facility #1, at Shelbyville Airport
  - Army Limited Aviation Support Facility #1, at Gary/Chicago Airport
  - Combined Support Maintenance Shop #1, in Indianapolis
  - Combined Support Maintenance Shop #2, at Camp Atterbury-Muscatatuck
  - Unit Training Equipment Site #1, at Camp Atterbury-Muscatatuck
  - Field Maintenance Shop #3, in Alexandria
  - Field Maintenance Shop #5, in Richmond
  - Field Maintenance Shop #6, in Danville
  - Field Maintenance Shop #7, in Shelbyville
  - Field Maintenance Shop #8, in New Albany
  - Field Maintenance Shop #8, in Terre Haute
  - Field Maintenance Shop #6, in Evansville
  - Field Maintenance Shop #10, in Fort Wayne
  - Field Maintenance Shop #12, in Elkhart
  - Field Maintenance Shop #13, in Gary
  - Field Maintenance Shop #14, in Lafayette
  - Field Maintenance Shop #19, in Jasper
  - Field Maintenance Shop #20, in Bloomington
  - 38th Infantry Division, at Stout Field
    - Headquarters and Headquarters Battalion, 38th Infantry Division, at Stout Field
      - Headquarters Support Company, 38th Infantry Division, at Stout Field
        - Detachment 1, Headquarters Support Company, 38th Infantry Division, in Columbus (OH) — (Ohio Army National Guard)
      - Company A (Operations), Headquarters and Headquarters Battalion, 38th Infantry Division, at Stout Field
      - Company B (Intelligence and Sustainment), Headquarters and Headquarters Battalion, 38th Infantry Division, at Stout Field
      - Company C (Signal), Headquarters and Headquarters Battalion, 38th Infantry Division, in Anderson
      - 38th Infantry Division Band, at Stout Field
    - 76th Mobile Brigade Combat Team, in Lawrence
      - Headquarters and Headquarters Company, 76th Mobile Brigade Combat Team, in Lawrence
      - 1st Battalion, 151st Infantry Regiment, in Columbus
        - Headquarters and Headquarters Company, 1st Battalion, 151st Infantry Regiment, in Columbus
        - Company A, 1st Battalion, 151st Infantry Regiment, in Greenfield
        - Company B, 1st Battalion, 151st Infantry Regiment, in Martinsville
        - Company C, 1st Battalion, 151st Infantry Regiment, at Stout Field
        - Company D (Weapons), 1st Battalion, 151st Infantry Regiment, in Washington
      - 2nd Battalion, 151st Infantry Regiment, in South Bend
        - Headquarters and Headquarters Company, 2nd Battalion, 151st Infantry Regiment, in South Bend
        - Company A, 2nd Battalion, 151st Infantry Regiment, at Gary/Chicago Airport
        - Company B, 2nd Battalion, 151st Infantry Regiment, in Logansport
        - Company C, 2nd Battalion, 151st Infantry Regiment, in Warsaw
          - Detachment 1, Company C, 2nd Battalion, 151st Infantry Regiment, in Peru
        - Company D (Weapons), 2nd Battalion, 151st Infantry Regiment, in Frankfort
      - 1st Battalion, 293rd Infantry Regiment, in Fort Wayne
        - Headquarters and Headquarters Company, 1st Battalion, 293rd Infantry Regiment, in Fort Wayne
        - Company A, 1st Battalion, 293rd Infantry Regiment, in Hartford City
        - Company B, 1st Battalion, 293rd Infantry Regiment, in Fort Wayne
        - Company C, 1st Battalion, 293rd Infantry Regiment, in Angola
        - Company D (Weapons), 1st Battalion, 293rd Infantry Regiment, in Bluffton
      - 1st Battalion, 163rd Field Artillery Regiment, in Evansville
        - Headquarters and Headquarters Battery, 1st Battalion, 163rd Field Artillery Regiment, in Evansville
          - Detachment 1, Headquarters and Headquarters Battery, 1st Battalion, 163rd Field Artillery Regiment, in Lawrence (supports 76th Mobile Brigade Combat Team Headquarters)
          - Detachment 2, Headquarters and Headquarters Battery, 1st Battalion, 163rd Field Artillery Regiment, in Columbus (supports 1st Battalion, 151st Infantry Regiment)
          - Detachment 3, Headquarters and Headquarters Battery, 1st Battalion, 163rd Field Artillery Regiment, in Fort Wayne (supports 1st Battalion, 293rd Infantry Regiment)
          - Detachment 4, Headquarters and Headquarters Battery, 1st Battalion, 163rd Field Artillery Regiment, in South Bend (supports 2nd Battalion, 151st Infantry Regiment)
        - Battery A, 1st Battalion, 163rd Field Artillery Regiment, in Evansville
        - Battery B, 1st Battalion, 163rd Field Artillery Regiment, in Vincennes
        - Battery C, 1st Battalion, 163rd Field Artillery Regiment, in Indianapolis
      - 113th Light Support Battalion, in Muncie
        - Headquarters and Headquarters Company, 113th Light Support Battalion, in Muncie
        - Company A (Distribution), 113th Light Support Battalion, in Muncie
        - Company B (Maintenance), 113th Light Support Battalion, in Richmond
        - Company C (Medical), 113th Light Support Battalion, in Anderson
        - Company D (Forward Support), 113th Light Support Battalion, in Scottsburg — attached to 1st Squadron, 152nd Cavalry Regiment
        - Company E (Forward Support), 113th Light Support Battalion, in Lawrence — attached to 776th Brigade Engineer Battalion
        - Company F (Forward Support), 113th Light Support Battalion, in Evansville — attached to 1st Battalion, 163rd Field Artillery Regiment
        - Company G (Forward Support), 113th Light Support Battalion, in Bedford — attached to 1st Battalion, 151st Infantry Regiment
        - Company H (Forward Support), 113th Light Support Battalion, in Fort Wayne — attached to 1st Battalion, 293rd Infantry Regiment
        - Company J (Forward Support), 113th Light Support Battalion, in South Bend — attached to 2nd Battalion, 151st Infantry Regiment
    - 38th Combat Aviation Brigade, at Shelbyville Airport
      - Headquarters and Headquarters Company, 38th Combat Aviation Brigade, at Shelbyville Airport
      - 1st Battalion (Assault), 137th Aviation Regiment, at Rickenbacker International Airport (OH) — (Ohio Army National Guard)
        - Company C, 1st Battalion (Assault), 137th Aviation Regiment, at Shelbyville Airport (UH-60M Black Hawk)
          - Detachment 1, Headquarters and Headquarters Company, 1st Battalion (Assault), 137th Aviation Regiment, at Shelbyville Airport
          - Detachment 1, Company D (AVUM), 1st Battalion (Assault), 137th Aviation Regiment, at Shelbyville Airport
          - Detachment 1, Company E (Forward Support), 1st Battalion (Assault), 137th Aviation Regiment, at Shelbyville Airport
      - 2nd Battalion (Security & Support), 151st Aviation Regiment, at Donaldson Center Airport (SC) — (South Carolina Army National Guard)
      - 2nd Battalion (General Support Aviation), 238th Aviation Regiment, at Shelbyville Airport
        - Headquarters and Headquarters Company, 2nd Battalion (General Support Aviation), 238th Aviation Regiment, at Shelbyville Airport
          - Detachment 1, Headquarters and Headquarters Company, 2nd Battalion (General Support Aviation), 238th Aviation Regiment, at Peoria Air National Guard Base (IL) — (Illinois Army National Guard)
          - Detachment 2, Headquarters and Headquarters Company, 2nd Battalion (General Support Aviation), 238th Aviation Regiment, at Donaldson Center Airport (SC) — (South Carolina Army National Guard)
          - Detachment 3, Headquarters and Headquarters Company, 2nd Battalion (General Support Aviation), 238th Aviation Regiment, at Capital City Airport (KY) — (Kentucky Army National Guard)
          - Detachment 4, Headquarters and Headquarters Company, 2nd Battalion (General Support Aviation), 238th Aviation Regiment, at Buckley Space Force Base (CO) — (Colorado Army National Guard)
        - Company A (CAC), 2nd Battalion (General Support Aviation), 238th Aviation Regiment, at Buckley Space Force Base (CO) (UH-60L Black Hawk) — (Colorado Army National Guard)
        - Company B (Heavy Lift), 2nd Battalion (General Support Aviation), 238th Aviation Regiment, at Peoria Air National Guard Base (IL) (CH-47F Chinook) — (Illinois Army National Guard)
          - Detachment 1, Company B (Heavy Lift), 2nd Battalion (General Support Aviation), 238th Aviation Regiment, at Donaldson Center Airport (SC) — (South Carolina Army National Guard)
        - Company C (MEDEVAC), 2nd Battalion (General Support Aviation), 238th Aviation Regiment, at Gary/Chicago Airport (HH-60L Black Hawk)
          - Detachment 1, Company C (MEDEVAC), 2nd Battalion (General Support Aviation), 238th Aviation Regiment, at Capital City Airport (KY) — (Kentucky Army National Guard)
          - Detachment 2, Company C (MEDEVAC), 2nd Battalion (General Support Aviation), 238th Aviation Regiment, at McEntire Joint National Guard Base (SC) — (South Carolina Army National Guard)
        - Company D (AVUM), 2nd Battalion (General Support Aviation), 238th Aviation Regiment, at Gary/Chicago Airport
          - Detachment 1, Company D (AVUM), 2nd Battalion (General Support Aviation), 238th Aviation Regiment, at Buckley Space Force Base (CO) — (Colorado Army National Guard)
          - Detachment 2, Company D (AVUM), 2nd Battalion (General Support Aviation), 238th Aviation Regiment, at Peoria Air National Guard Base (IL) — (Illinois Army National Guard)
          - Detachment 3, Company D (AVUM), 2nd Battalion (General Support Aviation), 238th Aviation Regiment, at Donaldson Center Airport (SC) — (South Carolina Army National Guard)
          - Detachment 4, Company D (AVUM), 2nd Battalion (General Support Aviation), 238th Aviation Regiment, at Capital City Airport (KY) — (Kentucky Army National Guard)
        - Company E (Forward Support), 2nd Battalion (General Support Aviation), 238th Aviation Regiment, at Shelbyville Airport
          - Detachment 1, Company E (Forward Support), 2nd Battalion (General Support Aviation), 238th Aviation Regiment, at Buckley Space Force Base (CO) — (Colorado Army National Guard)
          - Detachment 2, Company E (Forward Support), 2nd Battalion (General Support Aviation), 238th Aviation Regiment, at Peoria Air National Guard Base (IL) — (Illinois Army National Guard)
          - Detachment 3, Company E (Forward Support), 2nd Battalion (General Support Aviation), 238th Aviation Regiment, at Donaldson Center Airport (SC) — (South Carolina Army National Guard)
          - Detachment 4, Company E (Forward Support), 2nd Battalion (General Support Aviation), 238th Aviation Regiment, at Capital City Airport (KY) — (Kentucky Army National Guard)
        - Company F (ATS), 2nd Battalion (General Support Aviation), 238th Aviation Regiment, in Franklin
        - Company G (MEDEVAC), 2nd Battalion (General Support Aviation), 238th Aviation Regiment, at Hammond Northshore Airport (LA) (HH-60L Black Hawk) — (Louisiana Army National Guard)
          - Detachment 1, Company G (MEDEVAC), 2nd Battalion (General Support Aviation), 238th Aviation Regiment, at Reno Stead Airport (NV) — (Nevada Army National Guard)
          - Detachment 2, Company G (MEDEVAC), 2nd Battalion (General Support Aviation), 238th Aviation Regiment, at Isla Grande Airport (PR) — (Puerto Rico Army National Guard)
        - Detachment 3, Company B, 2nd Battalion (Fixed Wing), 245th Aviation Regiment (Detachment 10, Operational Support Airlift Activity), at Indianapolis Airport (C-12 Huron)
        - Detachment 1, Company C, 1st Battalion (Security & Support), 376th Aviation Regiment, at Shelbyville Airport
      - 638th Aviation Support Battalion, in Lafayette
        - Headquarters Support Company, 638th Aviation Support Battalion, in Lafayette
        - Company A (Distribution), 638th Aviation Support Battalion, in Lafayette
        - Company B (AVIM), 638th Aviation Support Battalion, at Akron-Canton Airport (OH) — (Ohio Army National Guard)
          - Detachment 1, Company B (AVIM), 638th Aviation Support Battalion, at Raleigh–Durham Airport (NC) — (North Carolina Army National Guard)
          - Detachment 2, Company B (AVIM), 638th Aviation Support Battalion, at Shelbyville Airport
          - Detachment 3, Company B (AVIM), 638th Aviation Support Battalion, at Barnes Air National Guard Base (MA) — (Massachusetts Army National Guard)
        - Company C (Signal), 638th Aviation Support Battalion, in Lafayette
    - 38th Division Sustainment Brigade, in Kokomo
      - 38th Division Sustainment Troops Battalion, in Kokomo
        - Headquarters and Headquarters Company, 38th Division Sustainment Brigade, in Kokomo
        - 138th Adjutant General Detachment (Theater Gateway — Personnel Accountability Team), at Stout Field
        - 215th Medical Company (Area Support), in Franklin
        - 338th Signal Company, in Elwood
        - 738th Medical Company (Area Support), in Lafayette
        - 909th Quartermaster Platoon (Field Feeding), in Kokomo
          - Detachment 2, 909th Quartermaster Platoon (Field Feeding), in Lafayette
          - Detachment 3, 909th Quartermaster Platoon (Field Feeding), at Stout Field
        - 915th Quartermaster Platoon (Field Feeding), in Huntington
          - Detachment 1, 915th Quartermaster Platoon (Field Feeding), in Terre Haute
          - Detachment 2, 915th Quartermaster Platoon (Field Feeding), at Camp Atterbury-Muscatatuck
          - Detachment 3, 915th Quartermaster Platoon (Field Feeding), in Crawfordsville
          - Detachment 4, 915th Quartermaster Platoon (Field Feeding), in Monticello
          - Detachment 5, 915th Quartermaster Platoon (Field Feeding), in Jasper
      - 138th Finance Battalion, at Stout Field
        - Headquarters and Headquarters Detachment, 138th Finance Battalion, at Stout Field
        - 176th Finance Company, at Stout Field
        - 177th Finance Company, at Stout Field
        - 178th Finance Company, at Stout Field
      - 190th Transportation Battalion (Motor), in Michigan City
        - Headquarters and Headquarters Detachment, 190th Transportation Battalion (Motor), in Michigan City
        - 1638th Transportation Company (Medium Truck) (POL, 5K GAL), in Remington
          - Detachment 1, 1638th Transportation Company (Medium Truck) (POL, 5K GAL), in Hammond
      - 519th Division Sustainment Support Battalion, in Terre Haute
        - Headquarters and Headquarters Company, 519th Division Sustainment Support Battalion, in Terre Haute
        - Company A (Composite Supply Company), 519th Division Sustainment Support Battalion, in Brazil
        - Company B (Support Maintenance Company), 519th Division Sustainment Support Battalion, in Indianapolis
        - Company C (Composite Truck Company), 519th Division Sustainment Support Battalion, in Franklin
          - Detachment 1, Company C (Composite Truck Company), 519th Division Sustainment Support Battalion, in Elkhart
    - 219th Engineer Brigade, in Franklin
      - Headquarters and Headquarters Company, 219th Engineer Brigade, in Franklin
      - 738th Signal Company, Lafayette
      - 113th Engineer Battalion, in Gary
        - Headquarters and Headquarters Company, 112th Engineer Battalion, in Gary
        - Forward Support Company, 112th Engineer Battalion, in Gary
        - 713th Engineer Company (Sapper), in Valparaiso
        - 719th Engineer Detachment (Fire Fighting Team — HQ), at Camp Atterbury-Muscatatuck
        - 819th Engineer Detachment (Fire Fighting Team — Fire Truck), at Camp Atterbury-Muscatatuck
        - 919th Engineer Detachment (Fire Fighting Team — Fire Truck), at Camp Atterbury-Muscatatuck
        - 1019th Engineer Detachment (Fire Fighting Team — Fire Truck), at Camp Atterbury-Muscatatuck
        - 1313th Engineer Company (Engineer Construction Company), at Camp Atterbury-Muscatatuck
        - 1413th Engineer Company (Vertical Construction Company), in North Vernon
      - 2nd Battalion, 150th Field Artillery Regiment, in Bloomington (M777A2) (part of 138th Field Artillery Brigade)
        - Headquarters and Headquarters Battery, 2nd Battalion, 150th Field Artillery Regiment, in Bloomington
        - Battery A, 2nd Battalion, 150th Field Artillery Regiment, in Greencastle
        - Battery B, 2nd Battalion, 150th Field Artillery Regiment, in Danville
        - Battery C, 2nd Battalion, 150th Field Artillery Regiment, in Lebanon
        - 139th Forward Support Company, in Crawfordsville
  - 81st Troop Command, in Franklin
    - Headquarters and Headquarters Company, 81st Troop Command, in Franklin
    - Company C, 2nd Battalion, 20th Special Forces Group (Airborne), at Camp Atterbury-Muscatatuck
    - 38th Military Police Company (Combat Support), in Monticello
    - 53rd Civil Support Team (WMD), in Indianapolis
    - 120th Public Affairs Detachment, in Franklin
    - 135th Chaplain Detachment, in Indianapolis
    - 138th Military History Detachment, at Stout Field
    - 338th Quartermaster Company (Theater Aerial Delivery) (Airborne), in Fort Wayne
    - 381st Military Police Company (Combat Support), in Plymouth
    - 384th Military Police Company (Combat Support), in Jasper
      - Detachment 1, 384th Military Police Company (Combat Support), in Evansville
    - 387th Military Police Company (Detention), at Camp Atterbury-Muscatatuck
    - 938th Military Police Detachment (Law Enforcement), in Rensselaer
    - 939th Military Police Detachment (Law Enforcement), in Indianapolis
    - 1938th Support Detachment (Contracting Team), at Stout Field
    - 1976th Support Detachment (Contracting Team), at Stout Field
    - 127th Cyber Protection Battalion, at Stout Field (part of 91st Cyber Brigade)
      - Headquarters and Headquarters Company, 127th Cyber Protection Battalion, at Stout Field
      - 137th Cyber Security Company, at Stout Field
      - 147th Cyber Warfare Company, at Stout Field
  - 54th Security Force Assistance Brigade, at Stout Field
    - Headquarters and Headquarters Company, 54th Security Force Assistance Brigade, at Stout Field
    - 1st Battalion (Infantry), 54th Security Force Assistance Brigade, in Columbus (GA) (Georgia Army National Guard)
    - 2nd Battalion (Infantry), 54th Security Force Assistance Brigade, in Pinellas Park (FL) (Florida Army National Guard)
    - 3rd Battalion (Cavalry), 54th Security Force Assistance Brigade, in Gainesville (FL) (Florida Army National Guard)
    - 4th Battalion (Field Artillery), 54th Security Force Assistance Brigade, in Dallas (TX) (Texas Army National Guard)
    - 5th Battalion (Brigade Engineer), 54th Security Force Assistance Brigade, in Columbus (OH) (Ohio Army National Guard)
    - 6th Battalion (Brigade Support), 54th Security Force Assistance Brigade, at Rock Island Arsenal (IL) (Illinois Army National Guard)
  - 138th Regiment, Regional Training Institute, at Camp Atterbury-Muscatatuck

Aviation unit abbreviations: CAC — Command Aviation Company; MEDEVAC — Medical evacuation; AVUM — Aviation Unit Maintenance; AVIM — Aviation Intermediate Maintenance; ATS — Air Traffic Service

== Indiana Air National Guard ==
=== Indiana Air National Guard Headquarters ===
- Headquarters and Headquarters Company

=== 122nd Fighter Wing ("Blacksnakes") ===
- 122nd Operations Group
- 163rd Fighter Squadron
- 122nd Maintenance Group
- 122nd Mission Support Group
- 122nd Medical Group

=== 181st Intelligence Wing ("Racers") ===
- 181st Mission Support Group
- 181st Intelligence Group
- 181st Medical Group
- 113th Air Support Operations Squadron

== See also ==
- Indiana Naval Militia
