= 113th Engineer Battalion (United States) =

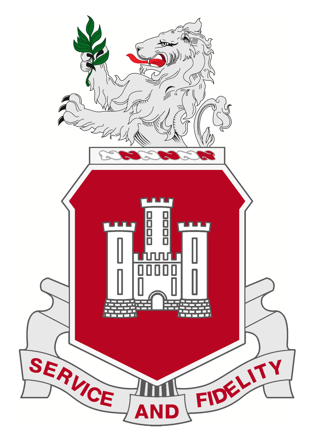
- Coat of Arms
- Active: 1917–1919; 1921–present
- Country: United States of America
- Branch: Indiana Army National Guard
- Type: Engineer
- Part of: 219th Engineer Brigade
- Garrison/HQ: Gary, Indiana
- Nickname: "Iron Men"
- Motto: SERVICE AND FIDELITY
- Engagements: World War I World War II; Operation Iraqi Freedom; Operation Enduring Freedom
- Decorations: Presidential Unit Citation; Valorous Unit Award; Meritorious Unit Commendation

The 113th Engineer Battalion is an Engineer unit of the Indiana Army National Guard with a record of accomplishment in both peace and war. Their missions include providing sustained engineer support across the full spectrum of military operations and engineering. The 113th Engineer Battalion traces its lineage to the 1st Separate Battalion Engineers in 1917.

The Battalion nickname is "Ironmen."

== Current units ==
- Headquarters and Headquarters Company
- Forward Support Company
- 713th Company (Sapper)
- 1313th Company (Horizontal Construction)
- 1413th Company (Vertical Construction)

== Unit History ==
=== World War I ===
Prior to 1917, the United States Army was smaller than 13 of the nations already involved in World War I. On the day the United States entered the War, the Army consisted of 127,151 Soldiers supplemented by 181,620 National Guardsmen. To build a proper Army, Congress approved a $3 billion budget and passed the Selective Service Act of 1917. 4 million men were drafted into service, significantly expanding the US Army. New units were activated, and existing units were reassigned to meet the Army's needs.

The First Separate Battalion Engineers, Indiana National Guard was mustered at Camp Peggs, Terre Haute and Indianapolis on March 15, 1917 and inducted into federal service on June 20, 1917. After being transported to Camp Shelby, Separate Battalions of Engineers from Indiana, Kentucky and West Virginia were consolidated into a single engineer battalion on August 5, 1917. Finally, on September 19, 1917, the consolidated engineer battalion was designated as the 113th Engineers, 38th Infantry Division, with Colonel John C. Oakes, Corps of Engineers, as the first regimental commander. Training began after that, in October 1917.

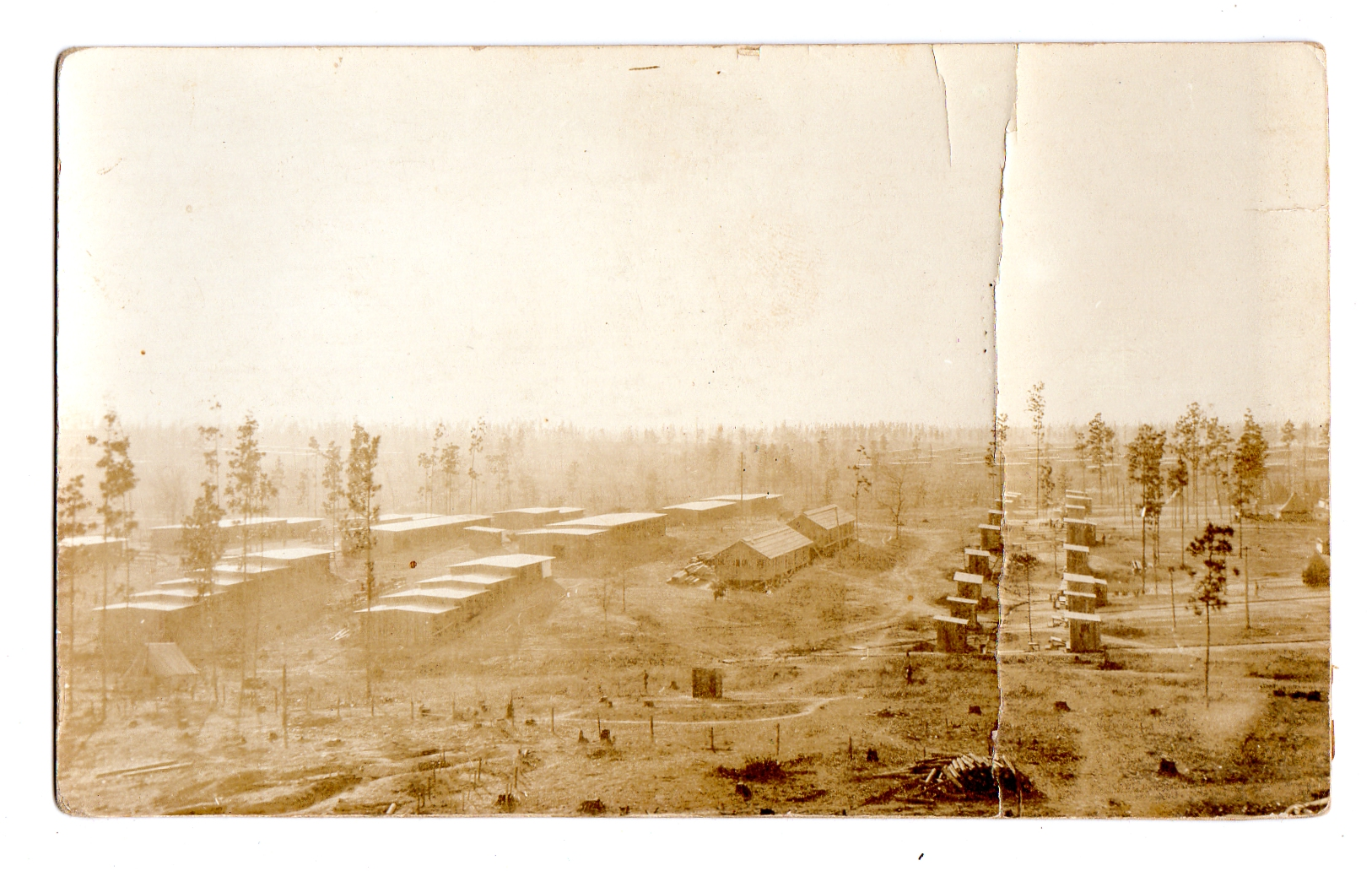
113th Engineer Camp at Camp Shelby, MS in 1917

The 113th Engineer Regiment arrived at the port of Brest on September 28, 1918, during the height of the Meuse-Argonne Offensive. While most of the 38th ID was stripped down to serve as replacements for units already in combat, the 113th Engineers assisted in constructing bases and infrastructure for the American Expeditionary Forces, of which nearly 10,000 soldiers were still arriving every day. From Brest, France, the 113th and other engineering units built nearly 1,000 miles of standard-gauge tracks and over 100,000 miles of telephone and telegraph lines. After Armistice Day, 11 November 1918, the 38th Infantry Division was assigned to the city of Konz in Allied-occupied Rhineland. There they remained until they returned to the United States in Spring of 1919. The 113th was mustered out of service on June 24, 1919.

=== Interwar Period (1920–41) ===
The 113th Engineer Combat Regiment was reactivated in 1920, with its first training period at Camp Knox from August 7 to August 21, 1921. The regiment was initially split between Indiana and Kentucky, but completely allocated to Indiana in 1921, with Colonel A.P. Melton serving as Regimental Commander from 1923-1932.

In the coming decades, the 113th Engineers served during the Ohio River flood of 1937, evacuating more than 3,400 people and building more than seventy storage reservoirs to reduce Ohio River flood heights, a project that would continue into the early 1940s. The 113th also served with other National Guard units in Wisconsin during the 1940 Armistice Day Blizzard, assisting in rescue efforts for survivors trapped in 27 inches of snow, as well as rebuilding the telegraph/telephone poles and buildings that had been damaged in the 50–80 mph winds.

As France fell to Nazi Germany, and tensions continued to grow with Imperial Japan, the 38th Infantry Division was once again ordered into federal service. On January 17, 1941, the 113th Engineers were inducted into the Army of the United States and departed for Camp Shelby on January 25, 1941. Eleven months later, Imperial Japan bombed Pearl Harbor, and the United States entered World War II.

=== Training for World War II ===
As Army doctrine progressed, the 38th Infantry Division was triangularized on March 28, 1942. This involved splitting the 113th Engineer Regiment into two separate battalions. 1st Battalion, 113th Engineer Regiment became the 113th Engineer Combat Battalion, which included Companies H & S, A, B, C, and the Medical Detachment. 2nd Battalion, 113th Engineer Regiment became the 131st Engineer Battalion. The 113th began training for the Pacific front, arriving in Louisiana on August 23, 1942. There, they participated in maneuvers with the 1st Cavalry Division, conducted amphibious training at Camp Carrabelle, Florida, and completed advanced training at Camp Livingston, Louisiana. The 38th Infantry Division completed its training in December 1943, and departed from the New Orleans Port of Embarkation, destined for Oahu. The 113th Engineers were transported on the Dutch ship SS Sloterdijk, arriving on January 17, 1944.

In Oahu, the 38th Infantry Division was assigned to the defense of Oahu, while simultaneously receiving additional jungle training. The 113th's additional training focused on demolitions, booby traps, bayonet training, infiltration, jungle living, house-to-house fighting, judo, and bridge building. On June 12, 1944, the 38th embarked to New Guinea, anchoring at Oro Bay. The 113th was transported on the SS Alcoa Polaris.

From July to November 1944, they conducted final combat rehearsals, made realistic by the presence of Japanese soldiers bypassed during the Western New Guinea campaign. Once rehearsals were complete and New Guinea was consolidated, the 38th sailed for Leyte, landing in December 1944. The 113th Engineers brought with them 400 tons of assault and pioneering equipment, 140 tons of 30-day engineer supplies, and a complete "Bailey Bridge" unit weighing over 89 tons.

=== Philippines Campaign ===
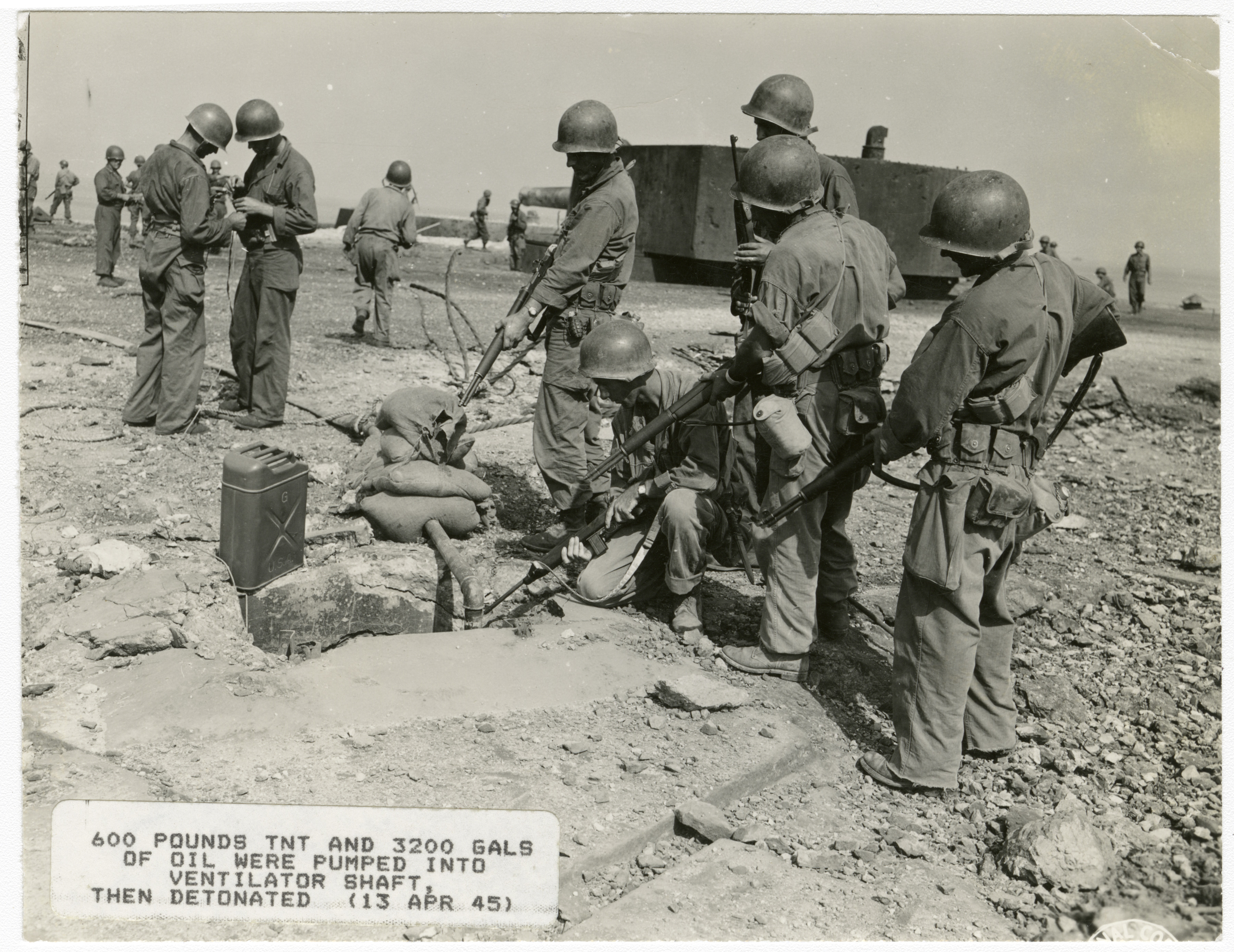
113th Engineer Battalion Soldiers in the Philippines, 1945

A Company, 113th Engineers landed on Leyte with the 149th RCT on December 6, 1944, with the rest of the battalion close behind. For two months the 113th Engineers assisted in the defense of Leyte, including defending Buri, Bayug, and San Pablo airstrips from Japanese paratroopers. The 38th then embarked for Luzon, the largest island of the Philippines and the site of the Bataan Death March three years earlier. The 113th Engineers landed in the Zambales Province without any opposition on 29 January. For the next two days, they assisted in securing and building defensive structures at the San Marcelino airstrip and the port facilities at Olongapo, as well as the Grande Island in Subic Bay after a separate amphibious landing. Over the next month, the 113th would take part in many of the key efforts of the Philippines Campaign.

The Bataan Peninsula was secured on 21 February – the 38th Infantry Division's rapid drive through Route 7 (known to the division as Zig-Zag Pass) and across the peninsula was critical to General MacArthur's campaign plan to retake the Philippines.

Over the next several months, the 113th would assist in the final liberation of the Philippines from Imperial Japan, including the Liberation of Corregidor. During the battle, the Japanese used several fortified islands to hold on to Manila Bay. The 113th Engineers and the 151st Infantry Regiment assaulted and captured Fort Hughes and Fort Wint, using white phosphorus mortar rounds and 2,500 US gallons (9,500 L) of a diesel/gasoline mix that they pumped into the forts through a vent.

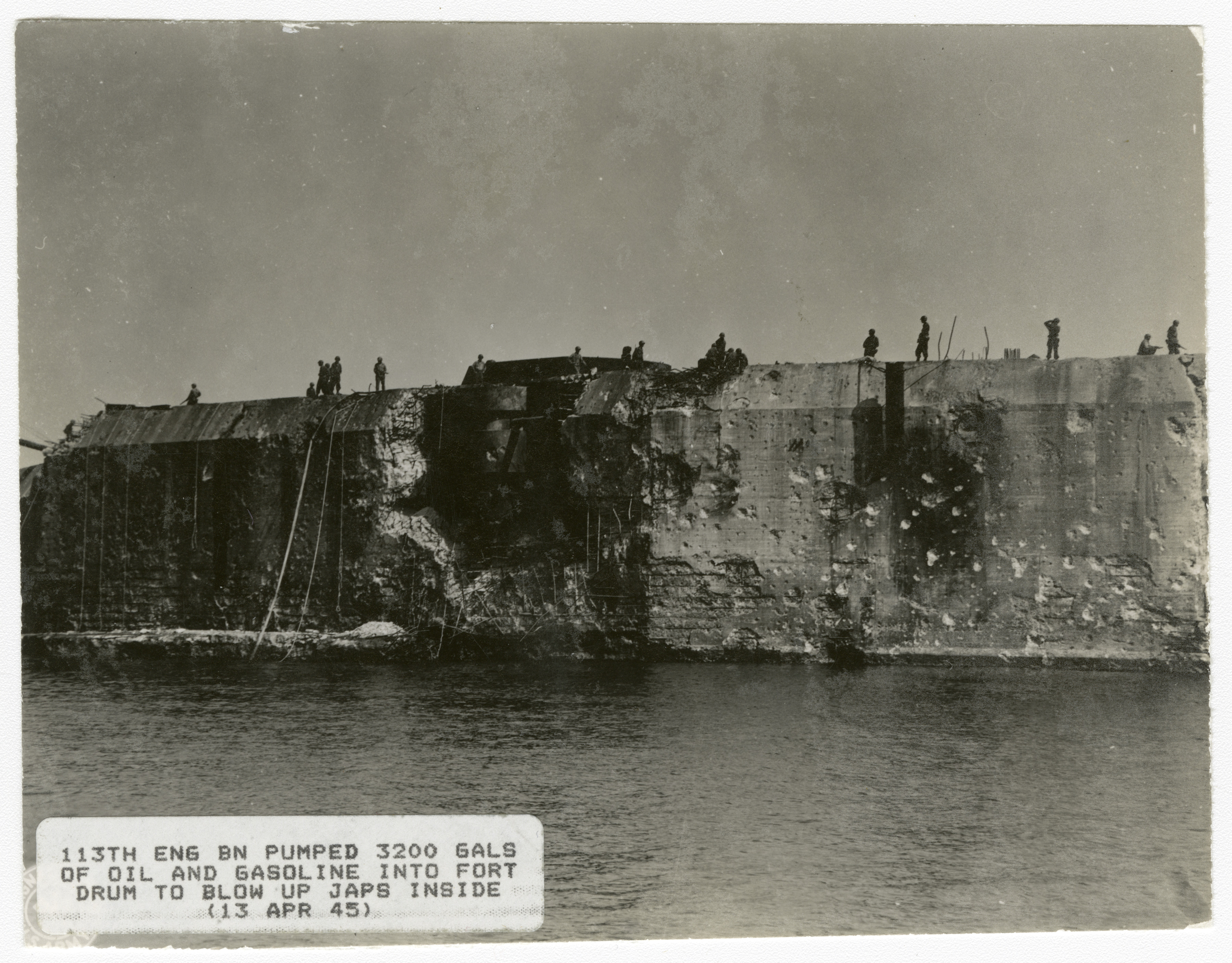
Fort Drum after being destroyed by the 113th Engineer Battalion and 151st Infantry Regiment, Philippines, 1945

This left Fort Drum as the last position in Manila Bay held by the Japanese. It was a nearly impenetrable fortress built by the United States in 1909, with 6 meter (20-ft) thick reinforced concrete walls and four 14-inch turret guns. After heavy aerial and naval bombardment with little result, a detachment from the 113th Engineers and F Company, 151st Infantry Regiment were assigned to neutralize Fort Drum. The 113th Engineers altered their technique, using TNT and incendiary grenades to detonate the diesel/gasoline mixture that was pumped into a vent. The explosion ejected a 1-ton hatch 300 ft (91m) into the air and blew out parts of the fort's reinforced concrete walls. The fall of Fort Drum marked the end of Japanese resistance in Manila Bay.

In April, the 38th Infantry Division advanced directly into the Zambales mountains, pushing out the last of the dug-in Japanese defenders. The 113th Engineers were instrumental in surrounding the retreating Japanese and cutting off their withdrawal routes. After the Zambales were cleared, the 38th moved east of Manila, where they continued fighting into May. By 30 June, all effective Japanese positions had been broken. The 113th Engineers spent the rest of the war assisting in hunting down bypassed Japanese soldiers, as well as improving defensive capabilities of American and Philippine positions. This concluded with Japan's unconditional surrender on August 15, 1945, bringing an end to the 113th Engineers' unbroken stretch of 198 consecutive days in combat. Combined, elements of the 38th Infantry Division killed 26,469 enemy combatants and took 1,411 prisoners. As news of the war's end spread to the remaining Japanese defenders, that number soon swelled to 13,000 prisoners by October.

=== Post-War and Cold War ===
The 113th Engineers were alerted on 15 September 1945 that they were going to return to the United States and demobilize and were relieved on 5 October. They sailed to Camp Anza, California. Final demobilization and deactivation were completed on 9 November 1945 at Camp Atterbury. Subordinate units of the 38th were organized and reconstituted, swelled by the large numbers of World War II veterans. The 113th Engineers were reorganized on 6 October 1946, and were federally recognized on 5 March 1947. 38th Division headquarters were once again in Indianapolis, and Annual Training began being held at Camp Atterbury in 1948.

During the Cold War, the 113th Engineers served in the Strategic Reserve to support the Active Army in the event of a full-scale war with the Soviet Union. The 113th continued to serve the home front, being called up for State Active Duty during the Perfect Circle Strike of 1955, as well as the 1965 Palm Sunday tornado outbreak.

=== Global War on Terrorism ===
The 113th Engineer Battalion was deployed to Mosul, Iraq in support of Operation Iraqi Freedom in 2004. They conducted Soldier Readiness Processing at Camp Atterbury in late 2004, and arrived in-country between mid-December 2004 to early-January 2005. They operated in Nineveh Governorate, Iraq for the entirety of their 12-month deployment, engaging with enemy forces in combat several times. The 113th was home by the end of 2005 with no combat deaths.

In 2009, the 1613th Engineer Company deployed to Jalalabad, Afghanistan in support of Operation Enduring Freedom. The same year, the 1313th Engineer Company deployed to Mosul, Iraq.

In March 2012, the Battalion was awarded the Valorous Unit Award for their performance in Operation Founding Fathers during Iraq's 2005 elections.

In 2011, the 713th Engineer Company was alerted they were deploying to Kandahar, Afghanistan. They mobilized for training in October, and arrived in-country in November 2011. Their mission for the 10-1/2-month deployment was to patrol roads and clear roadside IEDs around Forward Operating Base (FOB) Frontenac in support of Operation Enduring Freedom.

In two separate incidents, the 713th Engineer Company suffered six casualties during this deployment. The first was on 6 January 2012, when the third vehicle in an eight-vehicle convoy hit a roadside IED. SSG Jonathan Metzger, SPC Robert Tauteris Jr., SPC Brian Leonhardt (posthumously promoted to SGT), and SPC Christopher Patterson were killed in the explosion, with a fifth soldier, PFC Douglas Rachowicz suffering multiple injuries as a result of the blast. Six months later on 17 July 2012, two more 713th soldiers, SPC Sergio Perez and SPC Nicholas Taylor, were killed in action during a mounted route clearance attack. Within the Indiana National Guard, the six 713th Engineer Company soldiers who were killed during the 2012 deployment are remembered as 'The Sapper Six.'

In September 2019, the 113th Engineer Battalion mobilized for a deployment to Kuwait, Saudi Arabia, and Afghanistan. They returned home September 2020.

== Distinctive unit insignia ==
- Description

A silver metal and enamel device 1 5/32 inches (2.94 cm) in height, consisting of a shield, crest and motto.

- Symbolism

The silver triple-towered castle, taken from the arms of Saint-Dizier in France, denotes the battalion's World War I service. The shield is red and the charge is white, the colors of the U.S. Army Corps of Engineers. The crest is that of the Indiana Army National Guard.

- Background

The distinctive unit insignia was originally approved on 26 May 1928 for the 113th Engineer Regiment, consisting of the shield and motto. The design was changed to add the crest on 5 June 1936. It was re-designated for the 113th Engineer Combat Battalion on 19 November 1943. The insignia was once again re-designated for the 113th Engineer Battalion on 23 September 1963.
