= Shelbyville Municipal Airport (Indiana) =

- IATA: none; ICAO: KGEZ; FAA LID: GEZ

Summary
- Airport type: Public
- Owner: Shelbyville Board of Aviation Commissioners
- Serves: Shelbyville, Indiana
- Elevation AMSL: 803 ft / 245 m
- Coordinates: 39°34′59″N 085°48′17″W

Map
- Location of airport in Indiana GEZ (the United States)

Runways
Direction	Length		Surface
Direction	ft	m	Surface
1/19	5,000	1,524	Asphalt
9/27	2,671	814	Turf

Statistics (2006)
- Aircraft operations: 24,094
- Based aircraft: 60
- Source: Federal Aviation Administration

Shelbyville Municipal Airport (ICAO: KGEZ, FAA LID: GEZ) is a public use airport located four nautical miles (7 km) northwest of the central business district of Shelbyville, in Shelby County, Indiana, United States. The airport is owned by the city of Shelbyville and is controlled by the mayor and an appointed Board of Commissioners. According to the FAA's National Plan of Integrated Airport Systems for 2009–2013, it was classified as a general aviation airport.

Although most U.S. airports use the same three-letter location identifier for the FAA and IATA, this airport is assigned GEZ by the FAA but has no designation from the IATA.

== Facilities and aircraft ==
Shelbyville Municipal Airport covers an area of 550 acres (220 ha) at an elevation of 803 feet (245 m) above mean sea level. It has two runways: 1/19 is 5,000 by 100 feet (1,524 x 30 m) with an asphalt pavement; 9/27 is 2,671 by 190 feet (814 x 58 m) with a turf surface.

For the 12-month period ending December 31, 2006, the airport had 24,094 aircraft operations, an average of 66 per day: 91% general aviation, 5% military, and 4% air taxi. At that time there were 60 aircraft based at this airport: 88% single-engine, 10% multi-engine, and 2% jet.

== Military use ==
The airport is home of the headquarters of the 38th Combat Aviation Brigade (CAB), 38th Infantry Division, Indiana National Guard.

== See also ==
- List of airports in Indiana
