= Operation Toan Thang III =

Part of the Vietnam War (1969)

- Part of Vietnam War
Date	17 February – 31 October 1969 (8 months and 2 weeks)
Location	III Corps, South Vietnam
Result	Allied operational success

Belligerents
United States; South Vietnam	(Provisional Revolutionary Government of the Republic of South Vietnam) Viet Cong; North Vietnam

Commanders and leaders
(United States) MG Walter T. Kerwin Jr. LTG Julian Ewell (South Vietnam) LTG Đỗ Cao Trí	

Units involved
(United States) 1st Infantry Division; 9th Infantry Division; 25th Infantry Division; 1st Cavalry Division; 3rd Brigade, 82nd Airborne Division; 11th Armored Cavalry Regiment; 199th Light Infantry Brigade; 12th Combat Aviation Group; River Patrol Force (TF-116) (South Vietnam) 5th Division; 18th Division; 25th Division; Airborne Division	1st Division; 5th Division; 7th Division; 9th Division

Casualties and losses
(United States) 1,533 killed	U.S body count: 41,803 killed 3,299 captured

Operation Toan Thang III ("Complete Victory") was a U.S. Army and Army of the Republic of Vietnam (ARVN) operation conducted between 17 February and 31 October 1969 in the Vietnam War. The operation was designed to keep pressure on Vietcong (VC) and People's Army of Vietnam (PAVN) forces in III Corps.

== Background ==
The operation was a continuation of Operation Toan Thang II in the same operational area and with largely the same forces.

== Operation ==
=== February ===
On 17 February at 00:36 a mechanized infantry unit of the 2nd Brigade, 25th Infantry Division in a night defensive position 7 miles (11 km) southwest of Bến Cát received ground probe which was repelled with unknown enemy losses. An OH-6 Cayuse light observation helicopter was shot down 14 miles (23 km) northwest of Bến Cát. On 18 February at 11:15 a company from the 1st Brigade, 25th Infantry Division patrolling with ARVN Regional Forces (RF) southeast of Phú Cường found a 10-ton weapons and munitions cache. At 18:15 a reconnaissance unit from the 3rd Brigade, 9th Infantry Division operating 7 miles (11 km) southeast of Tân An found the graves of 11 PAVN/VC.

On 19 February at 07:45 helicopter gunships of the 1st Squadron, 9th Cavalry Regiment, 1st Cavalry Division engaged 12 enemy soldiers 22 miles (35 km) northwest of Xuân Lộc, aerorifle troops were landed and found 15 bodies in the strike area. At 11:00 the aerorifle troops engaged an enemy force killing 21 PAVN/VC and capturing one and five individual and one crew-served weapons; U.S. losses were one killed. At 15:30 troops from the 1st Brigade, 1st Cavalry Division found a nine-ton food cache 4 miles (6.4 km) northeast of Phú Cường.

On 20 February at 22:30 a unit from the 3rd Brigade, 25th Infantry Division in a night defensive position 10 miles (16 km) southeast of Phú Cường detected movement on their perimeter and then received 82 mm mortar fire followed by a ground attack at 02:18. The enemy withdrew at dawn leaving 28 PAVN/VC dead and three individual and four crew-served weapons. A UH-1 Iroquois was shot down 18 miles (29 km) southwest of Tây Ninh. On 21 February at 14:30 two companies from the 1st Brigade, 25th Infantry Division patrolling 14 miles (23 km) northwest of Tây Ninh found a 320-ton rice cache. On 22 February at 18:50 the 1/9th Cavalry engaged an enemy force 13 miles (21 km) south of Đồng Xoài killing ten.

On 23 February at 01:15 Patrol Base Diamond I 5 miles (8.0 km) southwest of Go Dau Ha occupied by the 2nd Battalion, 27th Infantry Regiment was attacked by a PAVN force resulting in 109 PAVN killed and 15 U.S. killed. At 02:45 a firebase occupied by a unit of the 3rd Brigade, 25th Infantry Division located 6 miles (9.7 km) southeast of Dầu Tiếng Base Camp was attacked resulting in 38 PAVN/VC killed and eight individual and two crew-served weapons and a radio captured; U.S. losses were three killed, among them was Staff sergeant Robert W. Hartsock who smothered an enemy satchel charge with his body, an action for which he was posthumously awarded the Medal of Honor. At 17:55 mechanized infantry from the 2nd Brigade, 25th Infantry Division engaged an enemy unit 4 miles (6.4 km) east of Dầu Tiếng, artillery and air support were provided and 23 PAVN/VC were killed and four individual weapons captured. At 21:30 troops from the 1st Brigade, 1st Infantry Division ambushed an enemy force 6 miles (9.7 km) north of Phú Cường killing 12 PAVN/VC and capturing eight individual and one crew-served weapons. On 24 February at 10:45 a unit of the 2nd Brigade, 1st Infantry Division operating 9 miles (14 km) west-northwest of Saigon engaged an enemy force killing 16 and capturing nine. At 22:40 a United States Navy Patrol Boat, River (PBR) on a canal 3 miles (4.8 km) northwest of Cần Đước District was fired on by two Sampans and returned fire killing 12 VC.

On 25 February at 01:50 a unit of the 3rd Brigade, 9th infantry Division engaged an enemy company 6 miles (9.7 km) northwest of Tân An in an hourlong battle. A sweep of the area found 27 PAVN/VC dead and one captured and five individual and six crew-served weapons. At 02:00 a base camp of the 3rd Brigade, 25th Infantry Division received 95 rounds of 82/120 mm mortar fire and 40 rounds of 107/122 mm rocket fire followed by a ground attack which continued until the enemy withdrew at 06:30 leaving eight dead; U.S. losses were one killed. Between 02:30 and 05:00 an enemy force attacked a firebase 5 miles (8.0 km) southwest of Go Dau Ha occupied by a unit of the 2nd Brigade, 25th Infantry Division. The defenders were supported by artillery and AC-47 Spooky gunship fire killing 78 PAVN/VC and capturing one and seven individual weapons and one light machinegun; U.S. losses were one killed. At 03:30 a firebase 6 miles southeast of Dầu Tiếng occupied by a unit of the 3rd Brigade, 25th Infantry Division received 150 rounds of mortar and Rocket-propelled grenade (RPG) fire followed by a ground attack. The enemy withdrew after an hour leaving 25 dead, five captured, five individual and five crew-served weapons; U.S. losses were one killed. At 07:30 an ambush patrol from the 2nd Brigade, 1st Infantry Division engaged an enemy force 10 miles (16 km) east-northeast of Saigon killing two and capturing five AK-47 rifles and one RPG launcher. A nearby sampan was found to contain a munitions cache. At midday mechanized infantry from the 2nd and 3rd Brigades, 25th Infantry Division engaged an enemy force 3 miles (4.8 km) southeast of Dầu Tiếng, the enemy withdrew at 14:00 leaving 23 dead.

On 26 February as part of the Tet 1969 attacks, at 03:00, a force of approximately 400 men from the VC 275th Regiment, 5th Division, had infiltrated into the tiny village of Thai Hiep on the outskirts of Biên Hòa. About 85 per cent of the force was estimated to be PAVN soldiers. At about 03:00, as reconnaissance elements of the unit were observed and engaged by United States Air Force (USAF) security forces at the perimeter of Bien Hoa Air Base, the villagers began to flee their homes, running down streets and creek beds. The villagers met elements of the South Vietnamese 5th Marine Battalion, the 3rd Battalion, 48th Infantry Regiment, 18th Division and the 3rd Squadron, 5th Armored Cavalry moving on the road less than 0.5 miles (0.80 km) from Thai Hiep in response to the contact at the air base. The villagers told the ARVN forces how they were driven out of their homes and confined to an area near a creek running alongside the village. At that time, the air base security forces reported that they had lost contact with the enemy reconnaissance element which withdrew east toward Thai Hiep. The ARVN units swiftly moved into blocking positions, and by daybreak, the PAVN/VC were surrounded. Additional RF elements moved in and the ARVN troops continued to contain the PAVN/VC forces until 11:00 when assault forces, in the form of the ARVN 36th Ranger Battalion, reinforced the contact. By 15:00 the 36th Ranger Battalion moved into the village attacking the PAVN/VC force. The series of assaults met heavy resistance by the battalion of PAVN who had turned the villagers' sandbagged shelters into a series of well-fortified defensive positions. ARVN psychological operations units broadcast repeated loud-speaker appeals and warnings, and all of the remaining villagers and several wounded PAVN/VC evacuated out of Thai Riep. Just after 16:00 USAF F-100s and F-4s along with Republic of Vietnam Air Force A-1 Skyraiders were directed against the PAVN/VC positions in the village. Following the employment of the supporting fires, the 36th Ranger Battalion moved back into the village. The Rangers met only slight, disorganized resistance. By 01:00 the next morning, the bodies of 264 PAVN/VC soldiers lay in the village and 87 had been captured or surrendered. More than 100 individual and crew-served weapons were captured. ARVN casualties were ten killed and 100 wounded and one US Army photographer was killed. The prisoners revealed that their mission had been to attack Biên Hòa city and the Bien Hoa Air Base. At 10:30 troops from the 3rd Brigade, 1st Cavalry Division engaged an enemy force 4 miles (6.4 km) east of Dầu Tiếng. The unit was later reinforced by a unit from the 3rd Brigade, 25th Infantry Division and together they killed 46 PAVN/VC, destroyed 150 bunkers and captured one individual and two crew-served weapons.

On 27 February at 12:10 a unit of the 11th Armored Cavalry Regiment (11th ACR) sweeping an area 6 miles (9.7 km) west of Phước Vĩnh Base Camp discovered a 1.5 ton weapons cache containing 29 AK-47s, three SKS rifles, one RPG-2 launcher, one RPG-7 launcher and assorted other munitions. At 13:45 a unit of the 3rd Brigade, 1st Cavalry Division engaged an entrenched enemy force 12 miles (19 km) northeast of Biên Hòa. Artillery fire was directed onto the bunkers and 50 secondary explosions were observed. A later search of the area found 38 PAVN/VC dead; U.S. losses were one killed. At 14:30 a unit of the 3rd Brigade, 1st Cavalry Division sweeping an area 3 miles (4.8 km) east of Dầu Tiếng engaged an enemy unit killing 17 and capturing one. At 19:30 a unit of the 1st Brigade, 9th Infantry Division and air cavalry from the 164th Combat Aviation Group engaged an enemy force 6 miles (9.7 km) northwest of Cái Bè District killing 36 PAVN/VC. At 20:30 helicopter gunships from the 12th Combat Aviation Group destroyed two sampans killing ten VC 8 miles (13 km) east of Cần Đước. An OH-6 was shot down 3 miles (4.8 km) northeast of Trảng Bàng District.

On 28 February at 09:50 the armored cavalry squadron of the 25th Infantry Division engaged an enemy company 9 miles (14 km) northeast of Go Dau Ha. Infantry from the 1st Brigade, 25th Infantry Division reinforced and the enemy withdrew in the afternoon leaving 28 dead and one captured and five individual and one crew-served weapons; U.S. losses were two killed. At 10:30 a unit of the 11th ACR engaged an enemy force 5 miles (8.0 km) northeast of Lai Khê, other U.S. units reinforced and the enemy withdrew at 14:00 leaving 16 dead and nine captured. At 11:25 a unit of the 2nd Brigade, 25th Infantry Division engaged an enemy squad 6 miles (9.7 km) east of Trảng Bàng, the enemy broke contact but the armored cavalry pursued and reengaged them killing 11; U.S. losses were one killed and one Kit Carson Scout killed. A UH-1 was shot down 13 miles (21 km) north-northeast of Tây Ninh.

Operational results for the month were 1,689 PAVN/VC killed and 288 captured and 522 individual and 185 crew-served weapons captured. U.S. losses were 130 killed.

=== March ===
On 1 March at 15:00 USAF jets attacked a bunker 9 miles (14 km) west-southwest of Hiệp Hòa causing two secondary explosions. An aerial observer saw 28 PAVN/VC dead in the strike area and two bunkers, 12 structures and 11 sampans destroyed. An OH-6 was shot down 13 miles (21 km) north-northeast of Tây Ninh killing two crewmen. Another OH-6 was shot down 3 miles (4.8 km) northwest of Sông Bé. On 2 March at 10:30 a unit of the 199th LIB found a 10-ton rice cache 10.5 miles (16.9 km) southwest of Saigon. At 12:45 a unit of the 3rd Brigade, 9th Infantry Division operating 2 miles (3.2 km) south of Rach Kien found a weapons cache containing 14 SKS, three AK-47s and four automatic rifles. At 14:30 a unit of the armored cavalry squadron of the 25th Infantry Division engaged an enemy force 7 miles (11 km) northeast of Go Dau Ha. The unit was reinforced at 16:20 by another squadron unit and supported by artillery and helicopter gunships. The enemy withdrew at 18:00 leaving 19 dead and one captured; U.S. losses were two killed.

On 3 March at 04:55 three 122 mm rockets hit Saigon killing 12 civilians. At 11:10 a unit of the 2nd Brigade, 1st Cavalry Division operating 5 miles (8.0 km) west of Sông Bé found the graves of 11 PAVN/VC, all had been killed by small arms fire in the preceding day. At 11:20 a mechanized unit from the 1st Brigade, 25th Infantry Division operating 6 miles (9.7 km) southeast of Phú Cường found 7 graves containing 12 PAVN/VC dead, all had been killed in the preceding day. At 12:30 scouts from the 2nd Brigade, 1st Cavalry Division operating 12 miles (19 km) south of An Lộc observed ten PAVN/VC on a flatbed truck and called in helicopter gunships on the location killing all ten. At 20:55 five 92 mm mortar rounds landed near the Newport Bridge causing minimal damage. On 4 March a FAC operating 10 miles (16 km) west of An Lộc observed 30-35 PAVN/VC and directed artillery, helicopter gunships and airstrikes onto the location killing 29. At 07:00 infantry from the 2nd Brigade, 25th Infantry Division engaged a PAVN company 5 miles (8.0 km) northeast of Trảng Bàng supported by artillery, helicopter gunships and airstrikes. At 08:15 another Brigade unit was air-assaulted into the area and at 12:30 mechanized infantry also joined the battle which continued into the night. At 04:45 on 5 March the PAVN assaulted the U.S. positions before finally withdrawing at dawn. PAVN losses were 179 killed and 68 weapons captured; U.S. losses were 11 killed. At 10:00 air cavalry troops from the 11th ACR engaged an enemy force 4 miles (6.4 km) south-southwest of Phước Vĩnh. An hour later infantry from the 1st Infantry Division were air-assaulted into the area and other regiment units joined the battle forcing the enemy to withdraw leaving 23 dead and 12 captured and two crew-served weapons.

On 5 March at 15:45 an armored unit of the 25th Infantry Division engaged an enemy force 4 miles (6.4 km) northeast of Trảng Bàng. The battle continued until the enemy withdrew at 19:00 leaving 21 dead; U.S. losses were four killed. On 6 March at 06:00 six 122 mm rockets hit Saigon killing 22 civilians and destroying 17 houses. At 14:30 a unit of the 3rd Brigade, 25th Infantry Division engaged an enemy force 9 miles (14 km) southeast of Phú Cường killing 51 and capturing two individual weapons; U.S. losses were one killed. On 7 March at 00:30 U.S. Navy PBRs attacked a sampan 2 miles (3.2 km) southeast of Hiệp Hòa killing 12 PAVN/VC. At 22:10 a 25th Infantry Division firebase 7 miles (11 km) southeast of Dầu Tiếng was attacked. The enemy withdrew after 30 minutes leaving nine dead and three captured and eight individual and two crew-served weapons. On 8 March at 01:30 a unit of the 2nd Brigade, 1st Cavalry Division in a night defensive position 5 miles (8.0 km) southwest of Go Dau Ha received mortar fire followed by a ground attack. The unit returned fire supported by artillery and helicopter gunships and the enemy withdrew; U.S. loses were seven killed. In the early morning a PAVN Battalion attacked a night defensive position of a unit of the 1st Brigade, 1st Cavalry Division 4 miles (6.4 km) northeast of Phú Cường, the PAVN withdrew at 08:00 leaving 154 dead and 23 individual and eight crew-served weapons (including two flamethrowers); U.S. losses were 11 killed. At 14:10 a unit of the 3rd Brigade, 1st Cavalry Division found a munitions cache 12 miles (19 km) northeast of Biên Hòa containing 154 82 mm mortar rounds, 246 RPG-2 grenades, 59 RPG-7 grenades and 10,000 rounds of 7.62×39 mm ammunition. At 15:20 helicopter gunships from the 12th Combat Aviation Group killed 15 PAVN 6 miles (9.7 km) east of Trà Cú District.

On 9 March at 03:15 a unit of the 1st Brigade, 1st Cavalry Division engaged an enemy company 7 miles (11 km) southwest of Go Dau Ha supported by artillery, helicopter gunships and AC-47s killing 34 PAVN/VC; U.S. losses were 14 killed. At 03:30 a unit of the 1st Infantry Division was ambushed by an enemy force 4 miles (6.4 km) east of Nhà Bè losing nine killed. At 04:00 a platoon from the 3rd Brigade, 9th Infantry Division engaged 15–20 PAVN/VC 5 miles (8.0 km) northeast of Dầu Tiếng, the platoon directed artillery and helicopter gunship fire onto the enemy who withdrew after ten minutes leaving 17 dead and seven individual weapons. At 08:30 a unit of the 25th Infantry Division called in airstrikes on a bunker complex 12 miles (19 km) northwest of Tây Ninh destroying 166 bunkers and killing 11 PAVN/VC. At 09:30 a unit of the 1st Brigade, 1st Cavalry Division found 11 122 mm rockets 3 miles (4.8 km) southwest of Hiệp Hòa. At 11:10 a company from the 3rd Brigade, 1st Cavalry Division operating 16 miles (26 km) northeast of Biên Hòa received fire from an entrenched enemy force. The company attacked the bunkers supported by artillery, helicopter gunships and airstrikes killing 24 PAVN/VC; U.S. losses were two killed. At midday a unit of the 11th ACR found a weapons cache 4 miles west of Phước Vĩnh containing 20 107 mm rockets, 11 light machine guns, an 82 mm mortar and three AK-47s. At 13:40 helicopter gunships from the 25th Infantry Division attacked 50 PAVN/VC 9 miles (14 km) northeast of Go Dau Ha killing ten. On 10 March at 18:00 a FAC observed 20 PAVN moving 14 miles (23 km) south-southeast of Katum and directed helicopter gunships and airstrikes against them killing 18 and destroying four bunkers.

On 11 March at 00:05 the Nhà Bè Fuel Farm was hit by five 107 mm rockets causing minimal damage. At 01:25 a unit of the armored cavalry squadron of the 25th Infantry Division in a night defensive position 9 miles (14 km) southeast of Phú Cường was attacked by a PAVN company. The unit returned fire supported by artillery, helicopter gunships and AC-47 fire. The PAVN withdrew after an hour leaving 38 dead, three captured and ten weapons. At 01:40 a night defensive position of a unit of the 1st Brigade, 1st Cavalry Division 3 miles (4.8 km) northeast of Phú Cường was attacked by an enemy battalion. The enemy withdrew after two hours leaving 86 dead and four captured and 28 individual and three crew-served weapons; U.S. losses were five killed. At 07:30 the 1/9th Cavalry engaged an enemy force 5 miles (8.0 km) northeast of Phú Cường killing 14 PAVN/VC. At 12:15 a 25th Infantry Division convoy was ambushed 11 miles (18 km) east-southeast of Tây Ninh, mechanized infantry from the 3rd Brigade, 25th Infantry Division escorting the convoy engaged the ambushers supported by artillery, helicopter gunships and airstrikes. The enemy withdrew at dusk leaving 76 dead and two captured and three crew-served weapons. At 14:00 a company from the 3rd Brigade, 1st Cavalry Division operating 16 miles (26 km) northeast of Biên Hòa engaged two companies of PAVN/VC killing 15. At 14:50 a unit of the 199th LIB found a munitions cache 10 miles (16 km) northwest of Bến Lức containing 138 82 mm mortar rounds.

On 12 March at 12:15 a unit of the 1st Brigade, 25th Infantry Division was attacked 9 miles (14 km) north of Tây Ninh, the unit returned fire and the enemy withdrew at 16:45 leaving 19 dead; U.S. losses were one killed. From 19:40 to 21:40 helicopter gunships from the 12th Combat Aviation Group operating 19 miles (31 km) south-southwest of An Lộc attacked an enemy force killing 18. An OH-6 was shot down 7 miles (11 km) northeast of Dầu Tiếng. On 14 March at 01:15 a unit of the 3rd Brigade, 1st Infantry Division supported by artillery and helicopter gunships attacked an enemy force 15 miles (24 km) north-northeast of Biên Hòa killing 15 PAVN/VC and capturing five individual weapons. At 12:45 a unit of the 1st Brigade, 1st Cavalry Division found a munitions cache 6 miles (9.7 km) northwest of Trà Cú containing 1,027 82 mm mortar rounds, 1,188 60 mm mortar rounds, 149 57 mm recoilless rifle rounds, 486 RPG grenades, 3,916 12.7mm rounds and 21,000 rounds of 7.62×39mm. At 14:30 five 107 mm rockets hit Dầu Tiếng Base Camp killing four Vietnamese civilian workers. At 14:30 a reconnaissance unit from the 3rd Brigade, 82nd Airborne Division found a weapons cache 4 miles (6.4 km) southeast of Đức Hòa containing five 122 mm rocket launchers.

On 15 March at 11:30 a unit from the 2nd Brigade, 25th Infantry Division operating 6 miles (9.7 km) northwest of Ben Soi was attacked by an enemy platoon. The unit returned fire supported by artillery, helicopter gunships and airstrikes and the enemy withdrew at 17:00 leaving 14 dead. At 14:45 mechanized infantry from the 1st Brigade, 25th Infantry Division received fire from a PAVN force 3 miles (4.8 km) southeast of Phú Cường, the unit returned fire and the enemy withdrew leaving 14 dead and four individual weapons. An OH-6 was shot down 14 miles (23 km) east of Biên Hòa. On 16 March at 02:30 four 122 mm rockets hit Saigon causing minimal damage. At 09:00 a unit from the 1st Brigade, 1st Cavalry Division operating 9 miles (14 km) north-northeast of Dầu Tiếng found a munitions cache containing 630 82 mm mortar rounds, six 120 mm mortar rounds and two AK-47s. At 12:15 a unit from the 1st Brigade, 1st Cavalry Division operating 6 miles southwest of Hiệp Hòa found a munitions cache containing 13 107 mm rockets and 90 RPG grenades. At 14:00 a unit from the armored cavalry squadron of the 25th Infantry Division operating 9 miles northeast of Go Dau Ha was attacked by an enemy force. The unit returned fire supported by artillery, helicopter gunships and airstrikes and the enemy withdrew at 16:30 leaving 11 dead.

On 17 March at 01:45 two enemy platoons conducted a ground probe against the night defensive position of a unit of the 3rd Brigade, 1st Cavalry Division 9 miles (14 km) north-northeast of Biên Hòa. The unit returned fire supported by artillery and helicopter gunships until the enemy withdrew at 05:45 leaving 30 dead and one individual and two crew-served weapons. At the same time two enemy platoons conducted a ground probe against the night defensive position of a unit of the 3rd Brigade, 1st Cavalry Division 9 miles northeast of Biên Hòa. The unit returned fire supported by artillery and helicopter gunships until the enemy withdrew at 05:15 leaving 33 dead and nine AK-47s and one light machine gun. At 10:00 helicopter gunships from the 11th ACR received fire 6 miles (9.7 km) northeast of Dầu Tiếng, the gunships engaged the firing position and called in artillery and airstrikes killing 28 PAVN/VC. At 18:30 scout helicopters of the 2nd Brigade, 1st Cavalry Division attacked an enemy force 5 miles (8.0 km) north of Lai Khê and directed artillery and airstrikes onto the position, 16 PAVN/VC dead were seen in the strike area.

On 18 March at 05:00 a unit of the 2nd Brigade, 25th Infantry Division in a night defensive position 5 miles (8.0 km) east of Trảng Bàng was hit by mortar fire and a ground probe. The unit returned fire supported by artillery and helicopter gunships and the enemy withdrew after one hour leaving 32 dead and 14 individual and six crew-served weapons; U.S. losses were two killed. At 06:50 a unit of the 1st Infantry Division found a rocket firing site 8 miles (13 km) east of Saigon containing six 122 mm rockets. At 07:00 helicopter gunships from the 11th ACR attacked an enemy force 11 miles (18 km) northeast of Phú Cường, the contact was lost at 19:30 with 36 PAVN/VC dead seen in the strike area. At 11:00 a unit of the 3rd Brigade, 9th Infantry Division engaged an enemy force 16 miles (26 km) northwest of Tân An killing 33 PAVN/VC and capturing seven and seven AK-47s, 142 RPG-2 grenades and ten 107 mm rockets; U.S. losses were two killed. At 11:45 a unit from the 3rd Brigade, 1st Cavalry Division patrolling 5 miles northeast of Trảng Bàng found graves containing ten PAVN/VC, all had been killed in the previous two days. At 14:00 a unit of the 3rd Brigade, 9th Infantry Division found a munitions cache 9 miles (14 km) northwest of Bến Lức containing 134,000 7.62×39mm rounds, 656 82 mm mortar rounds and 66 107 mm rockets. At 15:00 a unit of the 11th ACR supported by helicopter gunships engaged an enemy force 6 miles (9.7 km) northeast of Dầu Tiếng, the enemy withdrew at 19:15 leaving 61 dead and five captured. At 18:10 a unit of the 11th ACR received fire 5 miles northeast of Dầu Tiếng and returned fire supported by artillery and helicopter gunships. The enemy withdrew after 20 minutes leaving 20 dead and one captured. At 20:30 a unit of the 2nd Brigade, 1st Infantry Division engaged an enemy force 6 miles east of Dầu Tiếng supported by artillery, helicopter gunships and an AC-47. The enemy withdrew after two hours leaving ten dead and one RPG launcher; U.S. losses were one killed.

On 20 March at 02:25, an element of the 2nd Brigade, 25th Infantry Division, in night defensive positions about 5 miles (8.0 km) northeast of Trảng Bàng received small arms and mortar fire. The unit returned fire supported by artillery and helicopter gunships in an action that continued for about 2 hours, resulting in 26 PAVN/VC killed for the loss of one U.S. killed. At 11:30, air cavalry troops from the 11th ACR engaged an enemy force while sweeping an area 21 miles (34 km) south-southwest of An Lộc. As the contact continued, other mounted elements of the 11th ACR reinforced, using armored personnel carriers and tanks. The enemy employed heavy small arms, machine gun and RPG fire. Helicopter gunships and a unit of the 2nd Brigade, 1st Cavalry Division also reinforced the contact. Fighting continued until about 19:30. A search of the area found 70 PAVN/VC bodies, along with 48 individual weapons, U.S. casualties were one killed. At approximately 15:00 a unit of the 11th ACR discovered a 3-ton weapons, munitions and food cache 3 miles (4.8 km) northeast of Dầu Tiếng. At 23:30 that night a mechanized infantry element of the 2nd Brigade, 25th Infantry Division, in night defensive positions about 6 miles (9.7 km) northeast of Trảng Bàng received about 30 rounds of mortar fire and a ground probe. The unit returned fire with their organic weapons including .50 cal machine guns on their armored personnel carriers and artillery and helicopter gunships and an AC-47 gunship supported the unit until contact was lost at about 02:20. The bodies of 26 PAVN/VC were found in the area around the perimeter together with six individual and two crew-served weapons.

On 21 March at 02:10, a unit of the 3rd Brigade, 82nd Airborne Division in night defensive positions 15 miles (24 km) southwest of Trảng Bàng received mortar fire followed by a ground attack. The unit returned fire with organic weapons and were supported by helicopter gunships and AC-119 gunships in an action that lasted two hours. The bodies of seven PAVN/VC were found, while U.S. losses were two killed. At 02:50, a landing zone occupied by a unit of the 1st Brigade, 1st Cavalry Division 10 miles (16 km) northeast of Tây Ninh received 150 rounds of mixed 60/82 mm mortar fire. A ground attack followed at about 03:45. The unit returned fire with organic weapons and were supported by artillery and helicopter gunships along with AC-47 gunships. The enemy broke contact at about 06:45. PAVN/VC losses were five killed while U.S. losses were ten killed, among those killed was Specialist 4 Donald R. Johnston who smothered the blasts of three enemy-thrown explosives with his body, actions for which he was posthumously awarded the medal of Honor. At 11:20, a unit of the 1st Infantry Division, under the operational control of the 11th ACR, discovered a weapons cache 6 miles (9.7 km) west of Phước Vĩnh Base Camp containing 31 AK-47s and 24 RPG-2 rounds. A UH-1 was hit by ground fire and crashed 11 miles (18 km) north of Tây Ninh killing five men on board.

On 22 March at 03:30, a unit from the 1st Brigade, 1st Cavalry Division ambushed an estimated 15 PAVN/VC 4 miles (6.4 km) southwest of Go Dau Ha. The action continued for about three hours with helicopter gunships supporting the unit until the PAVN/VC withdrew leaving ten dead and one individual and one crew-served weapons. At 10:45, a unit of the 11th ACR and infantry from the 1st Infantry Division engaged an enemy force 19 miles (31 km) southwest of An Lộc. Contact was lost at about 16:30, 31 PAVN/VC were killed and 2 captured, U.S. losses were one killed. At 15:10, in the same general area, helicopter gunships from the 1/9th Cavalry engaged an enemy force 16 miles (26 km) southwest of An Lộc. Troops from the 2nd Brigade, 1st Cavalry Division, sweeping the area, engaged an enemy force about 20 minutes later and the action continued for 30 minutes before the PAVN/VC withdrew. 12 PAVN/VC were killed and one 82 mm mortar was destroyed, U.S. casualties were one killed. At 14:00, a unit of the 1/9th Cavalry engaged an enemy force while sweeping an area 18 miles (29 km) southwest of An Lộc. The PAVN/VC withdrew leaving ten dead. At 14:10, infantry from the 1st Brigade, 1st Infantry Division engaged an enemy force while sweeping an area 5 miles (8.0 km) northwest of Sông Bé. Helicopter gunships and artillery supported the infantry and another unit of the brigade reinforced. Contact continued until about 15:20, PAVN/VC losses were unknown, while the U.S. lost three killed. An OH-6 was shot down 11 miles (18 km) north of Tây Ninh killing all three on board. Another OH-6 was downed 9 miles (14 km) east of Tây Ninh killing two men on board.

On 23 March at 13:55, while sweeping an area approximately 6 miles (9.7 km) southwest of Hiệp Hòa, an element of the 3rd Brigade, 82nd Airborne Division found a 1.7-ton ammunition cache. At 21:25, a unit of the 3rd Brigade, 9th Infantry Division on patrol 7 miles (11 km) west of Rach Kien, received small arms and RPG fire. The unit returned fire with organic weapons and called for artillery support. The enemy broke contact at about 23:00. The bodies of 34 PAVN/VC and six individual and three crew-served weapons were found. On 24 March at 11:00, helicopter gunships from the 1/9th Cavalry engaged an enemy force in the open about 21 miles (34 km) southwest of An Lộc. Tactical air support was also called in until the enemy withdrew leaving 22 dead. A UH-1 was hit by ground fire and crashed 9 miles (14 km) north-northwest of Lai Khê destroying the aircraft.

On 25 March at 07:45, helicopter gunships from the 11th ACR engaged an enemy force 7 miles (11 km) south of Bến Cát. The bodies of 11 PAVN/VC and were found and two AK-47s and one 12.7mm machine gun. At 09:00, helicopter gunships from the 1/9th Cavalry, attacked several trucks in a jungle area 18 miles (29 km) northeast of Tây Ninh. Tactical air strikes were also directed onto the location and aerofifle troops assaulted into the area found five destroyed 3/4 ton trucks near a bunker complex. At 10:00, mechanized infantry from the 2nd Brigade, 25th Infantry Division, engaged an enemy force while sweeping an area 5 miles (8.0 km) northeast of Trảng Bàng. The action continued until about 16:40 resulting in 18 PAVN/VC killed and three individual and one crew-served weapon captured. At 10:15, a 25th Infantry Division convoy from Củ Chi Base Camp to Tây Ninh, was ambushed 3 miles (4.8 km) northeast of Go Dau Ha. Within 15 minutes, troops from the Division's armored cavalry squadron arrived in tanks and armored personnel carriers to reinforce the convoy. Sporadic contact continued until 19:00 with the PAVN losing 85 killed and 19 AK-47 rifles, one 82 mm mortar, five light machine guns and 2 RPG-2 launchers captured; US losses were two killed, including First lieutenant Stephen Holden Doane who was killed while destroying an enemy bunker, an action for which he was posthumously awarded the Medal of Honor. At 12:30, infantry from the 3rd Brigade, 9th Infantry Division supported by helicopter gunships from the air cavalry squadron of the 12th Combat Aviation Group, engaged an enemy force 3 miles (4.8 km) south of Cần Đước killing 11 in an hour-long engagement. At 13:00, troops from the 2nd Brigade, 1st Cavalry Division, discovered a bunker complex and graves containing 23 PAVN/VC killed in the preceding three days 18 miles (29 km) southwest of An Lộc. At about 15:30, infantry of the 3rd Brigade, 1st Infantry Division, discovered several bunkers while sweeping an area 4 miles (6.4 km) west of Lai Khê, the bunkers contained 16 complete 107 mm rockets.

On 26 March at 04:15, a unit of the 2nd Brigade, 1st Cavalry Division in night defensive positions 8 miles (13 km) north-northeast of Dầu Tiếng received mortar fire followed by a ground attack. The unit responded with organic weapons and artillery, helicopter gunship and AC-47 supporting fires. The enemy withdrew after an hour leaving two dead in the barbed wire and two individual and one crew-served weapons. U.S. losses were eight killed. At 13:30 a unit of the 2nd Brigade, 1st Cavalry Division sweeping an area 7 miles (11 km) east of Phú Cường engaged an enemy force. The troops were reinforced at 14:00 and helicopter gunships, artillery and tactical air support was given. Contact was lost at 15:10, U.S. losses were two killed while PAVN/VC losses were unknown.

On 27 March two Army helicopters were destroyed in the operational area. A UH-1 was downed 19 miles (31 km) south-southwest of An Lộc killing five on board. An AH-1 Cobra was downed 16 miles (26 km) north of Tây Ninh, killing both crewmembers. On 28 March at 02:15, a fire support base 14 miles (23 km) northwest of Lai Khê occupied by elements of the armored cavalry squadron and artillery of the 1st Infantry Division, received a ground attack. The defenders returned fire supported by an AC-47 gunship and helicopter gunships. The enemy broke contact three hours later leaving eight dead and two crew-served weapons; U.S. losses were four killed. At 10:10, the armored cavalry squadron of the 25th Infantry Division, while escorting a convoy from Củ Chi to Tây Ninh was ambushed 6 miles (9.7 km) southeast of Tây Ninh. Other armored cavalry and mechanized infantry units reinforced and supporting fires from artillery, helicopter gunships and tactical air strikes were provided in a battle that continued until 15:00. PAVN/VC losses were 66 killed and 18 individual and 3 crew-served weapons captured while U.S. losses were three killed. At 12:30, units of the armored cavalry squadron and the 2nd Brigade, 1st Infantry Division, engaged an estimate 30 PAVN/VC 6 miles (9.7 km) east-northeast of central Saigon. The contact continued for about 2.5 hours and PAVN/VC losses were 10 killed and two captured. About 1 hour prior to the contact, a UH-1 helicopter gunship was hit by ground fire and crashed in the same general area. At 12:40 a unit of the 1st Brigade, 25th Infantry Division sweeping an area 8 miles (13 km) northeast of Ben Soi discovered a weapons cache containing 28 complete 107 mm rockets. At 13:40, a unit of the 2nd Brigade, 25th Infantry Division, sweeping an area about 4 miles (6.4 km) north of Trảng Bàng engaged an enemy force until about 18:45 killing 20 PAVN/VC and capturing two crew-served weapons.

On 29 March at 08:15 units of the armored cavalry squadron of the 25th Infantry Division operating 16 miles (26 km) east-southeast of Tây Ninh engaged an enemy force. The unit was supported by artillery, helicopter gunships and tactical airstrikes until the enemy withdrew at 10:00 leaving 19 dead and two individual and two crew-served weapons. At 09:00 a unit of the 1st Brigade, 1st Cavalry Division was landed 15 miles (24 km) north of Tây Ninh where it was engaged by an enemy force, reinforcements were landed and artillery, helicopter gunship and tactical air support were provided in an engagement that continued until 20:00. U.S. losses were eight killed while PAVN/VC losses were unknown. At 11:10, a mechanized infantry unit of the 1st Brigade, 25th Infantry Division about 6 miles (9.7 km) east of Tây Ninh, received heavy fire. Contact was lost at about 19:30. In a sweep of the area the next day the bodies of 36 PAVN/VC were found. U.S. losses were two killed. At 13:40 a unit of the 199th Light Infantry Brigade located a weapons cache 4 miles (6.4 km) northeast of Bến Lức. At 14:40 mechanized infantry from the 1st Brigade, 1st Infantry Division located a weapons cache 4 miles east of Quản Lợi Base Camp.

On 30 March at 07:45 a unit of the armored cavalry squadron of the 1st Infantry Division received fire from an enemy force 6 miles (9.7 km) northeast of Dầu Tiếng. In the hourlong battle eight PAVN/VC were killed and two AK-47s and one light machine gun were captured; U.S. losses were three killed. At 09:30 a unit of the armored cavalry squadron of the 1st Infantry Division engaged a PAVN force 7 miles (11 km) northeast of Dầu Tiếng in a two hour long battle. The PAVN lost 30 killed and four AK-47s captured while U.S. losses were eight killed. At 10:00 the 1st Cavalry Division's Phước Vĩnh Base Camp received five rounds of 107 mm rocket fire, artillery was directed onto the launch site resulting in a secondary explosion. At 10:45 a unit of the 2nd Brigade, 1st Cavalry Division engaged an enemy force 6 miles (9.7 km) east-northeast of Phú Cường killing seven PAVN/VC and destroying 25 bunkers and a tunnel. At 11:30 1/9th Cavalry helicopter gunships engaged ten PAVN 6 miles east-northeast of Phú Cường killing all ten. At 11:40 a unit of the armored cavalry squadron of the 1st Infantry Division sweeping the area 5 miles (8.0 km) north-northeast of Dầu Tiếng engaged an enemy force killing seven. Another element of the squadron killed a further 38 PAVN in the same area at the same time.

Cumulative operational results to the end of March were 5,520 PAVN/VC killed, 842 captured and 1,451 individual and 419 crew-served weapons captured. U.S. losses were 414 killed.

=== April ===
On 5 April an estimated PAVN battalion attacked a firebase occupied by a unit of the 2nd Brigade, 25th Infantry Division 11 km south of Go Dau Ha. The attack was repulsed with the PAVN losing 73 killed and ten individual and one crew-served weapon captured; U.S. losses were four killed.

On 11 April the MACV and USASF Compounds in Tây Ninh received 40 107 mm rockets. Ammunition storage areas at both locations are ignited. Casualties were 30 RF killed, five civilians killed, 50 detainees, prisoners, and draft dodgers killed, 15 trucks and two gas tankers destroyed, 22,000 kg of rice, 130,000 liters of petroleum products, and an estimated 372 tons of ammunition destroyed.

On 15 April Patrol Base Diamond III (11.05°N 106.211°E) 10 km southwest of Go Dau Ha occupied by the 2nd Battalion, 27th Infantry Regiment was attacked. The attack was repulsed with 198 PAVN/VC killed and eight captured and 40 individual and 42 crew-served weapons captured; U.S. losses were 13 killed.

On 16 April elements of the 4th Battalion, 23rd Infantry Regiment found 93 PAVN bodies 20 km northwest of Ben Soi, killed by tactical airstrikes on 6 April.

On 26 April a firebase occupied by a unit of the 1st Brigade, 25th Infantry Division 20 km south of Tây Ninh was hit by 300 rounds of 82 mm mortar and 107 mm rocket fire and then attacked by an estimated two battalions. The base was supported by artillery and helicopter and fixed wing gunships and 213 PAVN/VC were killed, six captured and 35 individual and 15 crew-served weapons captured. Mechanized infantry of the 3rd Brigade, 9th Infantry Division engaged an enemy force 5 km southeast of Tân An killing 63 PAVN/VC and capturing four individual and six crew-served weapons; U.S. losses were two killed.

On 27 April and estimated battalion assaults a night defensive position of a unit of the 2nd Brigade, 25th Infantry Division 10 km northeast of Trảng Bàng. The attack was repulsed with 100 PAVN/VC killed and one captured and 32 individual and 23 crew-served weapons captured; U.S. losses were ten killed.

=== May ===
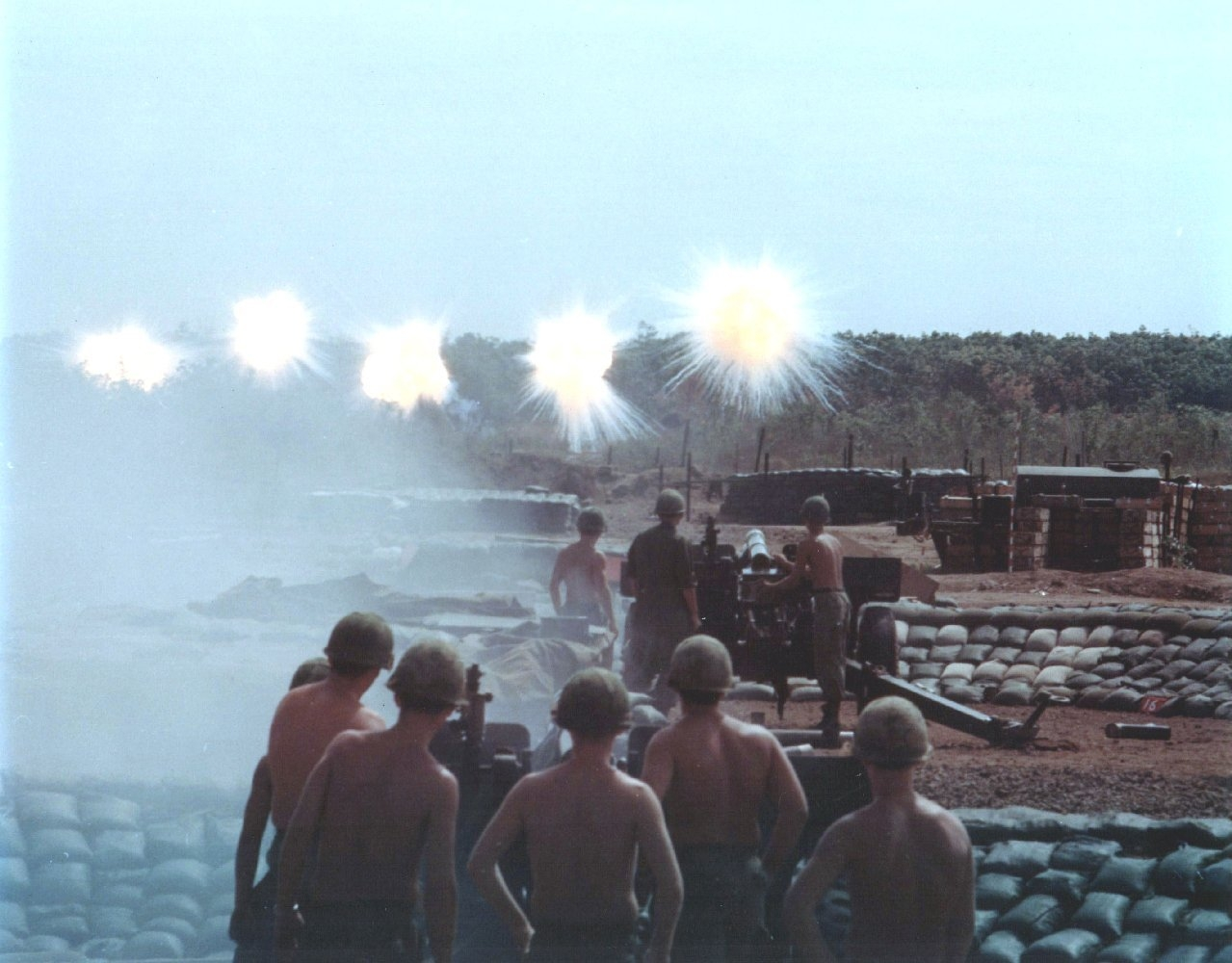
Battery C, 2nd Battalion, 77th Artillery Regiment fire from Fire Support Base Sedwick II, 2 May 1969

On 2 May at 11:15 a 1st Infantry Division supply convoy was ambushed 6 miles (9.7 km) south of An Lộc, a mechanized infantry unit arrived to support the convoy and the enemy withdrew by 11:45. PAVN/VC losses were 11 killed and one captured; U.S. losses were four killed. At 13:20 8 miles (13 km) south of Phước Vĩnh a unit of the 11th ACR found a weapons cache containing 22 individual and three crew-served weapons. At 14:45 a unit of the armored cavalry squadron of the 25th Infantry Division sweeping an area 8 miles (13 km) northeast of Go Dau Ha engaged an enemy force in a battle that continued until 19:00 resulting in 24 PAVN/VC killed and two captured and four crew-served weapons captured.

On 3 May at 08:20 an armored unit attached to the 1st Infantry Division engaged an estimated enemy platoon 10 miles (16 km) south of An Lộc. An infantry unit reinforced the armor and artillery and helicopter gunships also engaged. The enemy withdrew at 13:00 leaving 19 dead and 9 captured; U.S. losses were one killed. At 14:00 a unit of the 3rd Brigade, 82nd Airborne Division engaged an estimated enemy company while sweeping an area 5 miles (8.0 km) northeast of Trảng Bàng, another infantry unit and mechanized infantry from the 2nd Brigade, 25th Infantry Division reinforced the brief 20 minute contact resulting in 20 PAVN/VC killed. At 14:45 an aerial forward air controller (FAC) saw the bodies of 20 PAVN/VC amongst 26 bunkers destroyed in an air strike 9 miles (14 km) northeast of Go Dau Ha. At 15:30 a unit of the 3rd Brigade, 82nd Airborne Division sweeping an area 5 miles (8.0 km) southeast of Củ Chi located a weapons cache. At 17:30 an OH-6 was shot down 5 miles southeast of Lai Khê, both crewmembers were killed.

On 4 May at 00:05 a unit of the 1st Infantry Division 9 miles (14 km) southeast of Dầu Tiếng ambushed an enemy unit killing 13 and capturing three AK-47s and an RPG launcher. At 08:00 two UH-1s collided 6 miles (9.7 km) north-northwest of Bien Hoa Air Base killing all eight personnel on board. At 11:15 a unit of the 1st Brigade, 1st Cavalry Division engaged an enemy unit 9 miles (14 km) south of Katum Camp killing three; U.S. losses were four killed. At 15:35 a unit of the 3rd Brigade, 9th Infantry Division engaged 15–20 PAVN 3 miles (4.8 km) south of Bình Phước killing 11 and capturing two individual weapons. At 18:30 infantry from the 3rd Brigade, 1st Infantry Division engaged an enemy force 9 miles west of Bến Cát killing six and capturing four AK-47s; U.S. losses were one killed. On 5 May at 09:45 a unit of the 2nd Brigade, 1st Cavalry Division engaged an estimate 25 PAVN/VC in a bunker complex 9 miles (14 km) southeast of Katum. Contact was lost at 12:10, U.S. losses were three killed, enemy losses were unknown. At 11:00 an OH-6 crashed 23 miles (37 km) north-northwest of Tây Ninh. At 11:45 a unit of the 3rd Brigade, 82nd Airborne Division engaged an enemy unit 9 miles east of Trảng Bàng, the engagement continued until 12:50, PAVN/VC losses were 16 killed and four individual and one crew-served weapons captured. At 11:50 a supply convoy was ambushed 5 miles (8.0 km) northeast of Trảng Bàng in an hourlong engagement 11 PAVN/VC were killed and one U.S. killed.

On 6 May at 00:35 the 2nd Battalion, 8th Cavalry Regiment and 2nd Battalion, 19th Artillery Regiment in a night defensive position at Firebase Carolyn (11.547°N 106.167°E) 7 miles (11 km) south of Katum was attacked. The contact continued until 06:00 when the enemy withdrew leaving 101 dead and 29 captured and 47 individual and 23 crew-served weapons captured; U.S. losses were nine killed. At 03:20 a unit of the 1st Cavalry Division in a night defensive position at Landing Zone Joe (11.456°N 106.493°E) 15 miles (24 km) south-southwest of An Lộc received 150 rounds of mixed 60/82 mm mortar fire followed by an attack by fire. Helicopter gunships and artillery were called in on the direction of fire with unknown results. At 07:30 a unit of the 1st Brigade, 1st Cavalry Division observed 30 PAVN 5 miles (8.0 km) west of Katum and called in airstrikes on the area and ten bodies were seen after the strike. At 20:00 infantry from the 3rd Brigade, 9th Infantry Division engaged an enemy force 1 mile (1.6 km) northwest of Bến Lức killing nine and capturing four AK-47s. On 7 May at 11:30 troops from the armored cavalry squadron of the 25th Infantry Division found a 20-ton rice cache while searching an area 5 miles (8.0 km) northeast of Trảng Bàng. At 20:30 a U.S. aerial observer from the 1st Brigade, 25th Infantry Division saw 15-20 PAVN/VC 3 miles (4.8 km) south of Ben Soi and directed artillery fire onto the area. The observer counted 15 dead in the impact area.

On 8 May at 07:05 a unit of the 2nd Brigade, 1st Cavalry Division sweeping and area 12 miles (19 km) northeast of Tây Ninh engaged an enemy force in bunkers resulting in eight PAVN/VC killed and four U.S. killed. At 13:10 infantry from the 2nd Brigade, 25th Infantry Division accompanied by tanks engaged an entrenched PAVN force 2 miles (3.2 km) northwest of Phú Cường. The engagement continued until 17:30 resulting in 29 PAVN killed and one U.S. killed. At 20:10 a unit of the 2nd Brigade, 25th Infantry Division in a night defensive position 6 miles (9.7 km) southwest of Go Dau Ha detected enemy movement and called in artillery fire, an aerial observer reported 22 dead PAVN/VC in the impact area. On 9 May at 09:35 a unit of the 2nd Brigade, 25th Infantry Division found a weapons cache containing eight 122 mm rockets 3 miles (4.8 km) west of Phú Cường. At 10:45 a unit of the 2nd Brigade, 1st Cavalry Division sweeping and area 7 miles (11 km) northeast of Phú Cường was engaged by an enemy force killing three U.S. for two PAVN/VC killed. Also at 10:45 mechanized infantry from the 3rd Brigade, 25th Infantry Division engaged a PAVN force 5 miles (8.0 km) southeast of Dầu Tiếng. The battle continued until 18:45 and resulted in 102 PAVN killed and one captured and eight individual weapons and one light machinegun captured; U.S. losses were two killed. At 14:40 and OH-6 was hit by ground fire 7 miles (11 km) north-northeast of Go Dau Ha and crash-landed. At 17:45 infantry from the 2nd Brigade, 25th Infantry Division engaged an estimated platoon in fortified positions 9 miles (14 km) southwest of Bến Cát killing 15 in an hourlong engagement. At 18:15 helicopter gunships from the 1/9th Cavalry engaged 20 PAVN/VC in a bunker complex 8 miles (13 km) southeast of Katum killing eight.

On 10 May at 08:20 helicopter gunships from the 1/9th Cavalry attacked an entrenched enemy force 9 miles (14 km) northeast of Phú Cường and 20 bodies were observed in the area after the attack. At 10:40 armored cavalry from the 25th Infantry Division engaged an enemy force 5 miles (8.0 km) north of Trảng Bàng, the engagement continued until 15:30 resulting in 20 PAVN/VC killed and two AK-47s and one RPG launcher captured. At 14:00 helicopter gunships from the 1/9th Cavalry engaged an enemy force 14 miles (23 km) southeast of Katum, the bodies of 10 PAVN/VC were observed in the strike area. Also at 14:00 troops from the 1st Brigade, 1st Cavalry Division engaged an enemy force 6 miles (9.7 km) southwest of Katum, one U.S. was killed while enemy losses were unknown. At 14:05 an OH-6 was hit by ground fire 20 miles (32 km) northeast of Tây Ninh. At 17:00 a UH-1 was hit by ground fire and crashed 2 miles (3.2 km) south of Trảng Bàng killing four on board. At 21:40 mechanized infantry from the 2nd Brigade, 25th Infantry Division in a night defensive position 6 miles northeast of Trảng Bàng received a ground attack by a PAVN platoon. 35 PAVN were killed and 11 individual and one crew-served weapons were captured. On 11 May at 02:40 a patrol from the 11th ACR ambushed an enemy unit 7 miles (11 km) south-southwest of Xuân Lộc, helicopter gunships and AC-47s provided support until the enemy broke contact at 04:40 leaving four dead and six individual weapons. The enemy were pursued and contact reestablished at 06:30 and an element of the 1st Australian Task Force reinforced with tanks and armored personnel carriers, killing a further 14 and capturing four more individual weapons. At 13:00 troops from the 9th Infantry Division engaged an estimated enemy platoon 2 miles (3.2 km) southeast of Bến Lức killing 15 and capturing two and one individual weapon. At 14:15 helicopters from 1/9th Cavalry engaged a bunker complex supported by tactical airstrikes, killing 13 and destroying four huts and a .50 cal machine gun. An OH-6 was shot down 12 miles (19 km) east of Biên Hòa killing one crewman.

On 12 May at 00:30 a unit of the 3rd Brigade, 1st Cavalry Division in a night defensive position 13 miles (21 km) east-southeast of Katum received 300 rounds of mortar fire followed by recoilless rifle fire and then a ground probe. The action continued until 05:20 when the enemy withdrew leaving one dead and one SKS rifle; U.S. losses were two killed. At 01:35 a unit from the 2nd Brigade, 1st Cavalry Division in a night defensive position 13 miles (21 km) southeast of Katum detected an enemy force approaching their position and engaged with fire. At 03:00 the base received 200 rounds of 82 mm mortar and 107 mm rocket fire followed by a ground assault. The attackers penetrated part of the base and engaged U.S. helicopter gunships with 12.7 machineguns. The battle continued until 06:15 when the enemy withdrew leaving 73 dead; U.S. losses were seven killed. At 01:45 an 11th ACR fire support base 8 miles (13 km) northwest of Bến Cát received mortar fire and an enemy force was detected near the perimeter. Helicopter gunships and AC-47 gunship fire was directed onto the enemy location and they responded with 12.7mm machinegun fire. A sweep of the area found 28 PAVN killed and eight individual and one crew-served weapon. At 03:15 a unit of the 1st Brigade, 1st Cavalry Division in a night defensive position 4 miles (6.4 km) northeast of Phú Cường was hit by mixed 82 mm mortar and 107 mm rocket fire followed by a ground attack. Artillery, helicopter and fixed wing gunship support was provided and the enemy withdrew at 04:45 leaving 45 dead and eight RPG launchers and six individual weapons; U.S. losses were seven killed. At 03:30 a landing zone 1 mile (1.6 km) west of Sông Bé occupied by a unit of the 1st Brigade, 1st Infantry Division was attacked. The battle continued until 07:00 when the enemy withdrew leaving 33 dead and two flamethrowers. At 08:50 a helicopter from the 12th Combat Aviation Group received ground fire 5 miles (8.0 km) west-southwest of Xuân Lộc and returned fire and observed 10 dead in the strike area. At 09:20 another helicopter from the same unit engaged enemy 8 miles (13 km) northeast of Xuân Lộc killing eight. At 10:30 mechanized infantry from the 3rd Brigade, 9th Infantry Division engaged an estimated enemy battalion 4 miles (6.4 km) northwest of Tân An. The unit was supported by artillery, helicopter gunships and tactical air strikes and the ARVN 50th Regiment, 25th Division. The battle continued until morning when the enemy withdrew leaving 83 dead, seven light machineguns, six AK-47s and five RPG launchers; U.S. losses were two killed. In the Rung Sat Special Zone VC attacked five ships on the Long Tau channel causing superficial damage. An AH-1 was shot down 13 miles (21 km) west of An Lộc.

On 13 May at 10:00 a unit of the 2nd Brigade, 25th Infantry Division sweeping an area 9 miles (14 km) northeast of Trảng Bàng engaged an entrenched enemy force. The enemy withdrew at 14:15 leaving 50 dead and 18 individual and eight crew-served weapons; U.S. losses were three killed. On 14 May at 04:45 mechanized infantry from the 1st Brigade, 25th Infantry Division in a night defensive position 4 miles (6.4 km) northwest of Dầu Tiếng received mortar fire followed by a ground attack. The battle continued until 06:00 when the PAVN withdrew leaving 51 dead and four captured and 17 individual and six crew-served weapons; U.S. losses were two killed. At 12:10 an infantry unit from the 2nd Brigade, 25th Infantry Division sweeping an area 10 miles (16 km) west of Bến Cát was attacked by PAVN. The unit received support from mechanized infantry, artillery and helicopter gunships killing 34 PAVN and capturing 13 AK-47s and three RPG launchers. At 13:10 a unit of the 1st Brigade, 25th Infantry Division engaged four PAVN 11 miles (18 km) north of Ben Soi, contact was lost then regained at 15:00 before the PAVN broke contact at 15:25 leaving 23 dead and five individual weapons; U.S. losses were two killed. At 13:45 helicopters from the air cavalry unit of the 25th Infantry Division engaged 15 enemy 5 miles (8.0 km) west-southwest of Bến Cát, the bodies of 12 PAVN/VC were found and four captured. At 16:30 a unit of the 3rd Brigade, 9th Infantry Division sweeping an area 2 miles (3.2 km) southeast of Bến Lức engaged an enemy force. Contact was lost at 17:35 with 13 PAVN/VC killed.

On 15 May at 07:00 a unit of the 3rd Brigade, 9th Infantry Division sweeping an area 3 miles (4.8 km) southeast of Bến Lức engaged an enemy force killing 13 and capturing six individual weapons. At 09:50 a unit of the 11th ACR engaged an enemy force 6 miles (9.7 km) southeast of Dầu Tiếng, the engagement continued until 12:15 resulting in 12 PAVN/VC killed and one RPG launcher captured. At 15:10 a base occupied by the 1st Brigade, 25th Infantry Division 1 mile (1.6 km) east of the Cambodian border received mortar fire, artillery fire was directed onto the firing position and a sweep of the area found 11 PAVN dead. An AH-1 was shot down 6 miles (9.7 km) southeast of Tây Ninh killing one crewman. At 15:30 an OH-6 was shot down 7 miles (11 km) southwest of An Lộc killing one crewman.

On 16 May at 09:50 a unit of the 1st Brigade, 1st Infantry Division patrolling 7 miles (11 km) southeast of Dầu Tiếng found the bodies of nine PAVN, three AK-47s and an 82 mm mortar. At 09:55 a unit of the 3rd Brigade, 25th Infantry division sweeping an area 10 miles (16 km) southeast of Phú Cường found 20 bunkers containing 10 enemy bodies killed by airstrikes in the preceding days. At 10:30 armored cavalry of the 25th Infantry Division patrolling 6 miles (9.7 km) northeast of Trảng Bàng found a 9-ton rice cache. At 13:20 units of the 3rd Brigade, 82nd Airborne Division operating 11 miles (18 km) southwest of Bến Cát engaged a PAVN force killing 38 and capturing 14 individual and four crew-served weapons.

On 17 May at 21:15 a unit of the 1st Brigade, 1st Cavalry Division engaged an enemy unit 12 miles (19 km) north of Tây Ninh killing seven and capturing two and three 107 mm rockets. On 18 May at 01:00 a unit of the 54th Artillery Group at Xuân Lộc Base Camp was attacked. The unit was supported by helicopter and fixed wing gunships and a unit of the 11th ACR. Fighting continued until 06:00 resulting in 24 PAVN killed and 14 U.S. killed. At 11:20 infantry from the 199th Light Infantry Brigade (199th LIB) located a weapons cache 3 miles (4.8 km) northwest of Bình Chánh District. At 12:35 armored cavalry from the 25th Infantry Division engaged an enemy force 5 miles (8.0 km) north-northeast of Trảng Bàng, supporting arms were called in and the action continued until 17:15 when the enemy withdrew leaving 14 dead and one AK-47 and one RPG launcher. At 12:45 in the same general area infantry from the 2nd Brigade, 25th Infantry Division engaged an enemy force in a battle that continued until 17:50 resulting in 14 PAVN/VC killed and four AK-47s captured. At 13:15 Dầu Tiếng Base Camp received 10 rounds of 82 mm mortar fire and artillery fire was directed onto the firing position, a later search found two dead PAVN/VC. A UH-1 was hit by ground fire and crashed 2 miles (3.2 km) north of Tây Ninh.

On 19 May at 10:45 a unit of the 1st Brigade, 1st Cavalry Division engaged an enemy force 4 miles (6.4 km) southeast of Phú Cường losing three killed while killing two PAVN/VC. At midday the armored cavalry squadron of the 25th Infantry Division patrolling 5 miles (8.0 km) north of Trảng Bàng found the bodies of 12 PAVN/VC killed by airstrikes in the previous two days. At 16:40 armor from the 25th Infantry Division engaged an enemy force 7 miles (11 km) southwest of Bến Cát killing 15 PAVN/VC and capturing six AK-47s and two RPG launchers. On 20 May at 11:10 mechanized infantry of the 3rd Brigade, 9th Infantry Division engaged an enemy force 9 miles (14 km) southeast of Tân An killing 14 PAVN/VC and capturing four individual weapons. AT 11:30 a UH-1 was shot down 12 miles (19 km) northeast of Phú Cường. At 14:20 a unit of the 3rd Brigade, 82nd Airborne Division sweeping and area 6 miles (9.7 km) northeast of Trảng Bàng engaged an enemy force. The contact continued until 18:00 and resulted in 16 PAVN/VC killed and seven individual weapons captured. At 16:00 infantry from the 3rd Brigade, 9th Infantry Division engaged an enemy force 6 miles southwest of Rach Kien killing 12 PAVN/VC and capturing two individual weapons.

On 21 May at 01:00 a unit of the 1st Brigade, 1st Cavalry Division in a night defensive position 11 miles (18 km) south of Katum observed 10-15 enemy infiltrating their perimeter wire and engaged them with organics weapons, artillery and helicopter and fixed-wing gunship fire killing 12 PAVN and capturing one and six individual and two crew-served weapons. At 11:15 mechanized infantry of the 2nd Brigade, 1st Infantry Division engaged 15–20 enemy in bunkers 2 miles (3.2 km) northwest of Củ Chi, artillery and air support were called in and the bodies of 17 PAVN/VC and six individual and one crew-served weapons were found. At 14:35 a UH-1 was shot down 0.6 miles (0.97 km) east of Đức Hòa District. On 22 May at 04:15 an AH-1 was shot down 11 miles (18 km) north of Xuân Lộc killing both crewmen. An OH-6 was hit by ground fire 4 miles (6.4 km) south of Trảng Bàng. On 23 May at 04:45 an RF outpost 4 miles (6.4 km) southwest of An Lộc received 100 rounds of 60/82 mm mortar fire followed by a ground assault. The unit was reinforced by another RF unit and at 09:30 by mechanized infantry from the 1st Brigade, 1st Infantry Division. The PAVN withdrew at 15:00 leaving 53 dead, two individual weapons, 2 12.7mm machineguns and one 57 mm recoilless rifle; U.S. losses were two killed, there were no ARVN losses. At 13:00 mechanized infantry from the 1st Brigade, 25th Infantry Division patrolling 10 miles (16 km) southeast of Tây Ninh found the graves of 15 PAVN killed approximately two days earlier.

On 24 May at 09:07 a unit of the 11th ACR engaged an enemy force 4 miles (6.4 km) east-northeast of Bearcat Base. The contact continued until 18:00 resulting in 15 PAVN/VC killed and two 12.7mm machineguns, two 82 mm mortars and one RPG launcher captured; U.S. losses were one killed. At 12:45 the 1/9th Cavalry engaged a bunker complex 14 miles (23 km) southeast of Katum killing two PAVN and capturing a 40-ton rice cache. At 13:10 a unit of the 3rd Brigade, 1st Infantry Division engaged an enemy force 11 miles (18 km) north of Bến Cát. Contact was lost at 18:50 with 14 PAVN/VC killed and one AK-47 captured; U.S. losses were one killed. At 14:20 a unit of the 2nd Brigade, 25th Infantry Division engaged an enemy force 4 miles (6.4 km) northeast of Trảng Bàng killing nine PAVN/VC and capturing four individual and one crew-served weapons. At 15:15 a unit of the 1st Brigade, 1st Infantry Division engaged an enemy unit 5 miles (8.0 km) west-southwest of An Lộc. Mechanized infantry joined the contact which continued until 16:40. A search of the area found 96 PAVN dead and captured one and 24 AK-47s, one light machinegun, three 75 mm recoilless rifles, two 57 mm recoilless rifles and two 60 mm mortars; U.S. losses were two killed. Staff Sergeant James Leroy Bondsteel was awarded the medal of Honor for destroying ten PAVN bunkers during the battle. At 15:25 units of the 2nd Brigade, 1st Cavalry Division located a bunker complex 15 miles (24 km) south-southeast of Katum containing 103 107 mm rockets, 124 RPG rounds and 12.5 tons of rice. At 21:40 a unit of the 1st Brigade, 25th Infantry Division at a firebase 6 miles (9.7 km) northwest of Ben Soi observed enemy movement on their perimeter. Artillery and helicopter and fixed-wing gunship fire was directed onto the area and the bodies of 20 PAVN/VC were found in the strike area.

On 25 May at 13:30 mechanized infantry of the 1st Brigade, 1st Infantry Division engaged an enemy force 5 miles (8.0 km) west-southwest of An Lộc killing 29 PAVN for losses of two U.S. killed. At 12:10 a UH-1 was hit by ground fire 6 miles (9.7 km) west of Lai Khê. At 15:20 a unit of the 2nd Brigade, 1st Cavalry Division sweeping an area 15 miles (24 km) southeast of Katum engaged an entrenched enemy force killing eight. A search of the bunker complex found 148 107/122 mm rockets, 68 tons of rice and 10 tons of salt. On 26 May at 13:45 mechanized infantry of the 2nd Brigade, 25th Infantry Division operating with RF forces sweeping an area 2.5 miles (4.0 km) northwest of Củ Chi engaged an enemy force killing 16 PAVN/VC and capturing 11 individual and two crew-served weapons. At 19:45 an OH-6 was shot down 7 miles (11 km) east of Dầu Tiếng.

On 27 May at 08:15 a unit of the 1st Brigade, 1st Infantry Division air assaulted into a landing zone 2 miles (3.2 km) northwest of Sông Bé and were immediately engaged by enemy forces. Mechanized infantry later arrived and the enemy withdrew at 11:20 with unknown losses; U.S. losses were one killed. At 10:00 a unit of the U.S. Navy River Detachment 512 operating on canals 12 miles (19 km) southwest of Củ Chi found a 2-ton munitions cache hidden in 55 gallon drums. At 17:30 a unit of the 3rd Brigade, 9th Infantry Division sweeping an area 6 miles (9.7 km) north-northwest of Tân An engaged an enemy force killing 20 PAVN/VC and capturing eight AK-47s; U.S. losses were three killed. An OH-6 was shot down in Hậu Nghĩa Province. On 28 May at 10:30 a unit of the 11th ACR sweeping an area 9 miles (14 km) southeast of Xuân Lộc engaged an entrenched enemy force. The ARVN 52nd Regiment, 18th Division reinforced and the battle continued until 16:00 resulting in 18 PAVN/VC killed and four individual weapons captured; U.S. losses were one killed, there no ARVN losses. At 12:35 a reconnaissance unit from the 3rd Brigade, 9th Infantry Division engaged an enemy force 8 miles (13 km) north-northeast of Tân An, the battle continued until 19:00 resulting in 23 PAVN/VC killed and five U.S. killed.

On 29 May at 06:00 helicopter gunships from the 3rd Brigade, 25th Infantry Division engaged 10–15 enemy soldiers 8 miles (13 km) northeast of Trảng Bàng, division mechanized infantry then swept the area engaging more enemy until 18:00. The PAVN/VC lost 59 killed and 30 AK-47s and 13 crew-served weapons were captured; U.S. losses were one killed. At 08:30 1/9th Cavalry found a 22-ton food cache 21 miles (34 km) north-northeast of Xuân Lộc. Later that day the same unit found a munitions in the same area. At 10:10 an OH-6 from the 12th Combat Aviation Group received fire from a bunker complex 10 miles (16 km) southwest of Bến Cát and directed artillery and helicopter gunship fire onto the area killing five PAVN/VC. At 12:45 a unit of the 11th ACR patrolling 9 miles (14 km) southeast of Xuân Lộc found a weapons cache containing 27 SKS rifles, nine M3 submachine guns, eight BARs and assorted other weapons and munitions. At 14:45 a unit of the 11th ACR engaged an entrenched enemy force 9 miles southeast of Xuân Lộc and killed 21 PAVN/VC and captured one. At 20:45 infantry from the 3rd Brigade, 9th Infantry Division engaged an enemy force 3 miles (4.8 km) northwest of Cần Đước killing nine. On 30 May at 00:05 a unit of the 3rd Brigade, 82nd Airborne Division in a night defensive position 2.5 miles (4.0 km) northeast of Hóc Môn District was attacked and lost eight killed. On 31 May at 10:15 a unit of the 3rd Brigade, 25th Infantry Division sweeping an area 6 miles southeast of Bến Cát engaged a PAVN force killing 14 and capturing nine individual and one crew-served weapons.

Cumulative operational results to the end of May were 13,959 PAVN/VC killed, 1,992 captured and 3,739 individual and 1004 crew-served weapons captured. U.S. losses were 894 killed.

=== June ===
On 1 June at 12:25 the air cavalry squadron of the 12th Combat Aviation Group engaged an enemy force 8 miles (13 km) north of Củ Chi, the enemy withdrew at 13:00 leaving 15 dead and 11 individual weapons; U.S. losses were one killed. On 2 June at 08:55 1/9th Cavalry engaged an entrenched PAVN company 9 miles (14 km) southeast of Dong Bo. Supporting arms were called in and the enemy eventually withdrew at 17:45 leaving 29 dead; U.S. losses were two killed, including First lieutenant Robert Leslie Poxon who was later posthumously awarded the Medal of Honor. At 10:15 infantry from the 3rd Brigade, 1st Infantry Division found a 10-ton rice cache 7 miles (11 km) southeast of Dầu Tiếng. At 15:50 a unit of the 2nd Brigade, 1st Cavalry Division engaged 15 PAVN 20 miles (32 km) southwest of An Lộc, the enemy withdrew at 16:55 leaving one dead while U.S. losses were two killed.

On 3 June at 09:30 helicopters from the 12th Combat Aviation Group engaged an enemy force 2 miles (3.2 km) south-southeast of Phú Cường killing 14. At 11:15 a unit of the 11th ACR engaged an enemy force 5 miles (8.0 km) southwest of An Lộc killing 21 PAVN/VC and capturing ten and two individual and three crew-served weapons. At 14:30 a unit of the 3rd Brigade, 1st Cavalry Division found an 8.5 ton food cache 6 miles (9.7 km) east of Dong Bo. At 16:50 another 11th ACR unit engaged a PAVN force 1 mile (1.6 km) southwest of the earlier action killing 22 and capturing five individual and two crew-served weapons. At 17:15 the 1/9th Cavalry observed 26 dead PAVN 6 miles southeast of Phú Cường killed by airstrikes earlier that day. A UH-1 was shot down 1 mile northwest of Phước Vĩnh killing all seven on board.

On 4 June at 12:50 units of the 199th LIB engaged an enemy force 6 miles (9.7 km) southeast of Cần Giuộc District killing eight. On 5 June at 12:50 a unit of the 2nd Brigade, 25th Infantry Division and a unit of the ARVN 49th Regiment, 25th Division engaged a PAVN force 6 miles northeast of Trảng Bàng in an engagement that continued until the evening. PAVN losses were 72 killed and 21 individual and four crew-served weapons captured. At 15:30 a unit of the 1st Brigade, 1st Cavalry Division found the graves of 20 PAVN/VC 14 miles (23 km) east of Tây Ninh killed in air or artillery strikes in the preceding days. At 17:10 a reconnaissance unit of the 25th Infantry Division observed a PAVN platoon 3 miles (4.8 km) south of Go Dau Ha and directed artillery and helicopter gunship fire onto the area. An RF unit was landed by U.S. Navy riverine boats and engaged the PAVN killing 15 for no losses. An OH-6 was shot down 9 miles (14 km) south of Tây Ninh. A UH-1 was shot down 5 miles (8.0 km) northeast of Trảng Bàng killing four on board.

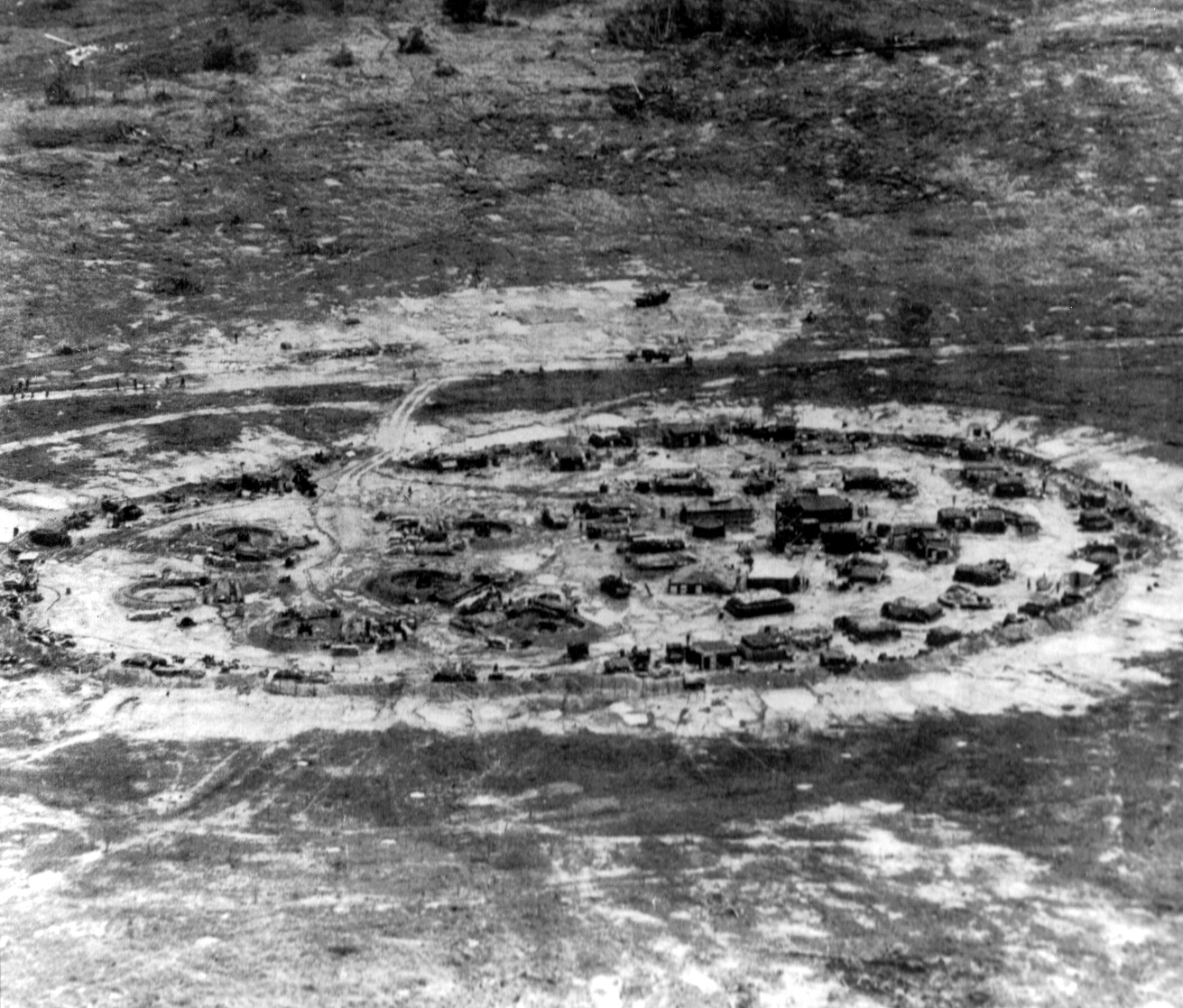
Firebase Crook in June 1969

On the night of 5/6 June PAVN/VC forces conducted attacks by fire and ground attacks on numerous bases throughout II Corps and III Corps. On the night of 5 June, sensors at Firebase Crook 18 km northwest of Tây Ninh detected movements outside the base wire. The base was occupied by the 3rd Battalion, 22nd Infantry Regiment and the 7th Battalion, 11th Field Artillery Regiment. A rocket attack on the base of the 199th LIB 5 miles (8.0 km) east of Biên Hòa killed one Scout dog and 12 civilians in a village near the base. Artillery fire was directed onto the firing position and a search of the area found three dead PAVN/VC. Following a mortar attack on a base of the 1st Brigade, 1st Infantry Division 4 miles (6.4 km) south of An Lộc, artillery was directed onto the firing position and a search of the area found 18 dead PAVN/VC. At 00:40 the base camp of the 1st Brigade, 1st Infantry Division 3 miles (4.8 km) northeast of An Lộc was attacked. The attackers withdrew at 06:10 leaving 14 dead and five captured. At 01:45 a landing zone occupied by the 2nd Brigade, 1st Cavalry Division 22 miles (35 km) northeast of Tây Ninh received 15 rounds of 82 mm mortar fire followed by a ground attack. The battle continued until 05:30 when the enemy withdrew leaving eight dead and one AK-47; U.S. losses were one killed. At 02:50 a mechanized infantry unit of the 3rd Brigade, 25th Infantry Division in a night defensive position 12 miles (19 km) southeast of Tây Ninh was attacked. The attackers withdrew at 04:00 leaving seven dead and three captured and five individual weapons and 15 RPG rounds; U.S. losses were two killed. At 03:00 PAVN mortar fire hit Firebase Crook followed by an assault on the southern and eastern perimeters by elements of the PAVN 272nd Regiment with 16 managing to penetrate the perimeter before being forced out. AC-47 and AC-119 gunships were called in and forced the attackers to retreat. At 09:30 mechanized infantry of the 3rd Brigade, 25th Infantry Division engaged an enemy force 9 miles (14 km) southeast of Tây Ninh, the enemy withdrew at 13:30 leaving 17 dead and two individual weapons and a 60 mm mortar. At 10:55 mechanized infantry from the 1st Brigade, 1st Infantry Division engaged an entrenched enemy company 3 miles northwest of An Lộc. Supporting arms and more mechanized infantry joined the battle which continued until 15:00 when the enemy withdrew leaving 115 dead and nine captured and 26 individual and ten crew-served weapons; U.S. losses were three killed. At 13:10 unit of the 11th ACR providing security for an ARVN convoy on Highway 13 was attacked 11 miles (18 km) south of An Lộc. The unit was joined by mechanized infantry of the 3rd Brigade, 1st Infantry Division and the enemy withdrew at 14:40 leaving 49 dead and one captured. At 17:05 a unit of the 1st Brigade, 1st Cavalry Division engaged an enemy force 6 miles (9.7 km) southeast of Phú Cường, the enemy withdrew at 19:30 leaving 44 dead and five individual weapons. An OH-6 was shot down 17 miles (27 km) southeast of Tây Ninh. A UH-1 was shot down 19 miles (31 km) north of Phú Cường killing all four on board.

At 02:00 on 7 June a Night Hawk helicopter detected movement near Firebase Crook and artillery fire was directed against the suspected PAVN positions. At 03:00 a PAVN rocket and artillery barrage began to hit the base and then at 04:30 two battalions of the PAVN 88th Regiment attacked the northern perimeter but were forced back by gunship fire. PAVN losses in this attack were 323 killed without loss among U.S. forces. At 09:30 a unit of the 11th ACR and the ARVN 2nd Squadron, 5th Cavalry engaged an enemy company 11 miles (18 km) east-southeast of Xuân Lộc. Artillery, helicopter gunships and airstrikes were provided in support and the enemy withdrew at 16:45 leaving 41 dead and seven individual and seven crew-served weapons; U.S. losses were two killed. At 10:45 mechanized infantry from the 1st Brigade, 1st Infantry Division and a unit of the 11th ACR engaged two PAVN companies 4 miles (6.4 km) southwest of An Lộc. The units were reinforced by another 11th ACR unit and artillery, helicopter gunships and airstrikes were provided in support. The PAVN withdrew at 16:30 leaving 95 dead and 22 AK-47s, five RPG-2s, four RPG-7s, one 60 mm mortar and one 57 mm recoilless rifle; U.S. losses were three killed. At 14:00 a unit of the 1st Brigade, 1st Cavalry Division found 16 PAVN dead 9 miles (14 km) northeast of Phú Cường who had been killed in airstrikes the previous day. At 14:20 mechanized infantry from the 1st Brigade, 25th Infantry Division engaged an enemy force 2 miles (3.2 km) northeast of Tây Ninh killing 19 and capturing five and two individual weapons.

On the night of 7/8 June a third weak assault was made against Firebase Crook and quickly repulsed. On 8 June at 17:05 infantry and mechanized infantry from the 2nd Brigade, 25th Infantry Division engaged an enemy force 5 miles (8.0 km) northeast of Trảng Bàng killing 17 and capturing seven individual and one crew-served weapons. At 21:15 helicopter gunships of the 164th Combat Aviation Group engaged an enemy force 4 miles (6.4 km) southeast of Phú Cường, forty dead PAVN/VC were counted in the strike area. On 9 June at 10:40 a mechanized unit of the 1st Brigade, 1st Infantry Division engaged an enemy force 3 miles (4.8 km) east of An Lộc. Artillery, helicopter gunships and airstrikes were provided in support and the enemy withdrew at 16:15 leaving 36 dead and three individual and one crew-served weapons; U.S. losses were one killed. At 13:30 a unit of the 11th ACR engaged an enemy force 5 miles northwest of An Lộc. The unit was supported by helicopter gunships and joined by mechanized infantry from the 1st Brigade, 1st Infantry Division. The enemy withdrew at 16:30 leaving nine dead and five individual and one crew-served weapons; U.S. losses were four killed. At 14:15 a unit of the 1st Brigade, 1st Cavalry Division engaged an entrenched enemy force 14 miles (23 km) east of Tây Ninh. The unit was reinforced by other brigade troopers and a unit of the 11th ACR. The enemy withdrew at 18:20 leaving 15 dead; U.S. losses were three killed. At 14:50 mechanized infantry from the 1st Brigade, 25th Infantry Division engaged an enemy force 11 miles (18 km) east of Tây Ninh. Artillery and helicopter and fixed-wing gunships were provided in support and the enemy withdrew at 19:00 leaving 51 dead; U.S. losses were three killed. At 15:10 armored cavalry from the 25th Infantry Division engaged an enemy force 3 miles north of Trảng Bàng. Another unit of the squadron joined the action and artillery, helicopter gunships and airstrikes were provided in support. The enemy withdrew at 19:00 leaving 26 dead and seven individual weapons.

On 10 June between 10:15 and 17:00 units of the 3rd Brigade, 1st Cavalry Division located food and material caches 20 miles (32 km) northeast of Xuân Lộc. At 12:40 a unit of the 1st Brigade, 1st Cavalry Division found the bodies of 12 PAVN 8 miles (13 km) southeast of Phú Cường killed by small arms fire two days previously. An AH-1 was shot down 12 miles (19 km) north of Phú Cường. On 11 June at 08:55 unit of the 3rd Brigade, 25th Infantry Division engaged an enemy force 8 miles southeast of Phú Cường. The enemy withdrew at 09:30 but the brigade unit joined by mechanized infantry pursued and reengaged at 12:30 supported by artillery, helicopter gunships and airstrikes. At 19:15 the enemy withdrew leaving 56 dead and three capture and four individual and three crew-served weapons; U.S. losses were two killed.

On 12 June at 02:00 a unit of the 3rd Brigade, 1st Cavalry Division in a night defensive position 18 miles (29 km) northeast of Xuân Lộc was attacked by a PAVN force. The attackers withdrew at 04:55 leaving 35 dead and two captured and 22 individual weapons. Prisoner interrogation revealed that the attackers were from the VC 27th Regiment, 5th Division. At 13:00 a unit of the 1st Infantry Division sweeping 6 miles (9.7 km) west of Lai Khê captured one PAVN soldier. At 18:35 1/9th Cavalry helicopters engaged an enemy force 9 miles (14 km) southeast of Katum killing 15. On 13 June at 01:25 mechanized infantry of the 3rd Brigade, 25th Infantry Division in night defensive positions 7 miles (11 km) southeast of Phú Cường were attacked. The enemy withdrew at dawn but were pursued by the U.S. unit who lost contact at 08:50. Nine PAVN/VC were killed and five individual and two crew-served weapons captured. At 13:30 a unit of the 2nd Brigade, 25th infantry Division engaged an enemy force 5 miles (8.0 km) northwest of Trảng Bàng. Artillery, helicopter gunships and airstrikes were provided in support until the enemy withdrew at 14:40 leaving 23 dead and nine individual and three crew-served weapons. Also at 13:30 a unit from the 1st Brigade, 1st Cavalry Division engaged an enemy force 8 miles (13 km) northeast of Phú Cường killing eight. At 21:20 mechanized infantry of the 2nd Brigade, 25th Infantry Division ambushed an enemy force 3 miles (4.8 km) northwest of Củ Chi. The enemy withdrew at 21:55 leaving 16 dead and three individual weapons. At 21:45 a unit of the 3rd Brigade, 9th Infantry Division engaged 20 enemy soldiers 4 miles (6.4 km) south of Tân An killing 13 and capturing two individual weapons. A UH-1 was shot down 3 miles northwest of Củ Chi.

On 14 June at midday a unit of the 2nd Brigade, 1st Cavalry Division found an arms cache in a bunker complex 10 miles (16 km) northeast of Phú Cường containing 71 carbines, three light machineguns, a 75 mm recoilless rifle, nine 81 mm mortars and assorted other munitions. On 15 June at 09:35 the armored cavalry squadron of the 25th Infantry Division engaged an enemy force 3 miles (4.8 km) north of Trảng Bàng, the squadron was supported by artillery, helicopter gunships and airstrikes. The enemy withdrew at 18:15 leaving 40 dead and two individual and five crew-served weapons; U.S. losses were one killed. At 18:45 an OH-6 of 1/9th Cavalry engaged ten enemy soldiers 11 miles (18 km) north of Tây Ninh and called in artillery fire on the location, following the strike eight bodies were counted. An AH-1 was shot down 17 miles (27 km) north of Xuân Lộc.

On 16 June at 01:30 helicopter gunships from the 1/9th Cavalry attacked an enemy campsite, 12 bodies were later seen in the area. At 14:30 armored cavalry from the 25th Infantry Division found 13 PAVN bodies 1 mile (1.6 km) northwest of Trảng Bàng, they appeared to have been killed two days previously. At 15:45 reconnaissance troops from the 1st Infantry Division engaged an enemy force 20 miles (32 km) south-southeast of An Lộc killing ten. At 16:30 a unit of the 2nd Brigade, 1st Cavalry Division found a munitions cache 20 miles (32 km) south-southeast of An Lộc containing 16 107mm and five 122 mm rockets. At 17:45 a unit of the 3rd Brigade, 1st Cavalry Division engaged an enemy force 12 miles (19 km) northeast of Xuân Lộc. Artillery and helicopter gunship support was provided and the enemy withdrew at 18:50 leaving 9 dead; U.S. losses were one killed and one Kit Carson Scout killed. On 17 June at 05:55 a unit of the 3rd Brigade, 1st Cavalry Division in a night defensive position 17 miles (27 km) north of Xuân Lộc was attacked by a PAVN force. The PAVN withdrew at 07:05 leaving nine dead and two individual and one crew-served weapons. At 10:15 a unit of the 2nd Brigade, 1st Cavalry Division found a weapons cache 20 miles (32 km) southwest of An Lộc containing five 240 mm rockets. At 16:30 helicopters carrying a unit of the 2nd Brigade, 25th Infantry Division received heavy ground fire near a landing zone 8 miles (13 km) northeast of Trảng Bàng. Helicopter gunships and airstrikes hit the area and the troops were landed and searched the area finding 32 PAVN/VC dead and six individual and seven crew-served weapons.

On 18 June at 01:45 a PAVN unit from the 1st Division attacked a 1st Brigade, 1st Cavalry Division night defensive position 12 miles (19 km) south of Katum. The defenders were supported by helicopter gunship and AC-47 fire and the PAVN withdrew at 03:30 leaving 37 dead and three captured and 11 individual and three crew-served weapons; U.S. losses were three killed. At 07:50 a unit of the 11th ACR and Civilian Irregular Defense Group (CIDG) forces engaged a unit of the PAVN 7th Division 3 miles (4.8 km) southwest of An Lộc. Other U.S. units joined the battle and helicopter gunships and airstrikes were given in support and the PAVN withdrew at 11:30 leaving 31 dead and three individual and five crew-served weapons. A UH-1 was shot down 3 miles northwest of An Lộc killing two on board

On 19 June at 01:45 a unit of the 1st Brigade, 25th Infantry Division at a firebase 6 miles (9.7 km) northwest of Tây Ninh engaged six enemy soldiers outside the perimeter. At 02:20 a barrage of mortar and RPG fire hit the base followed by an attack by fire. The defenders fought back supported by artillery and AC-47 and AC-119 fire. The attackers withdrew at 04:00 leaving 35 dead and six captured and 13 individual and eight crew-served weapons. At 09:50 the armored cavalry squadron of the 25th Infantry Division engaged an enemy force 5 miles (8.0 km) southeast of Tây Ninh supported by artillery and helicopter gunships and later reinforced by another armored cavalry unit. The enemy withdrew at 20:30 leaving 85 dead; U.S. losses were two killed. At 11:50 a unit of the 1st Brigade, 25th Infantry Division and the South Vietnamese 6th Marine Battalion engaged an enemy company 4 miles (6.4 km) southwest of Tây Ninh, supported by artillery and airstrikes. The enemy withdrew at 13:20 leaving 57 dead and three individual and 12 crew-served weapons. At 17:35 mechanized infantry of the 1st Brigade, 25th Infantry Division attack an enemy force on the northeast of Tây Ninh. The enemy withdrew at 18:00 leaving 18 dead and three AK-47s and one 2mm mortar. At 22:15 helicopters from the 12th Combat Aviation Group attacked an enemy force 6 miles southwest of Tây Ninh killing 15. A UH-1 was shot down 5 miles (8.0 km) south of Xuân Lộc.

On 20 June at 00:50 a landing zone occupied by a unit of the 1st Brigade, 1st Cavalry Division 12 miles (19 km) south of Katum received 82 mm mortar and 107 mm rocket fire. At 01:30 the base was attacked by a reinforced PAVN battalion of the 1st Division. The defenders fought back supported by artillery and AC-47 fire. The PAVN withdrew at 02:45 leaving 90 dead and 33 individual and 21 crew-served weapons; U.S. losses were seven killed. At 10:45 a unit of the 2nd Brigade, 25th Infantry Division patrolling 2 miles (3.2 km) northeast of Trảng Bàng engaged an enemy force killing 12 and capturing three individual and one crew-served weapons. On 21 June at 09:00 a unit of the 1st Brigade, 1st Cavalry Division engaged an enemy force 8 miles (13 km) south of Katum killing 14 and capturing three individual and two crew-served weapons. At 19:25 a unit of the 25th Infantry Division in night defensive positions 9 miles (14 km) northwest of Go Dau Ha directed 81 mm mortar fire onto seven PAVN/VC killing all seven. On 22 June at 21:00 a unit of the 2nd Brigade, 25th Infantry Division engaged an enemy force 6 miles (9.7 km) northwest of Củ Chi. The unit was reinforced by mechanized infantry and supported by helicopter gunship and AC-47 fire. The enemy withdrew at 23:00 leaving 29 dead and two captured and 15 individual and one crew-served weapon; U.S. losses were one killed.

On 23 June at 12:15 a unit of the 25th Infantry Division found the bodies of 23 PAVN 5 miles (8.0 km) northeast of Trảng Bàng, all had been killed recently by artillery fire. At 13:35 armored cavalry of the 25th Infantry Division found the graves of 12 PAVN/VC 3 miles (4.8 km) north of Trảng Bàng that had been killed by artillery fire. At 15:45 helicopters of the 12th Combat Aviation Group attacked an enemy force 10 miles (16 km) southeast of Tân An killing 14. At 17:45 the 1/9th Cavalry attacked an enemy force in bunkers 4 miles (6.4 km) north of An Lộc. Artillery fire was directed onto the complex and the enemy withdrew leaving 18 dead and two individual and three crew-served weapons. A USAF C-130 was shot down while on approach to Katum killing all six on board. A UH-1 was shot down 2 miles (3.2 km) west of Katum.

On 24 June at 14:55 mechanized infantry of the 3rd Brigade, 25th Infantry Division found the graves of eight PAVN/VC 7 miles (11 km) northeast of Go Dau Ha, all had been killed recently by artillery fire. At 20:30 a unit of the 3rd Brigade, 82nd Airborne Division attacked ten enemy in a sampan 6 miles (9.7 km) northwest of Bến Lức killing nine. An OH-6 was shot down in Hậu Nghĩa Province killing both crewmen. On 25 June at 08:30 the 1/9th Cavalry engaged 20–5 entrenched enemy soldiers 7 miles southeast of Phước Vĩnh, the aerorifle platoon was landed and found 13 dead and two individual weapons. At 16:00 a unit of the 2nd Brigade, 25th Infantry Division patrolling 9 miles (14 km) southwest of Bến Cát found the bodies of ten PAVN/VC killed by airstrikes. On 26 June a USAF FAC saw nine enemy dead and seven destroyed bunkers in an area hit by airstrikes 9 miles southwest of Bến Cát. At 17:30 an observation helicopter drew fire 5 miles (8.0 km) northwest of Tây Ninh, artillery fire was directed onto the area and then mechanized infantry of the 1st Brigade, 25th Infantry Division swept the area finding 23 dead.

On 27 June at 05:00 mechanized infantry of the 1st Brigade, 25th Infantry Division in night defensive positions 8 miles (13 km) northeast of Tây Ninh received a ground probe by an enemy force. Artillery, helicopter gunships and an AC-47 provided supporting fire and the enemy withdrew at 06:30 leaving 32 dead and three captured and two RPG launchers; one Kit Carson Scout was killed. At 08:45 mechanized infantry from the 1st Brigade, 25th Infantry Division engaged an enemy force 6 miles (9.7 km) northeast of Tây Ninh, supported by artillery, helicopter gunships and airstrikes. The enemy withdrew at 14:30 leaving 62 dead and 23 AK-47s and two crew-served weapons; U.S. losses were one killed. At 10:55 a unit of the 2nd Brigade, 25th Infantry Division engaged an enemy force 3 miles (4.8 km) northwest of Phú Cường. The unit was reinforced by mechanized infantry and an RF unit with artillery and helicopter gunship support. The enemy withdrew at 13:35 leaving 39 dead, 15 AK-47s and two RPG-2 launchers and 100 RPG-2 grenades; U.S. losses were four killed including Staff sergeant Hammett L. Bowen Jr. who smothered the blast of a hand grenade with his body, an action for which he was posthumously awarded the Medal of Honor. At 12:35 mechanized infantry of the 3rd Brigade, 25th Infantry Division engaged and enemy platoon in Long An Province killing 24 and capturing six individual weapons; U.S. losses were three killed. On 28 June at 10:45 a unit of the 2nd Brigade, 1st Cavalry Division found 54 dead PAVN/VC 18 miles (29 km) south-southwest of An Lộc who had apparently been killed by artillery fire a month earlier. At 13:55 mechanized infantry of the 1st Brigade, 25th Infantry Division engaged an enemy force 5 miles (8.0 km) northeast of Tây Ninh killing nine. At 19:05 an aerial observer directed artillery fire onto an enemy unit 5 miles northeast of Trảng Bàng killing 11 PAVN/VC. On 29 June at 14:00 a unit of the 1st Brigade, 25th Infantry Division found 11 PAVN/VC dead 3 miles (4.8 km) northwest of Tây Ninh all were recently killed by artillery fire.

Cumulative operational results to the end of June were 18,598 PAVN/VC killed, 2,434 captured and 4,869 individual and 1,310 crew-served weapons captured. U.S. losses were 1,122 killed.

=== July ===
On 1 July at 10:35 a unit of the 2nd Brigade, 25th Infantry Division found a 6-ton rice cache 9 miles (14 km) northeast of Trảng Bàng. At 10:40 mechanized infantry of the 1st Brigade, 25th Infantry Division engaged an enemy force 8 miles (13 km) northeast of Tây Ninh. Artillery, helicopter gunship and air support was provided and another mechanized infantry unit joined the battle. The enemy withdrew at 13:45 leaving 44 dead and 11 individual and one crew-served weapons; U.S. losses were one killed. At 23:30 a reconnaissance unit of the 3rd Brigade, 9th Infantry Division engaged 10–12 VC 11 miles (18 km) east of Tân An killing seven and capturing three AK-47s.

On 2 July at 07:25 a unit of the 2nd Brigade, 1st Cavalry Division engaged an entrenched enemy force 6 miles (9.7 km) east of Phú Cường. Artillery and air strikes were directed onto the enemy positions and the following day the troops searched the bunkers finding 32 PAVN/VC dead. At 08:00 mechanized infantry from the 1st Brigade, 25th Infantry Division found nine PAVN dead 7 miles (11 km) northeast of Tây Ninh apparently killed by small arms fire the previous day. Two OH-6's were shot down in Tây Ninh Province. At 17:00 a unit of the 11th ACR found an enemy tunnel complex 8 miles (13 km) southwest of Lai Khê, four PAVN/VC were captured and the bodies of 25 dead were found.

On 3 July at 11:40 a unit of the 199th LIB was attacked by an enemy force 12 miles (19 km) southwest of Xuân Lộc, supporting fire from artillery, helicopter gunship and airstrikes were called in. The enemy withdrew at 18:00 with unknown losses while U.S. losses were nine killed including Corporal Michael Fleming Folland who smothered the blast of a hand grenade with his body, an action for which he was posthumously awarded the Medal of Honor. At 12:35 a unit of the 3rd Brigade, 9th Infantry Division operating 5 miles (8.0 km) north of Bến Lức engaged an enemy platoon. Helicopter gunship, artillery and airstrikes were directed on the area and the enemy withdrew leaving 36 dead and four individual and two crew-served weapons; U.S. losses were three killed. At 16:30 a reconnaissance unit of the 1st Infantry Division engaged an enemy unit 8 miles (13 km) southeast of Bến Cát killing nine.

On 5 July helicopters from the 12th Combat Aviation Group engaged an enemy force 12 miles (19 km) northwest of Bến Lức killing 12 and capturing seven individual and one crew-served weapons. On 6 July at 02:45 helicopters of the 25th Infantry Division attacked 15 PAVN/VC 3 miles (4.8 km) southwest of Tây Ninh killing all 15. At 10:00 a unit of the 3rd Brigade, 1st Cavalry Division attacked an enemy force 9 miles (14 km) southeast of Dầu Tiếng killing 18. At 15:10 a unit of the 11th ACR engaged an enemy force 8 miles (13 km) southeast of Dầu Tiếng supported by artillery and helicopter gunships. The enemy withdrew at 17:00 leaving 19 dead and three individual weapons; U.S. losses were three killed. At 19:05 a firebase of the 2nd Brigade, 25th Infantry Division 3 miles (4.8 km) northeast of Trảng Bàng received75mm recoilless rifle fire. Mortar, artillery and helicopter gunship fire was directed onto the firing site and 11 PAVN/VC dead were observed at the site. An OH-6 was shot down 15 miles (24 km) northwest of Tây Ninh.

On 7 July at 07:50 a unit of the 11th ACR found the bodies of 13 PAVN/VC 6 miles (9.7 km) southwest of An Lộc they appeared to have been killed by artillery fire one month earlier. At 12:35 a unit of the 1st Brigade, 25th Infantry Division found the graves of nine PAVN/VC 8 miles (13 km) south of Tây Ninh, all had been killed by artillery in the preceding days. At 12:55 armored cavalry from the 25th Infantry Division found a seven-ton rice cache 2 miles (3.2 km) northwest of Trảng Bàng. At 18:45 a USAF observation aircraft drew fire 14 miles (23 km) west-northwest of Bến Tre, airstrikes were directed onto the position killing 17 PAVN/VC and destroying eight .50 cal machineguns. An OH-6 was shot down 2.5 miles (4.0 km) northwest of Lộc Ninh.

On 8 July at 10:45 a reconnaissance unit of the 3rd Brigade, 1st Infantry Division engaged an enemy force 9 miles (14 km) northwest of Lai Khê killing eight and capturing three individual weapons. At 11:55 helicopter gunships of the 12th Combat Aviation Group attacked an enemy force 4 miles (6.4 km) northwest of Củ Chi killing 13. At 14:00 a helicopter from the 25th Infantry Division drew ground fire 11 miles (18 km) west-northwest of Tây Ninh, artillery and airstrikes were directed onto the area killing seven PAVN/VC and destroying four 12.7mm machineguns. At 16:15 a Special Forces reconnaissance unit engaged an enemy force 17 miles (27 km) northeast of Biên Hòa killing eight; U.S. losses were one killed. At 16:40 a reconnaissance unit of the 1st Cavalry Division engaged an enemy force 9 miles (14 km) west-southwest of Sông Bé killing seven. A UH-1 was shot down in Bình Dương Province killing all four on board. At 17:25 a unit of the 3rd Brigade, 1st Infantry Division engaged a PAVN unit 4 miles (6.4 km) southeast of Dầu Tiếng killing ten and capturing one.

On 9 July at 10:00 a convoy from An Lộc to Quản Lợi was ambushed 4 miles (6.4 km) north of An Lộc by a unit of the PAVN 7th Division. Escorts from the 11th ACR engaged the attacked and were joined by other units of the regiment and supported by artillery, helicopter gunships and airstrikes. The PAVN withdrew at 16:00 leaving 22 dead and one captured; U.S. losses were four killed. At 17:50 a unit of the 2nd Brigade, 25th Infantry Division engaged an enemy force 9 miles (14 km) northeast of Trảng Bàng killing 17 and capturing three individual weapons.

On 10 July at 10:05 a unit of the 11th ACR engaged an enemy unit 3 miles (4.8 km) north-northeast of Lộc Ninh, the enemy withdrew at 10:55 leaving six dead and two RPG-7 launchers. At 10:17 a unit of the 2nd Brigade, 25th Infantry Division engaged an enemy force 4 miles (6.4 km) northeast of Trảng Bàng, a forward air controller directed artillery and helicopter gunships onto the enemy and a search of the area found ten dead and four individual and one crew-served weapons. At 10:40 an observation helicopter of the armored cavalry squadron of the 25th Infantry Division drew fire and directed artillery and helicopter gunship fire onto the area, ten enemy bodies were observed in the strike area. At 11:00 the 1/9th Cavalry engaged an enemy force 19 metres (62 ft) northwest of Sông Bé, artillery and airstrikes were directed onto the area and a sweep found 17 PAVN/VC dead. At 14:20 a unit of the 3rd Brigade, 9th Infantry Division air assaulted into a landing zone 17 miles (27 km) west of Đức Hòa and were met by small arms fire, other units reinforced and artillery and airstrikes were called in. The enemy withdrew at 20:00 leaving nine dead; U.S. losses were one killed. A prisoner captured in the fighting revealed under interrogation that some PAVN/VC forces were planning to revert to guerrilla and sapper tactics due to heavy losses incurred in recent operations.

On 11 July at 15:50 a unit of the 2nd Brigade, 1st Cavalry Division found the graves of eight PAVN/VC 12 miles (19 km) north of Phú Cường. At 13:00 a unit of the 3rd Brigade, 1st Infantry Division was landed by South Vietnamese riverine assault craft 6 miles (9.7 km) south-southeast of Dầu Tiếng and ambushed two groups of VC killing 13 and capturing two AK-47s. At 16:55 1/9th Cavalry helicopters killed five PAVN/VC 9 miles (14 km) north of Phú Cường. At 19:35 helicopters of the 25th Infantry Division killed 12 PAVN/VC 5 miles (8.0 km) northeast of Trảng Bàng.

On 12 July at 00:01 a unit of the 3rd Brigade, 1st Infantry Division ambushed an enemy force 12 miles (19 km) northeast of Go Dau Ha killing 12. At 13:05 a unit of the 1st Brigade, 1st Infantry Division engaged an enemy force 6 miles (9.7 km) northeast of Tây Ninh. The unit was reinforced by other units attempted to block the enemy escape and artillery and airstrikes were directed into the area. The enemy withdrew at 17:30 leaving 32 dead; U.S. losses were four killed. At 15:40 a unit of the 2nd Brigade, 1st Cavalry Division was engaged by an entrenched enemy force 8 miles (13 km) northeast of Phú Cường supported by artillery and airstrikes. The enemy withdrew at 16:00 leaving five dead; U.S. losses were two killed. A UH-1 was shot down in Long Khánh Province. On 13 July at 18:55 a reconnaissance unit of the 25th Infantry Division attacked an enemy force 13 miles (21 km) west of Củ Chi killing seven. At 19:00 a unit of the 2nd Brigade, 1st Cavalry Division engaged an enemy force 4 miles (6.4 km) northeast of Phú Cường killing five.

On 14 July at 04:50 a unit of the 3rd Brigade, 82nd Airborne Division was attacked by 10 PAVN/VC 1.2 miles (1.9 km) northeast of Hóc Môn losing four U.S. killed. At 10:30 a unit from the 2nd Brigade, 1st Cavalry Division attacked a PAVN force in bunkers 16 miles (26 km) northeast of Tây Ninh, artillery and airstrikes were directed onto the bunkers and the enemy withdrew leaving six dead. At 10:50 a unit of the 11th ACR was attacked by an enemy force 9 miles (14 km) southeast of Dầu Tiếng, the unit returned fire killing 11 PAVN/VC and capturing one individual and one crew-served weapon. At 12:55 a unit of the 2nd Brigade, 1st Cavalry Division found an enemy supply cache 12 miles (19 km) east-northeast of Dầu Tiếng. At 14:20 a unit of the 2nd Brigade, 25th Infantry Division found a 1.5 ton munitions cache 4 miles (6.4 km) northeast of Trảng Bàng including 41 individual weapons, two 60 mm mortars, two machineguns and two RPG-2 launchers. At 19:00 a unit of the 2nd Brigade, 25th Infantry Division found a 3-ton rice cache 9 miles northeast of Phú Cường. A UH-1 was destroyed when an ARVN soldier exiting the helicopter stepped on a landmine 6 miles (9.7 km) southwest of Tây Ninh, killing two ARVN soldiers. An OH-6 and a UH-1 collided while evading ground fire 12 miles (19 km) northeast of Bến Cát killing four.

On 15 July at 13:55 a convoy from Phước Vĩnh to Sông Bé was ambushed on Highway 14 14 miles (23 km) south-southeast of Sông Bé. A convoy security unit of the 11th ACR engaged the enemy and helicopter gunships and airstrikes hit the enemy positions. The enemy withdrew at 14:30 with unknown losses; U.S. losses were one killed. An OH-6 was shot down 7 miles (11 km) west-northwest of Phước Vĩnh killing one on board. On 16 July at 07:40 armored cavalry from the 3rd Brigade, 1st infantry division engaged an enemy force 5 miles (8.0 km) southwest of Bến Cát killing nine and capturing two individual weapons. At 15:15 a unit of the 199th LIB found a 10-ton food cache 16 miles (26 km) northeast of Xuân Lộc.

On 17 July at 12:15 a convoy from Lai Khê to Quản Lợi on Highway 13 was ambushed by a unit of the PAVN 1st Division 8 miles (13 km) south of An Lộc. The convoy escort from the 11th ACR and the ARVN 9th Regiment, 5th Division engaged the attackers supported by artillery fire and airstrikes and another unit of the 11th ACR joined the battle. The PAVN withdrew at 12:35 leaving eight dead and one captured. At 13:05 a unit from the 2nd Brigade, 1st Cavalry Division engaged an enemy force in bunkers 12 miles (19 km) north-northeast of Tây Ninh, the enemy withdrew at 16:20 leaving eight dead. At 14:00 helicopters from the 12th Combat Aviation Group found a 1-ton munitions cache 8 miles (13 km) northeast of Biên Hòa. At 16:00 a unit of the 2nd Brigade, 1st Cavalry Division found a 17.5 ton riche cache 5 miles (8.0 km) southeast of Katum. At 18:30 a 1/9th Cavalry helicopter was fired on by an estimated 14 PAVN/VC, the helicopter responded with machinegun fire and directed airstrikes onto the area and ten dead were observed in the strike area. At 20:15 a unit of the 3rd Brigade, 9th Infantry Division engaged an enemy force 4 miles (6.4 km) west of Tân An and directed artillery fire onto the area with unknown results. On 18 July at 09:20 a USAF aerial observer saw six dead PAVN/VC 16 miles (26 km) southwest of Củ Chi killed in an airstrike the previous day. At 10:00 mechanized infantry from the 1st Brigade, 25th Infantry Division engaged an enemy force 6 miles (9.7 km) north-northeast of Tây Ninh, the enemy withdrew at 14:10 leaving 27 dead. At 14:00 a unit of the 199th LIB found a 9-ton food cache 22 miles (35 km) north of Xuân Lộc. At 15:30 the 1/9th Cavalry found nine PAVN/VC graves 9 miles (14 km) east of Biên Hòa killed the previous day by artillery fire.

On 19 July at 14:00 mechanized infantry from the 2nd Brigade, 25th infantry Division found 15 PAVN/VC graves 9 miles (14 km) northeast of Go Dau Ha, they had apparently been killed by artillery two days earlier. At 15:00 a unit of the 199th LIB found a 4-ton food cache 24 miles (39 km) north-northeast of Xuân Lộc. At 17:15 a unit of the 3rd Brigade, 1st Infantry Division directed helicopter gunship and artillery fire onto a 20 enemy soldiers 5 miles (8.0 km) south of Dầu Tiếng, a sweep of the area found six PAVN/VC dead. At 17:45 a unit of the 2nd Brigade, 25th Infantry Division air assaulted into a landing zone 6 miles (9.7 km) northeast of Trảng Bàng and were immediately engaged by a PAVN force from the 9th Division. Artillery and airstrikes were called in and the PAVN withdrew at 19:15 leaving 47 dead and ten captured and 17 AK-47s and ten RPG launchers. At 18:25 a unit from the 11th ACR engaged an enemy force 9 miles (14 km) west of Lai Khê, killing nine and capturing one.

On 20 July at 09:30 mechanized infantry from the 1st Brigade, 25th infantry Division received ten rounds of 82 mm mortar fire 5 miles (8.0 km) northeast of Tây Ninh, artillery was directed onto the firing position and a sweep of the area found 11 dead PAVN/VC and one 82 mm mortar. At 11:10 a unit of the 2nd Brigade, 1st Cavalry Division found seven dead PAVN in a bunker complex destroyed by airstrikes 6 miles (9.7 km) east of Phú Cường. Further searches of the area found another 15 PAVN killed by airstrikes. On 21 July at 00:55 a unit of the 2nd Brigade, 25th Infantry Division ambushed an estimated 20 PAVN/VC 4 miles (6.4 km) west of Phú Cường supported by helicopter and fixed wing gunships killing seven nd capturing one. At 07:30 a helicopter gunship of the 1st Cavalry Division received 12.7mm machinegun fire 4 miles south-southeast of Katum, the gunship engaged the position and called in airstrikes killing 11 PAVN/VC. At 12:20 a unit of the 3rd Brigade, 9th Infantry Division operating 4 miles south of Bến Lức engaged with an enemy force killing 12 and capturing one individual and two crew-served weapons.

On 22 July at 01:30 helicopter gunships of the 1st Cavalry Division received heavy ground fire 6 miles (9.7 km) south-southeast of Sông Bé and artillery fire was directed onto the area following which 12 PAVN/VC bodies were seen in the strike area. At 01:55 a unit of the 3rd Brigade, 25th Infantry Division and RF troops engaged an enemy platoon 4 miles (6.4 km) west of Củ Chi, the PAVN/VC lost one killed and the U.S. one killed. At 14:55 a unit of the 1st Brigade, 1st Cavalry Division found a 7.5 ton rice cache 5 miles (8.0 km) southeast of Katum. At 21:30 Rangers from the 3rd Brigade, 9th Infantry Division ambushed six PAVN/VC on two sampans 6 miles northwest of Tân An killing all six. On 23 July at 08:25 a unit of the 1st Brigade, 1st Cavalry Division found an 8-ton rice cache 2.5 miles (4.0 km) southeast of Katum. At 09:30 helicopter gunships from the armored cavalry squadron of the 25th Infantry Division attacked an enemy force 3 miles (4.8 km) southwest of Đức Hòa killing eight. At 09:15 a unit of the 11th ACR found a 5-ton munitions cache 9 miles (14 km) east of Dầu Tiếng containing 213 RPG-2 rounds and other ammunition. At 09:45 mechanized infantry of the 1st Brigade, 25th Infantry Division engaged an enemy force 5 miles (8.0 km) northeast of Tây Ninh killing five. At 10:00 helicopters of the 1st Cavalry Division attacked and killed five PAVN/VC 9 miles (14 km) northeast of An Lộc.

On 24 July at 09:40 a unit of the 3rd Brigade, 1st Cavalry Division killed five PAVN/VC 8 miles (13 km) northeast of An Lộc. At 12:55 a unit of the 2nd Brigade, 1st Cavalry Division found a destroyed bunker complex 16 miles (26 km) northeast of Tây Ninh containing 19 dead PAVN, 2 tons of rice and assorted munitions. At 21:30 mechanized infantry from the 3rd Brigade, 9th Infantry Division engaged an enemy unit 4 miles (6.4 km) southwest of Cần Đước killing five. A UH-1 was shot down 15 miles (24 km) east of Mộc Hóa killing seven U.S. and two ARVN on board. At 20:45 an enemy force was observed near Dầu Tiếng Base Camp, mechanized infantry and armored forces from the 1st Brigade, 1st Infantry Division deployed to the area and engaged the enemy supported by artillery and AC-47 gunship fire. The enemy withdrew at 04:30 leaving 14 dead and 11 individual weapons. A USAF F-100 was shot down 4 miles (6.4 km) west of Biên Hòa. On 25 July at 11:15 a unit from the 3rd Brigade, 1st Cavalry Division found the graves of 14 PAVN/VC 7 miles (11 km) south of Sông Bé. At 11:40 a unit of the 11th ACR engaged an enemy force 9 miles (14 km) east of Dầu Tiếng killing 12 and capturing three and ten individual and one crew-served weapons. At 18:40 a unit of the 3rd Brigade, 9th Infantry Division engaged an enemy force 9 miles west-northwest of Tân An killing eight and capturing one individual weapon.

On 26 July at 08:10 the 1/9th Cavalry directed artillery and airstrikes onto a bunker complex 4 miles (6.4 km) east-southeast of Katum, four PAVN/VC were killed in the strikes. At 08:15 a unit of the 1st Brigade, 1st Cavalry Division found 19 PAVN/VC graves 11 miles (18 km) south-southeast of Katum, they were apparently killed by small arms fire one month earlier. A USAF OV-10 Bronco was shot down in Bình Dương Province.

On 27 July at 08:00 a unit of the 2nd Brigade, 25th Infantry Division engaged an enemy force 3 miles (4.8 km) northeast of Trảng Bàng supported by artillery and helicopter gunships. The enemy withdrew at 11:30 leaving 24 dead and 14 AK-47s and one 60 mm mortar. At 11:20 a unit of the 2nd Brigade, 25th Infantry Division found a supply cache 6 miles (9.7 km) northeast of Trảng Bàng. At 12:05 helicopter gunships of the 1st Cavalry Division engaged an enemy force 19 miles (31 km) southwest of Sông Bé killing five PAVN/VC. At 17:30 the same unit attacked 60 PAVN/VC 25 miles (40 km) south-southeast of Sông Bé and directed artillery and airstrikes onto the area. An aerial observed later reported 24 dead in the strike area. At 20:45 a reconnaissance platoon composed on soldiers from the 3rd Brigade, 82nd Airborne Division and Popular Forces was ambushed 4 miles (6.4 km) northwest of Hóc Môn, they returned fire killing six PAVN/VC for no losses.

On 28 July at 03:35 the armored cavalry squadron of the 25th Infantry Division in a night defensive position 8 miles (13 km) northeast of Go Dau Ha was attacked by a platoon size force, the attackers withdrew after 30 minutes with unknown losses. At 11:00 helicopter gunships from the armored cavalry squadron of the 1st Infantry Division engaged an enemy force 5 miles (8.0 km) southeast of Dầu Tiếng. The fighting continued until 14:20 when the enemy withdrew leaving ten dead; U.S. losses were two killed. At 11:20 infantry and mechanized infantry of the 2nd Brigade, 25th Infantry Division engaged an enemy force 4 miles (6.4 km) northeast of Trảng Bàng, supporting fires were brought in and the unit was reinforced before the enemy withdrew at 17:40 leaving 53 dead and 24 AK-47s, four RPG launchers and a 12.7mm machinegun; U.S. losses were three killed. At 15:50 a reconnaissance unit from the 3rd Brigade, 9th Infantry Division found the bodies of 13 PAVN/VC 4 miles (6.4 km) southeast of Tân An, all were killed by artillery fire two days previously. At 17:05 a mechanized unit from the 1st Brigade, 1st Infantry Division engaged an enemy force 5 miles southeast of Dầu Tiếng, the enemy withdrew after an hour leaving seven dead; U.S. losses were one killed. An OH-6 was shot down 6 miles (9.7 km) northeast of Trảng Bàng.

On 29 July at 04:00 a U.S. Navy SEAL team engaged 20 enemy soldiers 12 miles (19 km) southeast of Tân An. U.S. Navy helicopter gunships supported the SEALs and the enemy withdrew at 06:00 leaving ten dead and four captured and four individual weapons. At 09:00 a CIDG unit engaged an enemy force 15 miles (24 km) west-southwest of Đức Hòa and 4 miles (6.4 km) southeast of the Cambodian border. The CIDG were supported by artillery, helicopter gunships and airstrikes and then at 15:00 by a unit of the 3rd Brigade, 25th infantry Division. The enemy withdrew at 18:30 leaving 63 dead, U.S. losses were nine killed. At 12:00 helicopter gunships from the 25th Infantry Division engaged an enemy force 19 miles (31 km) northeast of Tân An killing 20. At 13:30 helicopter gunships of the 1/9th Cavalry engaged an enemy force 12 miles (19 km) south-southeast of Đồng Xoài and also called in airstrikes on the area killing nine PAVN/VC and destroying 15 bunkers. At 20:45 a patrol from the 2nd Brigade, 25th Infantry Division directed artillery fire onto ten enemy soldiers 4 miles northeast of Trảng Bàng killing them all.

On 30 July at 09:25 U.S. Navy helicopter gunships sank four sampans 18 miles (29 km) north of Vũng Tàu killing seven PAVN/VC. At 11:30 helicopters of the 12th Combat Aviation Group engaged an enemy squad 14 miles (23 km) east-northeast of Tân An, a sweep of the area found six PAVN/VC dead and captured one. At 13:15 an OH-6 of the 1/9th Cavalry was shot down 5 miles (8.0 km) east of Katum, air cavalry troops were landed to protect the crew while artillery. Helicopter gunships and airstrikes hit enemy positions killing seven PAVN/VC and capturing one crew-served weapon. On 31 July at 10:05 the armored cavalry squadron of the 1st Infantry Division found a weapons cache 2.5 miles (4.0 km) northwest of Bến Cát including three 60 mm mortars, one 81 mm mortar and one 12.7mm machinegun. At 17:45 a unit of the 3rd Brigade, 9th Infantry Division engaged an enemy force 15 miles (24 km) west-southwest of Trà Cú killing five. At 18:30 an AH-1 gunship of the 12th Combat Aviation Group received ground fire 4 miles (6.4 km) east of Trảng Bàng and returned fire, a later sweep of the area found seven PAVN/VC dead and captured one.

Cumulative operational results to the end of July were 21,446 PAVN/VC killed, 2,914 captured and 5,559 individual and 1,385 crew-served weapons captured. U.S. losses were 1,303 killed.

=== August ===
On 1 August at 21:30 helicopters from the 25th Infantry Division attacked an enemy squad 8 miles (13 km) northeast of Trảng Bàng killing seven. On 2 August at 09:30 a unit of the 2nd Brigade, 1st Cavalry Division found an enemy supply cache 12 miles (19 km) west-southwest of Sông Bé. At 11:55 the armored cavalry squadron of the 25th Infantry Division engaged an enemy force 3 miles (4.8 km) northeast of Trảng Bàng supported by airstrikes killing 15 PAVN/VC. At 16:00 a unit of the 2nd Brigade, 25th Infantry Division engaged an enemy force 9 miles (14 km) northeast of Trảng Bàng, the enemy withdrew at 18:30 leaving 13 dead and four individual and one crew-served weapons; U.S. losses were one killed. At 21:20 helicopter gunships of the 25th Infantry Division attacked an enemy force 5 miles (8.0 km) northwest of Trảng Bàng killing five.

On 3 August at 03:00 a patrol from the 1st Brigade, 25th Infantry Division directed artillery fire onto an enemy squad 2 miles (3.2 km) southwest of Phú Cường killing six. At 11:55 a unit of the 3rd Brigade, 9th Infantry Division engaged an enemy force 15 miles (24 km) west of Đức Hòa. Artillery and helicopter gunship fire was directed onto the area and the enemy withdrew at 18:30 leaving 39 dead and seven captured and six individual and two crew-served weapons. At midday a unit of the 1st Brigade, 1st Cavalry Division found a weapons cache 11 miles (18 km) northeast of Phú Cường. At 12:50 a USAF FAC directed helicopter gunships and airstrikes onto an enemy force 9 miles (14 km) northwest of Lộc Ninh killing 11 PAVN/VC. At 14:45 scout helicopters of the 1st Cavalry Division observed five dead PAVN/VC 30 miles (48 km) north-northwest of Xuân Lộc, they had apparently been killed earlier that in an airstrike. An OH-6 was shot down 16 miles (26 km) west of Đức Hòa. On 4 August at 08:30 a reconnaissance unit from the 1st Cavalry Division engaged a PAVN/VC force 11 miles (18 km) southeast of Phước Vĩnh supported by helicopter gunships, killing 23 in a 50-minute skirmish. At 10:00 helicopter gunships from the 12th Combat Aviation Group attacked five PAVN/VC 3 miles (4.8 km) north-northwest of Củ Chi, a sweep of the area by a unit of the 2nd Brigade, 25th Infantry Division found five dead and killed a further seven and captured 11 individual weapons. At 12:25 a unit of the 1st Brigade, 1st Cavalry Division found a complex of 75-100 bunkers 8 miles (13 km) northeast of Phú Cường, inside the complex were six dead PAVN/VC a hospital and a munitions cache.

On 5 August at 11:25 mechanized infantry of the 1st Brigade, 25th Infantry Division engaged an enemy force 10 miles (16 km) east-northeast of Tây Ninh killing five. At 14:20 a USAF FAC directed helicopter gunships of the 11th ACR onto an enemy force 7 miles (11 km) northwest of Lộc Ninh killing eight. At 16:10 a unit of the 1st Brigade, 25th Infantry Division and an ARVN Airborne battalion in a sweep 11 miles (18 km) northeast of Go Dau Ha engaged an enemy force killing 35 and capturing eight individual weapons; U.S. losses were one killed. On 6 August at 07:25 a USAF FAC observed the bodies of 12 PAVN/VC killed by airstrikes earlier that day 5 miles (8.0 km) northeast of Trảng Bàng. At 09:00 infantry from the 3rd Brigade, 9th Infantry Division patrolling 6 miles (9.7 km) east of Rach Kien found the bodies of six PAVN/VC killed earlier that day by artillery fire among 14 destroyed bunkers. At 09:35 units of the ARVN 25th Division and the 2nd Brigade, 25th Infantry Division engaged an enemy force 4 miles (6.4 km) northeast of Trảng Bàng. The enemy withdrew at 14:40 leaving 22 dead and ten individual and one crew-served weapons. At 13:10 mechanized infantry of the 1st Brigade, 25th Infantry Division engaged an enemy platoon 9 miles (14 km) northeast of Go Dau Ha supported by artillery, helicopter gunships and airstrikes. The enemy withdrew at 14:30 leaving seven dead and four individual weapons; U.S. losses were one killed. At 18:00 helicopter gunships from the 11th ACR attacked an enemy unit 11 miles (18 km) northwest of Lộc Ninh killing 13.

On 7 August at 07:25 a unit of the 1st Brigade, 1st Cavalry Division found a 17-ton supply cache 12 miles (19 km) southeast of Katum that included 192 RPG-2 rounds. At midday a unit of the 199th LIB found a bunker complex 11 miles (18 km) northeast of Xuân Lộc, while destroying the bunkers thy received small arms fire and engaged supported by helicopter gunships. The enemy was reengaged at 17:10 and artillery helicopter and fixed wing gunship fire was directed onto them killing 11; U.S. losses were three killed. At 13:30 a unit of the 1st Brigade, 1st Cavalry Division found a 3-ton supply cache 9 miles (14 km) southeast of Katum. On 8 August at 11:10 a unit of the 2nd Brigade, 25th Infantry Division found a 3-ton rice cache 4 miles (6.4 km) east of Trảng Bàng. At 11:20 RF units and a unit of the 1st Brigade, 25th Infantry Division engaged an enemy force 4 miles west of Phú Cường, the skirmish continued until 15:00 when the enemy withdrew leaving nine dead. At 11:55 a light observation helicopter reconnoitring an area 4 miles southwest of Trảng Bàng drew ground fire and directed airstrikes onto the area, six PAVN/VC dead were seen in the strike area. At 16:10 a unit of the 3rd Brigade, 25th Infantry Division engaged an enemy force 4 miles southwest of Trảng Bàng killing nine. At 18:15 a unit of the 11th ACR operating 6 miles (9.7 km) east-northeast of Dầu Tiếng found the bodies of five PAVN/VC killed in earlier airstrikes. The 1/9th Cavalry operating in support of the 11th ACR killed a further six PAVN/VC in the same area.

On 9 August at 09:05 helicopters from the 11th ACR attacked an enemy force 9 miles (14 km) west of An Lộc, air cavalry troops were landed in the area and found 38 PAVN dead and captured six. At 11:45 helicopter gunships from 1/9th Cavalry attacked an estimated 90 PAVN/VC 9 miles west-northwest of An Lộc and also directed artillery and airstrikes onto the area killing 25. At 11:55 units of the ARVN 25th Division and the 1st Brigade, 25th Infantry Division patrolling 5 miles (8.0 km) south-southeast of Dầu Tiếng engaged an enemy force killing four and capturing one individual and two crew-served weapons; U.S. losses were one killed. At 14:20 the 1/9th Cavalry attacked a PAVN unit 7 miles (11 km) east-southeast of Katum supported by artillery and airstrikes. At 17:25 a unit of the 1st Brigade, 1st Cavalry Division was landed to reinforce and the PAVN withdrew shortly afterwards leaving 30 dead; U.S. losses were one killed. An OH-6 was shot down in the engagement killing all three on board.

On 10 August at 05:30 a Ranger unit from the 3rd Brigade, 9th Infantry Division killed six PAVN/VC in a marsh area 9 miles (14 km) west of Bến Lức and captured one AK-47, 60 RPG rounds and five 122 mm rockets. At 10:00 a unit of the 1st Brigade, 25th Infantry Division and a unit of the ARVN 25th Division operating 11 miles (18 km) northeast of Go Dau Ha found the bodies of ten PAVN/VC killed the previous day. At 13:10 helicopter gunships from the 11th ACR attacked an enemy company 9 miles northwest of An Lộc. Troops from the regiment were air-assaulted into the area and joined later by the 1/9th Cavalry and mechanized infantry from the ARVN 9th Regiment, 5th Division. The enemy withdrew at 16:30 leaving 31 dead and eight captured. At 17:00 an observation helicopter from the 12th Combat Aviation Group drew fire 9 miles west of Định Quán District, artillery and helicopter gunship fire was directed onto the area killing five PAVN/VC. At 18:15 another observation helicopter from the group drew fire 7 miles (11 km) southeast of Định Quán and directed artillery and airstrikes onto the position killing six PAVN/VC. On 11 August at 03:00 a unit of the 1st Brigade, 1st Cavalry Division in a night defensive position 7 miles southeast of Katum received 50 rounds of mixed 60/82 mm mortar fire followed by a ground attack by a PAVN company. The defenders were supported by artillery, helicopter gunship and AC-47 and AC-119 fire. The PAVN withdrew after 40 minutes leaving 17 dead and assorted munitions; U.S. losses were four killed. At 18:00 helicopter gunships of the 3rd Brigade, 1st Infantry Division engaged an enemy force 12 miles (19 km) northwest of Lai Khê. A unit of the brigade was air-assaulted into the area and engaged an estimated 50 PAVN/VC, after two hours the enemy withdrew leaving six dead; U.S. losses were two killed.

On 12 August at 01:30 a PAVN force attacked the night defensive position of a unit of the 11th ACR 2 miles (3.2 km) west of Lộc Ninh, the PAVN withdrew at 03:30 leaving five dead. Also at 01:30 a night defensive position of a unit of the 11th ACR 5 miles (8.0 km) south-southwest of An Lộc was hit by RPG fire, the unit fired back forcing the enemy to withdraw leaving 11 dead; U.S. losses were six dead. At 01:45 a landing zone occupied by a unit of the 11th ACR and a unit of the ARVN 5th Division 4 miles (6.4 km) west-southwest of An Lộc was attacked by PAVN. The attacked was repulsed with artillery and AC-47 gunship support resulting in 78 PAVN killed and two captured; U.S. losses were two killed. At 02:00 the base of the 3rd Brigade 1st Cavalry Division 4 miles northeast of An Lộc was attacked by a PAVN force composed of troops from the 271st and 272nd Regiments, 9th Division. At 04:30 the PAVN withdrew leaving 48 dead and seven captured; U.S. losses were three killed. At 02:05 a PAVN force attacked a night defensive position of a unit of the 11th ACR 5 miles south of Lộc Ninh resulting in 12 PAVN killed and one U.S. killed. At 02:15 an ambush patrol of the 3rd Brigade, 1st Cavalry Division 2 miles southeast of Quản Lợi engaged a 100-strong PAVN unit. Artillery and AC-47 fire support was provided and the PAVN withdrew at 03:40 leaving 23 dead and three individual and two crew-served weapons; U.S. losses were one killed. At 02:30 a firebase of the 11th ACR 4 miles south-southwest of An Lộc was attacked by PAVN, the attack continued until 04:00 when the PAVN withdrew leaving 32 dead and one captured; U.S. losses were one killed. At 02:35 a PAVN force attacked the night defensive position of the 2nd Brigade, 1st Cavalry Division 17 miles (27 km) east-southeast of Phước Bình. The attack continued until 04:45 when the PAVN withdrew leaving 30 dead and one captured and 15 individual and one crew-served weapon; U.S. losses were two killed. At 04:00 a night defensive position of the 1st Brigade, 1st Cavalry Division 7 miles (11 km) southeast of Katum was attacked by PAVN with a mortar round detonating an ammunition storage area. The PAVN withdrew after 50 minutes leaving 59 dead and one 12.7mm machinegun, one 60 mm mortar and two 82 mm mortars; U.S. losses were 13 killed. At 07:10 a unit of the 3rd Brigade, 25th Infantry Division was air-assaulted into an area 4 miles north of Hiệp Hòa and immediately engaged an enemy force. Artillery, helicopter gunships and airstrikes were provided in support and other brigade elements reinforced. The enemy withdrew at 19:40 leaving 16 dead and two individual and seven crew-served weapons; U.S. losses were four killed. At 07:45 mechanized infantry of the 1st Infantry Division engaged an enemy battalion 3 miles (4.8 km) northeast of An Lộc. The unit was reinforced by units of the division, the 11th ACR and the 3rd Brigade, 1st Cavalry Division. Th enemy withdrew after nine hours leaving 12 dead; U.S. losses were two killed. At 08:00 a unit of the 11th ACR received fire from a PAVN force 4 miles southwest of An Lộc, the PAVN withdrew but the unit reestablished contact at 13:00 and helicopter gunships and airstrikes supported the attack. The PAVN withdrew at 16:00 leaving 53 dead; U.S. losses were one killed. At 09:50 a unit of the 11th ACR engaged an enemy force 5 miles north of Lộc Ninh killing six in a seven hour long engagement. At 12:30 helicopter gunships of the 1st Brigade, 1st Cavalry Division engaged 25 PAVN/VC 4 miles south of Katum killing 17. At 15:30 mechanized infantry of the 3rd Brigade, 1st Infantry Division providing convoy security on Highway received fire 7 miles south of An Lộc. The engagement continued until 16:45 when the enemy withdrew leaving 61 dead and two captured; U.S. losses were two killed. At 15:45 a unit of the 1st Brigade, 1st Cavalry Division found the bodies of 35 PAVN/VC 12 miles (19 km) southeast of Katum, they appeared to have been killed earlier in the day and evacuated. At 18:15 a unit of the 2nd Brigade, 1st Cavalry Division in a night defensive position 14 miles (23 km) east of Phước Bình was attacked, the unit fought back supported by artillery and helicopter gunships. The enemy withdrew at 19:00 leaving 16 dead and four AK-47s and one light machinegun; U.S. losses were four killed.

On 13 August at midday a unit of the 11th ACR engaged a PAVN unit from the 7th Division 2 miles (3.2 km) west-southwest of Lộc Ninh, other regiment units and the ARVN 34th Ranger Battalion reinforced the contact and artillery and helicopter gunship support was also provided. The PAVN withdrew at 16:20 leaving 79 dead and 20 AK-47s and seven RPG launchers; U.S. losses were two killed. At 16:30 helicopter gunships of the 1st Cavalry Division engaged an enemy force 9 miles (14 km) north-northeast of Lộc Ninh killing 21. At 23:40 an armored cavalry unit from the 1st Infantry Division in a night defensive position 6 miles (9.7 km) east of An Lộc received mortar and recoilless rifle fire followed by a ground assault. The enemy withdrew within 15 minutes with unknown losses while the U.S. losses were one killed.

On 14 August at 05:00 a landing zone of the 3rd Brigade, 1st Cavalry Division 4 miles (6.4 km) northwest of An Lộc was hit by 60/81 mm mortar fire followed by a ground attack by a PAVN battalion. Fighting continued until 10:00 when the PAVN withdrew leaving 31 dead and one captured. At 10:20 a unit of the 11th ACR and the ARVN 34th Rangers engaged a PAVN force 2 miles (3.2 km) northeast of Lộc Ninh, the PAVN withdrew at 11:40 leaving 20 dead and three individual and two crew-served weapons. At 11:30 mechanized infantry from the 1st Brigade, 1st Infantry Division escorting a convoy was ambushed 14 miles (23 km) south of An Lộc, the enemy withdrew after 30 minutes leaving 20 dead and five individual weapons. At 13:10 a unit of the 11th ACR and the 34th Rangers engaged a PAVN unit 2 miles northeast of Lộc Ninh, the PAVN withdrew at 15:25 leaving 21 dead. At 15:30 a reconnaissance unit from the 3rd Brigade, 9th Infantry Division engaged an enemy platoon 22 miles (35 km) east of Tân An, killing 12. At 19:55 a unit of the 1st Brigade, 1st Cavalry Division in a night defensive position 12 miles (19 km) south-southeast of Katum received mortar fire followed by a ground attack. The enemy withdrew after two hours leaving 23 dead and three individual and one crew-served weapons. At 21:30 a unit of the 3rd Brigade, 25th Infantry Division in night defensive positions 4 miles north of Hiệp Hòa received mortar fire followed by a ground attack. The unit fought back with organic weapons, artillery, helicopter gunship and AC-47 support. During the battle a UH-1 was shot down and crashed nearby killing all seven on board, PAVN/C losses were unknown. At 21:50 a patrol from the 2nd Brigade, 1st Infantry Division ambushed an enemy unit 6 miles (9.7 km) south-southeast of Dầu Tiếng killing 12. An OH-6 was shot down 17 miles (27 km) north of Tây Ninh killing one on board.

On 15 August at 00:55 a unit of the 1st Brigade, 1st Cavalry Division at a landing zone 16 miles (26 km) southeast of Katum was attacked by an enemy force, the enemy withdrew at 02:10 leaving seven dead; U.S. losses were one killed. At 09:50 a unit of the 1st Brigade, 25th Infantry Division and a unit of the ARVN 25th Division engaged an enemy unit 15 miles (24 km) west of Tây Ninh supported by artillery and helicopter gunships. The enemy withdrew at 18:30 leaving 31 dead and two 12.7mm machineguns. At 12:30 the 1/9th Cavalry received mortar fire 22 miles (35 km) northeast of Tây Ninh killing two U.S. soldiers. At 20:25 a firebase near Lộc Ninh occupied by a unit of the 11th ACR was attacked, the attackers withdrew after 15 minutes with unknown losses. At 21:10 a patrol by a unit of the 11th ACR with RF forces was ambushed 0.6 miles (0.97 km) west-northwest of Lộc Ninh, the ambushers withdrew within ten minutes with unknown losses. At 21:35 a unit of the 1st Brigade, 1st Cavalry Division in a night defensive position 12 miles (19 km) southeast of Katum was attacked, the enemy withdrew at 22:20 with unknown losses. At 21:45 a unit of the 1st Brigade, 1st Infantry Division ambushed a PAVN/VC unit 6 miles (9.7 km) east-southeast of Dầu Tiếng killing nine and capturing three AK-47s. On 16 August at 02:45 a landing zone of the 3rd Brigade, 1st Cavalry Division 4 miles (6.4 km) northwest of An Lộc was attacked by an estimated battalion. The unit fought back supported by artillery and helicopter gunships. The enemy withdrew at 04:20 leaving ten dead and three individual and two crew-served weapons and 25 RPG-2 rounds. At 08:45 a unit of the 1st Brigade, 1st Cavalry Division engaged a PAVN force 7 miles (11 km) south of Katum, the enemy withdrew at 12:30 leaving 25 dead and two individual weapons; U.S. losses were one killed.

On 17 August at 08:20 1/9th Cavalry helicopters directed artillery fire onto an enemy unit 10 miles (16 km) north-northwest of Lộc Ninh killing eight PAVN/VC. At 14:30 a unit of the 1st Brigade, 1st Cavalry Division engaged an enemy unit 10 miles northeast of Phú Cường, the enemy withdrew after two hours leaving nine dead and three individual weapons; U.S. losses were one killed. At 16:40 helicopter gunships of the 1st Cavalry Division killed seven PAVN/VC 9 miles (14 km) north of Lộc Ninh. At 20:40 U.S. Navy PBRSs engaged 50–60 PAVN/VC 3 miles (4.8 km) northwest of Phú Cường supported by artillery, helicopter gunships and AC-47 and AC-119s. The enemy withdrew at 22:10 leaving eight dead, however shortly afterwards helicopter gunships engaged an enemy force numbering 50-70 a mile away killing 33. An OH-6 was shot down 3 miles northwest of Phú Cường. On 18 August at 13:55 a unit of the 199th LIB received fire from two enemy platoons 12 miles (19 km) northeast of Xuân Lộc, the enemy withdrew after 30 minutes leaving two dead and two individual and one crew-served weapon; U.S. losses were two killed. At 15:20 a unit of the 11th ACR engaged an enemy force 4 miles (6.4 km) north of Lộc Ninh killing five and capturing an AK-47. At 15:40 helicopters from the 3rd Brigade, 9th Infantry Division attacked ten PAVN/VC 4 miles south of Bến Lức killing eight and capturing three individual weapons. At 17:55 a unit of the 1st Brigade, 1st Cavalry Division engaged an enemy force 9 miles southeast of Katum killing seven and capturing six individual weapons and two 107 mm rockets.

On 19 August at 01:35 the Quản Lợi Base Camp occupied by the 3rd Brigade, 1st Cavalry Division was attacked. During the attack a tank gun was accidentally fired onto a reaction force in the northwest of the base killing nine U.S. soldiers. The enemy withdrew at 02:00 with unknown losses. At 09:45 mechanized infantry of the 1st Brigade, 25th Infantry Division engaged an enemy force 9 miles (14 km) northeast of Go Dau Ha. The fighting continued until 14:30 when the enemy withdrew leaving 23 dead and three individual weapons; U.S. losses were five killed. On 20 August at 08:40 a unit of the 3rd Brigade, 9th Infantry Division found 11 PAVN/VC bodies 6 miles (9.7 km) north of Cần Đước killed by airstrikes the previous day. At 09:40 an air cavalry unit of the 3rd Brigade, 1st Cavalry Division engaged a PAVN force 3 miles (4.8 km) west-southwest of Lộc Ninh, the PAVN withdrew after two hours leaving ten dead, U.S. losses were one killed. At 11:00 a unit of the 3rd Brigade, 9th Infantry Division engaged an enemy force 5 miles (8.0 km) north of Cần Đước, the enemy withdrew at 13:00, but the unit pursued and reengaged at 15:00. The enemy withdrew again leaving 35 dead and two captured; U.S. losses were one killed.

On 21 August at 01:50 a unit of the 1st Brigade, 25th Infantry Division in a night defensive position 5 miles (8.0 km) northeast of Tây Ninh was attacked by an enemy company. The unit was supported by artillery, helicopter gunships and AC-47s. the enemy withdrew at 07:15 leaving 41 dead and three captured and four individual and three crew-served weapons. At 12:50 mechanized infantry of the 1st Infantry Division providing convoy security on Highway 13 was ambushed by a PAVN unit from the 7th Division 6 miles (9.7 km) south of Lộc Ninh. The PAVN withdrew at 14:00 leaving 11 dead and one captured and five AK-47s and one RPG launcher. At 13:00 mechanized infantry of the 2nd Brigade, 25th Infantry Division patrolling 3 miles (4.8 km) east of Trảng Bàng killed six PAVN/VC and captured one individual weapon. At 16:55 a unit of the 2nd Brigade, 25th Infantry Division engaged an enemy force 3 miles east of Trảng Bàng, the enemy withdrew at 18:4 leaving six dead and one individual and one crew-served weapon. On 22 August at 00:50 a unit of the 2nd Brigade, 1st Infantry Division was attacked by fire 4 miles (6.4 km) west-southwest of Phú Cường, the enemy withdrew 30 minutes later with unknown losses; U.S. losses were two killed. At 17:45 helicopter gunships of the 2nd Brigade, 1st Infantry Division attacked seven PAVN/VC 7 miles (11 km) west-northwest of Phú Cường killing all seven. On 23 August at 12:50 a unit of the 3rd Brigade, 1st Cavalry Division found the graves of 40 PAVN/VC 4 miles west-southwest of Lộc Ninh, all had been killed by small arms fire in the preceding week. At 17:15 a unit of the 199th LIB found a weapons cache 16 miles (26 km) north-northeast of Bearcat including 13 individual weapons, two RPG launchers and 67 RPG-2 rounds.

On 24 August at 09:00 mechanized infantry of the 3rd Brigade, 1st Infantry Division engaged 20–30 enemy 8 miles (13 km) southeast of Dầu Tiếng supported by artillery, helicopter gunships and airstrikes. Other Brigade units joined the battle and the enemy withdrew at 15:40, but the infantry pursued and reestablished contact until the enemy withdrew at 17:35 leaving 28 dead. At 10:00 helicopter gunships from the 12th Combat Aviation Group engaged an enemy unit 11 miles (18 km) southwest of Trà Cú with unknown results. A Ranger unit from the 3rd Brigade, 9th Infantry Division was then air-assaulted into the area and immediately engaged enemy forces, killing nine and capturing one, the prisoner identified one of the dead as Colonel Hai Tram, commander of PAVN/VC Sub-region 3. At midday a unit of the 2nd Brigade, 25th infantry Division engaged an enemy force 8 miles southwest of Bến Cát supported by artillery, helicopter gunships and airstrikes. The enemy withdrew at 18:45 leaving 48 dead and one captured and 21 individual weapons; U.S. losses were two killed. At 13:45 a unit of the 1st Brigade, 1st Cavalry Division received 20 rounds of 60 mm mortar fire while operating 9 miles (14 km) southeast of Katum, artillery and helicopter gunship fire was directed onto the firing position with unknown results. The same unit received more fire later that afternoon resulting in one U.S. killed. At 14:45 a reconnaissance unit of the 1st Infantry Division directed artillery and helicopter gunship fire onto a group of 17 PAVN/VC 10 miles (16 km) south-southeast of An Lộc and ten bodies were seen in the strike area.

On 25 August at 14:45 mechanized infantry of the 1st brigade, 25th Infantry Division engaged an enemy squad 5 miles (8.0 km) northeast of Tây Ninh, the enemy withdrew after 40 minutes leaving seven dead. On 26 August at 14:40 a 2.5 ton truck of the 3rd Battalion, 197th Field Artillery Regiment hit a landmine on Highway 13 3 miles (4.8 km) north-northeast of Lai Khê killing all five New Hampshire Army National Guard soldiers on board. At 17:00 a unit of the 1st Brigade, 1st Cavalry Division found a bunker complex 9 miles (14 km) southeast of Katum and 33 PAVN/VC bodies killed by artillery fire the previous day. At 18:10 mechanized infantry of the 3rd Brigade, 9th Infantry Division engaged an enemy squad 2 miles (3.2 km) southeast of Tân An, killing five in a 20-minute skirmish. An OH-6 was shot down 17 miles (27 km) north-northeast of Xuân Lộc.

On 27 August at 01:35 a U.S. Navy PBR and a patrol from the 1st Brigade, 1st Infantry Division ambushed a 15-20 man PAVN/VC unit attempting to cross the Saigon River 8 miles (13 km) south-southeast of Dầu Tiếng, the area was illuminated by flares and helicopter gunships and an AC-47 also engaged, killing 15 PAVN/VC. At 08:25 the air cavalry of the armored cavalry squadron of the 1st Infantry Division engaged an enemy force 6 miles (9.7 km) southeast of Dầu Tiếng killing 14 and capturing one together with seven AK-47s, six SKS, one light machinegun, one RPG launcher, a 60 mm mortar and two pistols. At 10:30 a unit of the 2nd Brigade, 1st Cavalry Division found six PAVN/VC graves 4 miles (6.4 km) south of Sông Bé. At 13:30 a reconnaissance unit of the 1st Brigade, 1st Infantry Division engaged 15 soldiers in a bunker complex 8 miles south-southeast of Dầu Tiếng, the enemy withdrew after three hours leaving one dead; U.S. losses were three killed. At 15:30 a unit of the 2nd Brigade, 1st Cavalry Division engaged an enemy force 9 miles (14 km) northwest of Sông Bé directing artillery and helicopter gunship fire onto the enemy positions killing six for the loss of one U.S. killed. At 17:55 a unit of the 11th ACR received fire from a PAVN platoon 5 miles (8.0 km) south-southwest of An Lộc, the PAVN withdrew after 20 minutes leaving seven dead. At 18:40 an engineer unit retrieving a vehicle 7 miles (11 km) southwest of An Lộc received fire and returned fire supported by artillery killing five PAVN/VC.

On 28 August at 12:05 the air cavalry of the armored cavalry squadron of the 1st Infantry Division engaged an enemy force 6 miles (9.7 km) southeast of Dầu Tiếng, the enemy withdrew leaving six dead and four individual weapons. At 12:15 a unit of the 2nd Brigade, 1st Cavalry Division air-assaulted into an area 4 miles (6.4 km) south-southeast of Sông Bé and were immediately met by fire. The enemy broke contact at 13:35 but the unit reestablished contact again at 13:50 and the enemy finally withdrew at 14:10 leaving 17 dead; U.S. losses were one killed. At 13:55 a mechanized unit of the 1st Brigade, 25th Infantry Division engaged an enemy force 9 miles (14 km) northeast of Go Dau Ha killing 12. An OH-6 was shot down in Bình Dương Province. On 29 August at 14:00 a unit of the 1st Brigade, 1st Cavalry Division engaged an enemy platoon 10 miles (16 km) southeast of Katum, the enemy withdrew at 14:35 with unknown losses; U.S. losses were two killed. At 15:55 a unit of the 3rd Brigade, 9th Infantry Division found the bodies of nine PAVN/VC 7 miles (11 km) north of Tân An, all had been killed by airstrikes three days previously. At 16:10 a unit of the 3rd Brigade, 9th Infantry Division found a munitions cache 7 miles northeast of Tân An containing 24 RPG rounds among other supplies.

On 30 August at 16:45 a reconnaissance patrol by a unit of the 1st Infantry Division and the ARVN 8th Regiment, 5th Infantry Division engaged 15 PAVN/VC 6 miles (9.7 km) northeast of Lai Khê. The enemy withdrew at 18:40 leaving two dead and one individual weapon; U.S. losses were one killed. At 21:45 a base 4 miles (6.4 km) south of Sông Bé received mortar fire, artillery, helicopter gunship and AC-47 fire was directed onto the firing position and a search of the area found ten PAVN/VC dead. On 31 August at 09:55 a unit of the 1st Brigade, 1st Cavalry Division received fire from an entrenched PAVN force 6 miles south of Katum. Artillery, helicopter gunships and airstrikes hit the bunkers and the PAVN withdrew at 11:15 leaving three dead; U.S. losses were two killed. At 10:4 an OH-6 of the 12th Combat Aviation Group received ground fire 24 miles (39 km) north of Xuân Lộc and called in artillery and airstrikes, 14 dead PAVN/VC were later observed in the strike area. At 13:45 a U.S. Navy PBR engaged seven PAVN/VC on a riverbank 5 miles (8.0 km) west of Bến Cát, killing four and capturing three. At 15:20 a unit of the 1st Brigade, 1st Cavalry Division engaged another entrenched PAVN force 6 miles south of Katum. Artillery and airstrikes were directed against the bunkers and the PAVN withdrew at 16:10 leaving 25 dead, two light machineguns and 15 RPG rounds; U.S. losses were two killed.

Cumulative operational results to the end of August were 24,899 PAVN/VC killed, 3,319 captured and 6,243 individual and 1,544 crew-served weapons captured. U.S. losses were 1,451 killed.

=== September ===
On 1 September at 13:00 helicopter gunships of the 11th ACR attacked PAVN/VC in a bunker complex 12 miles (19 km) northwest of An Lộc and called in airstrikes, following the attacked 16 dead were observed amongst 72 destroyed bunkers and a 4-ton rice cache. At 13:45 helicopter gunships of the 1st Brigade, 1st Cavalry Division observed two PAVN soldiers setting up rockets 12 miles north of Dầu Tiếng. The gunships attacked the position and called in artillery fire which resulted in five secondary explosions and 16 dead PAVN were seen in the strike area. On 2 September at 13:20 a unit of the 1st Brigade, 1st Cavalry Division received fire 6 miles (9.7 km) south of Katum, supporting fires were called in and the enemy withdrew ten minutes later leaving 12 dead, 50 grenades and a field telephone; U.S. losses were two killed. At 16:30 a unit of the 11th ACR found the bodies of 16 PAVN/VC 4 miles (6.4 km) southwest of An Lộc, they had apparently been killed two weeks earlier.

On 3 September at 13:20 armored cavalry of the 1st Brigade, 25th Infantry Division observed 19 PAVN/VC 5 miles (8.0 km) northeast of Tây Ninh and engaged them with tank and .50 cal fire killing 18. At 14:50 an observation helicopter of the 1st Cavalry Division received fire 4 miles (6.4 km) southeast of Katum and directed artillery and helicopter gunship fire onto the area, seven PAVN/VC dead were seen in the strike area. At 15:25 an armored unit of the 25th Infantry Division engaged nine PAVN/VC 6 miles (9.7 km) northeast of Tây Ninh killing all nine and capturing one individual weapon. At 22:20 a U.S. Navy PBR engaged sampans 11 miles (18 km) east of Tân An killing four PAVN/VC. At 22:25 a unit of the 3rd Brigade, 9th Infantry Division ambushed a sampan carrying five PAVN/VC 12 miles (19 km) east of Tân An killing all five and capturing two AK-47s. A UH-1 was shot down 8 miles (13 km) northeast of Quản Lợi killing all seven on board. On 4 September at 14:45 mechanized infantry of the 1st Brigade, 25th Infantry Division engaged an enemy force 18 miles (29 km) southeast of Tây Ninh, the enemy withdrew at 18:30 leaving 15 dead; U.S. losses were one killed.

On 5 September at 01:00 a mechanized infantry unit of the 3rd Brigade, 1st Infantry Division in a night defensive position 14 miles (23 km) south of An Lộc received mortar fire followed by a ground attack by a PAVN unit of the 9th Division. The defenders were supported by artillery, helicopter gunship and AC-47 fire and the PAVN withdrew leaving 19 dead and one captured; U.S. losses were one killed. At 02:15 a unit of the 1st Brigade, 1st Cavalry Division in night defense at a landing zone 15 miles (24 km) north-northeast of Tây Ninh was hit by 20 rounds of 107 mm rocket fire followed by a ground assault. The enemy withdrew at 03:10 leaving 37 dead and one captured; U.S. losses were one killed. At 02:25 a firebase occupied by the ARVN 49th Regiment, 25th Division and a unit of the 3rd Brigade, 25th Infantry Division 6 miles (9.7 km) southwest of Go Dau Ha was hit by mortar fire followed by a ground attack. The attackers withdrew at 04:40 leaving 13 dead and two individual and four crew-served weapons, 28 RPG rounds and a radio; U.S. losses were one killed. At 03:45 a night defensive position of a mechanized infantry unit of the 1st Brigade, 25th Infantry Division and ARVN Airborne troops 9 miles (14 km) northeast of Go Dau Ha was hit by mortar fire followed by a ground attack. The attackers withdrew at 04:00 leaving eight dead; U.S. losses were two killed. At 06:30 an armored unit of the 25th Infantry Division operating 6 miles northeast of Tây Ninh received 15 rounds of 60 mm mortar fire, artillery and helicopter gunship fire was directed onto the firing position and 13 dead PAVN/VC were later found in the strike area. At 09:10 a mechanized unit of the 1st Brigade, 25th Infantry Division engaged an enemy unit 9 miles northeast of Tây Ninh, the enemy withdrew at 15:00 leaving 30 dead; U.S. losses were one killed. At 13:35 a unit of the 1st Brigade, 1st Cavalry Division engaged an enemy squad in bunkers 7 miles (11 km) north-northwest of Phú Cường, the enemy withdrew at 17:00 leaving ten dead and one captured; U.S. losses were one killed. At 14:00 a unit of the 199th LIB engaged an enemy company 12 miles (19 km) west-southwest of Xuân Lộc, the enemy withdrew at 20:10 leaving four dead; U.S. losses were seven killed. At 15:55 a unit of the 11th ACR was attacked by a PAVN force 2 miles (3.2 km) north of Lộc Ninh, the PAVN withdrew 20 minutes later leaving 12 dead and three individual and two crew-served weapons. At 16:00 mechanized infantry from the 11th ACR engaged an enemy company 1 mile (1.6 km) northwest of An Lộc, the enemy withdrew at 18:30 leaving 63 dead; U.S. losses were two killed. At 19:15 a unit of the 2nd Brigade, 25th Infantry Division ambushed 30 PAVN/VC 6 miles north of Củ Chi killing five and capturing one individual weapon. At 23:00 a mechanized unit of the 2nd Brigade, 25th Infantry Division at a firebase 3 miles (4.8 km) east-southeast of Trảng Bàng detected 12 PAVN/VC outside their perimeter and directed artillery fire onto the area killing six. A UH-1 was shot down 16 miles (26 km) north-northeast of Tây Ninh killing one on board.

On 6 September at 03:10 a unit of the 1st Brigade, 1st Cavalry Division at a landing zone 12 miles (19 km) northeast of Phú Cường detected movement outside their perimeter and directed artillery fire on the area. The landing zone then received mortar fire followed by ground probes. At 05:15 enemy sappers were seen in the perimeter wire and engaged by small arms, artillery, helicopter gunship and AC-119 fire. The enemy withdrew at 06:45 leaving 24 dead and one captured and one individual and two crew-served weapons; U.S. losses were three killed. At 09:50 a unit of the 11th ACR received fire from a PAVN force 3 miles (4.8 km) west of Lộc Ninh. The unit was supported by artillery, helicopter gunships and airstrikes and a unit of the ARVN 9th Regiment, 5th Division joined the battle. The PAVN withdrew at 15:15 leaving 70 dead and five captured, U.S. losses were three killed. At 10:55 a unit of the 1st Infantry Division escorting a convoy on Highway 13 was ambushed by a PAVN unit from the 1st Division 12 miles (19 km) south of An Lộc. Supporting fires were called in and the PAVN withdrew leaving 55 dead and four captured and eight AK-47s, three light machineguns, one RPG-2 launcher and one RPG-7 launcher and assorted munitions; U.S. losses were one killed. At 14:15 mechanized infantry of the 1st Brigade, 25th Infantry Division were engaged received fire 7 miles (11 km) northeast of Tây Ninh, the enemy withdrew at 15:20 leaving 27 dead. At 20:50 a unit of the 11th ACR in a night defensive position 4 miles (6.4 km) south-southwest of An Lộc received a ground probe, the enemy withdrew after 30 minutes leaving 26 dead and four AK-47s and one light machinegun. At 23:00 a U.S. Navy PBR engaged a group of PAVN/VC attempting to cross the Saigon River 7 miles (11 km) south-southeast of Dầu Tiếng killing 12. An OH-6 was shot down in Bình Dương Province.

On 7 September at 08:35 air cavalry of the armored squadron of the 1st Infantry Division air-assaulted into an area 3 miles (4.8 km) southeast of Bến Cát where they engaged an entrenched enemy force. The enemy withdrew at midday leaving three dead and three individual weapons. At 09:20 mechanized infantry from the 1st Brigade, 25th Infantry Division engaged an entrenched enemy position 9 miles (14 km) northeast of Go Dau Ha, the enemy withdrew at 15:50 leaving 26 dead. At 09:25 a unit of the 3rd Brigade, 1st Cavalry Division engaged an enemy force 4 miles (6.4 km) northwest of Quản Lợi, the enemy withdrew at 12:00 leaving 12 dead and two 12.7mm machineguns. At 12:50 a unit of the 2nd Brigade, 25th Infantry Division operating 10 miles (16 km) southwest of Bến Cát found 11 PAVN/VC dead in a tunnel complex, all had been killed by artillery fire in the preceding two days. At 15:15 a unit of the 11th ACR engaged a PAVN battalion 3 miles southwest of An Lộc, fighting continued until the PAVN withdrew at 19:10 leaving 42 dead and one individual weapon and two machineguns; U.S. losses were two killed. At 15:50 an AH-1 of the 11th ACR received machinegun fire 6 miles (9.7 km) northeast of Lộc Ninh and engaged the firing position killing 15 PAVN/VC. At 22:30 mechanized infantry of the 2nd Brigade, 25th Infantry Division detected PAVN/VC outside their perimeter and directed artillery fire onto the area killing five. At 02:40 further movement was detected and artillery fire called in killing another five PAVN/VC. A UH-1 was shot down 4 miles southwest of An Lộc killing two on board.

On 8 September at 12:35 a unit of the 2nd Brigade, 25th Infantry Division received fire 5 miles (8.0 km) southwest of Trảng Bàng, the unit returned fire and the enemy withdrew with unknown losses. At 20:15 a unit of the 1st Cavalry Division in a night defensive position 5 miles (8.0 km) northwest of An Lộc received mortar fire. At 21:35 further mortar fire was followed by a ground probe, the unit returned fire and directed artillery onto the direction of attack and the enemy withdrew with unknown losses. On 9 September at 01:30 mechanized infantry of the 1st Infantry Division at a firebase 7 miles (11 km) east of Lai Khê was attacked, the enemy withdrew after twenty minutes with unknown losses; U.S. losses were one killed. At 09:15 an OH-6 and an AH-1 from the 1/9th Cavalry were hit by ground fire 6 miles (9.7 km) northeast of Sông Bé. The OH-6 crashed and the AH-1 engaged enemy force around the crash site until it was forced to crash-land. The aerorifle platoon was landed at the site and rescued the crews and damaged helicopters.

On 10 September at 09:30 a unit of the 11th ACR operating 4 miles (6.4 km) southwest of An Lộc found the bodies of 22 PAVN in a bunker complex killed three days previously, they also captured one wounded PAVN soldier. At 10:25 a helicopter gunship from the 1st Brigade, 1st Cavalry Division received machinegun fire 5 miles (8.0 km) south-southeast of Katum, the gunship engaged the firing position and called in artillery and five dead PAVN/VC were seen in the strike area. At 10:45 an OH-6 from the 1/9th Cavalry received fire 8 miles (13 km) southeast of Phước Bình, the helicopter engaged the firing position and called in artillery and the bodies of ten PAVN/VC were seen in the strike area. At 14:00 an OH-6 and an AH-1 of the 1/9th Cavalry received fire 3 miles (4.8 km) north-northwest of Katum and engaged the firing position killing ten PAVN/VC. At 20:40 a patrol from the 2nd Brigade, 1st Infantry Division was ambushed by an enemy squad 3 miles (4.8 km) southwest of Phú Cường, the enemy withdrew after 20 minutes leaving one dead and one captured and two AK-47s and one pistol; U.S. losses were three killed.

On 11 September at 02:05 a unit of the 11th ACR in a night defensive position 5 miles (8.0 km) southwest of An Lộc received mortar fire and then RPG fire, the enemy withdrew after 10 minutes with unknown losses while U.S. losses were two killed. At 04:05 Phước Vĩnh Base Camp received rocket fire and at 05:15 12 PAVN probed the perimeter, withdrawing ten minutes later leaving four dead and two individual and two crew-served weapons. At 09:50 mechanized infantry from the 25th Infantry Division and a unit of ARVN Airborne engaged an enemy unit 2 miles (3.2 km) west-southwest of Phú Cường, supporting fires were provided and the battle continued until 15:05 when the enemy withdrew leaving 46 dead; U.S. losses were two killed. At 10:25 a unit of the 11th ACR was attacked 3 miles (4.8 km) west of Lộc Ninh, the enemy withdrew at 11:50 leaving nine dead. At 13:40 a unit of the 1st Brigade, 1st Infantry Division engaged an enemy force 6 miles (9.7 km) southeast of Dầu Tiếng. During the fighting a light observation helicopter was shot down killing one crewman. The enemy withdrew at 16:20 leaving one dead, U.S. losses were two dead in total. At 14:45 a unit of the 2nd Brigade, 25th Infantry division patrolling 9 miles (14 km) northeast of Trảng Bàng found 23 PAVN/VC graves, all had died in the previous day. At 15:10 a unit of the 11th ACR engaged an enemy force 2 miles northwest of Lộc Ninh, supporting fires were provided and the enemy withdrew at 16:20 leaving 17 dead. An OH-6 was shot down 7 miles (11 km) southwest of Minh Thanh in Tây Ninh Province killing one crewman.

On 12 September at 10:00 helicopter gunships of the 12th Combat Aviation Group engaged eight PAVN/VC 2 miles (3.2 km) northeast of Trảng Bàng, a later search by the 2nd Brigade, 25th Infantry Division found eight bodies and three AK-47s. At 16:50 mechanized infantry of the 1st Brigade, 25th Infantry Division and RF troops operating 9 miles (14 km) northeast of Go Dau Ha found a weapons cache containing 53 SKS, 14 AK-47, three light machineguns and an 82 mm mortar.

On 13 September at 10:30 mechanized infantry of the 1st Brigade, 25th Infantry Division and a unit of the ARVN 7th Airborne Battalion operating 7 miles (11 km) northeast of Tây Ninh engaged an enemy force. The enemy withdrew at 15:50 leaving 12 dead and two individual and one crew-served weapon. At 14:20 helicopter gunships from the 3rd Brigade, 9th Infantry Division received fire 6 miles (9.7 km) southwest of Phú Cường and attacked the firing site killing seven PAVN/VC and destroying three bunkers. At 15:20 a unit of the 1st Brigade, 1st Cavalry Division engaged an enemy force 15 miles (24 km) north-northeast of Tây Ninh killing 12 in a 25-minute firefight; U.S. losses were two killed. At 23:30 a firebase of the 1st Brigade, 1st Cavalry Division 16 miles (26 km) north-northeast of Tây Ninh was hit by 75-100 round of mortar, rocket and RPG fire. Artillery, helicopter gunship and AC-47 fire was directed onto the firing positions and a search of the area found 33 PAVN/VC dead and one captured together with seven individual and three crew-served weapons and five 107 mm rockets. A UH-1 was shot down 4 miles (6.4 km) south of Katum.

On 14 September at 07:00 a unit of the 11th ACR in a night defensive position 4 miles (6.4 km) northwest of Lộc Ninh received 15-20 rounds of mortar fire. At 12:25 the 1/9thCavalry engaged two enemy companies 4 miles (6.4 km) southeast of Sông Bé supported by artillery, helicopter gunships and airstrikes. The enemy withdrew after 40 minutes leaving 13 dead; U.S. losses were three killed, among them was Sergeant Donald Sidney Skidgel who would be posthumously awarded the Medal of Honor. At 15:40 soldiers from the 1st Infantry Division at Firebase Gela northwest of Lai Khê detonated an explosive device killing eight. At 21:15 U.S. Navy PBRs engaged PAVN on a sampan 6 miles (9.7 km) northeast of Tân An killing six.

On 15 September at 11:15 a unit of the 2nd Brigade, 1st Cavalry Division engaged an entrenched enemy force 7 miles (11 km) south-southeast of Phước Bình, the enemy withdrew at midday leaving seven dead. At 11:20 a unit of the 3rd Brigade, 9th Infantry Division engaged 8 PAVN/VC 17 miles (27 km) east of Xuân Lộc killing seven in an hourlong firefight. At 15:30 helicopter gunships of the 12th Combat Aviation Group attacked an enemy squad 7 miles north of Củ Chi and directed artillery fire onto the position. Six secondary explosions occurred; 38 dead PAVN/VC were seen in the strike area among eight destroyed structures. At 17:30 a unit of the 1st Brigade, 1st Infantry Division engaged an enemy squad 11 miles (18 km) west of Lai Khê killing 15 in a 30-minute skirmish; U.S. losses were one killed. At 20:00 a unit of the 3rd Brigade, 9th Infantry Division ambushed an enemy force 6 miles (9.7 km) west of Rach Kien, the enemy withdrew after 20 minutes leaving ten dead and two AK-47s and one light machinegun.

On 16 September at 00:15 a unit of the 1st Brigade, 1st Cavalry Division in a night defensive position 8 miles (13 km) north of Phú Cường saw three PAVN/VC in the perimeter wire and fired on them, a search of the area at dawn found seven dead. At 08:30 a unit of the 3rd Brigade, 9th infantry Division and a unit of the ARVN 50th Regiment, 25th Division engaged an enemy squad 6 miles (9.7 km) southeast of Tân An. The enemy withdrew at 10:15 leaving 14 dead, five individual weapons, one 60 mm mortar and one RPG launcher. At 13:15 a unit of the 2nd Brigade, 25th Infantry Division and a unit of the ARVN 49th Regiment, 25th Division engaged an enemy force 8 miles northeast of Trảng Bàng, supported by artillery, helicopter gunships and airstrikes. The enemy withdrew at 16:00 leaving 36 dead and 15 AK-47s. At 16:30 a unit of the 2nd Brigade, 1st Cavalry Division found the bodies of nine PAVN killed by airstrikes the previous day 6 miles south of Phước Bình. At 21:45 a patrol of the 3rd Brigade, 82nd Airborne Division ambushed a PAVN platoon 8 miles southwest of Bến Cát killing one and capturing one individual weapon.

On 17 September at 07:30 a unit of the 3rd Brigade, 9th Infantry Division engaged an enemy force 9 miles (14 km) northeast of Tân An supported by artillery and helicopter gunships. The enemy withdrew at 13:30 leaving 18 dead and one individual weapon. During the fighting a UH-1 Command and Control helicopter and an AH-1 collided and both crashed killing all ten personnel on the UH-1 including the 3rd Brigade commander Colonel Dale Crittenberger and the commanding officer of the 5th Battalion, 60th Infantry Regiment, Lieutenant colonel Leo Sikorski. Both crewmen of the AH-1 were also killed. At 09:20 a unit of the 1st Brigade, 1st Cavalry Division engaged an enemy force 21 miles (34 km) northeast of Tây Ninh, the enemy withdrew leaving one dead and one individual weapon; U.S. losses were one killed. At 10:10 Army and Navy helicopter gunships attacked an enemy force 5 miles (8.0 km) southwest of Phú Mỹ killing 12. At 13:25 helicopters of the 1st Brigade, 1st cavalry Division received fire while approaching a landing zone 12 miles (19 km) northeast of Phú Cường, artillery fire and airstrikes were directed onto the area and troops were landed finding ten PAVN dead. At 19:50 a unit of the 2nd Brigade, 1st Infantry Division engaged an enemy force 9 miles east of Lai Khê, the enemy withdrew an hour later leaving ten dead and one captured and four individual weapons.

On 18 September at 07:00 a unit of the 1st Brigade, 1st Cavalry Division engaged an enemy unit 15 miles (24 km) northeast of Tây Ninh killing six and capturing one individual and one crew-served weapon. At 09:50 Rangers of the 1st Cavalry Division engaged three PAVN/VC 9 miles (14 km) north of Phước Vĩnh, the PAVN/VC withdrew pursued by the Rangers and the aerorifle platoon of the 1/9th Cavalry was landed to engage a bunker complex. The PAVN/VC withdrew leaving one dead and a munitions cache was found in the bunkers; U.S. losses were one killed. At 15:00 a unit of the 3rd Brigade, 9th Infantry Division found the bodies of 12 PAVN/VC 8 miles (13 km) east-northeast of Tân An, all had been killed by artillery within the preceding two days. At 19:10 a unit of the 1st Brigade, 1st Cavalry Division in a night defensive position 19 miles (31 km) north-northeast of Tây Ninh received mortar fire followed by a ground probe, the defenders returned fire supported by artillery, helicopter gunship and AC-119 fire and the PAVN withdrew at 20:20 leaving 25 dead.

On 19 September at 10:40 mechanized infantry of the 2nd Brigade, 25th Infantry Division engaged two enemy platoons 3 miles (4.8 km) north of Củ Chi, supported by artillery, helicopter gunships and airstrikes. The enemy withdrew at 16:10 leaving 20 dead and two captured. At 11:00 helicopters of the armored cavalry squadron of the 1st Infantry Division found an enemy base camp 9 miles (14 km) southeast of Dầu Tiếng and directed artillery and airstrikes onto the base killing seven PAVN/VC. At 12:40 a unit of the 1st Brigade, 1st Infantry Division air-assaulted into a landing zone 6 miles (9.7 km) west-northwest of Bến Cát, ten PAVN/VC were seen in the area and helicopter gunships attacked them and the unit found six dead and captured two and two individual weapons. At 13:45 mechanized infantry from the 3rd Brigade, 9th Infantry Division found 11 PAVN/VC dead 7 miles (11 km) southeast of Tân An, all had been killed by small arms fire three days earlier. At 16:55 a helicopter from the 1/9th Cavalry received fire 12 miles (19 km) southeast of Katum and returned fire and directed artillery fire onto the position, six dead and one destroyed machinegun were seen in the strike area.

On 20 September at 11:35 mechanized infantry of the 1st Brigade, 25th Infantry Division and an RF company found a weapons cache 9 miles (14 km) northeast of Go Dau Ha containing eight AK-47s, 12 rifles two RPG launchers and assorted medical supplies. On 21 September at 11:20 a unit of the 1st Brigade, 25th Infantry Division engaged an enemy squad 17 miles (27 km) west-northwest of Tây Ninh, killing eight in an hourlong fight. At 11:25 a unit of the 1st Brigade, 25th Infantry Division engaged an enemy platoon 10 miles (16 km) west-southwest of Tây Ninh, killing six in a 45-minute skirmish. At 12:55 a Ranger unit engaged a PAVN force 13 miles (21 km) southwest of Sông Bé supported by artillery and helicopter gunships and later by the aerorifle company of the 1/9th Cavalry. The enemy withdrew at 16:30 leaving 14 dead. At 14:00 a unit of the 2nd Brigade, 25th Infantry Division engaged seven PAVN/VC in bunkers 3 miles (4.8 km) northeast of Trảng Bàng killing five and capturing two.

On 22 September at 00:15 U.S. Navy PBRs and a unit of the 1st Brigade, 1st Infantry Division supported by artillery and helicopter gunships engaged 30 PAVN/VC crossing the Saigon River 9 miles (14 km) southeast of Dầu Tiếng killing 25 and capturing one individual weapon. At 08:25 a unit of the 199th LIB engage an enemy force 4 miles (6.4 km) north-northwest of Xuân Lộc with unknown results. At 18:45 an OH-6 of the 1/9th Cavalry received fire 12 miles (19 km) southeast of Katum and returned fire and called in artillery and then observed 11 dead in the strike area. Thirty minutes later other helicopters received fire in the same area and called in further artillery strikes killing another five PAVN/VC. At 21:00 U.S. Navy PBRs engaged enemy troops crossing the Saigon River 6 miles (9.7 km) south of Dầu Tiếng killing 17.

On 23 September at 02:15 a unit of the 2nd Brigade, 25th Infantry Division at a patrol base 3 miles (4.8 km) east of Trảng Bàng observed ten PAVN/VC in the perimeter and directed artillery fire onto the position killing nine. At 10:00 a helicopter of the 1/9th Cavalry received fire 9 miles (14 km) southeast of Katum and directed airstrikes onto the area, seven PAVN/VC dead were seen in the strike area. At 11:00 a unit of the 3rd Brigade, 82nd Airborne Division supported by helicopter gunships engaged an enemy force 2 miles (3.2 km) south of Đức Hòa killing five and capturing one and one AK-47. At 12:30 an armored unit of the 25th Infantry Division engaged an enemy force 2 miles west of Phú Cường supported by airstrikes, the enemy withdrew after an hour leaving 11 dead and seven AK-47s. At 15:50 a unit of the 199th LIB was ambushed 5 miles (8.0 km) north-northwest of Xuân Lộc losing five killed in a 25-minute skirmish. At 19:20 a U.S. Navy PBR attacked enemy forces crossing the Saigon River 8 miles (13 km) southeast of Dầu Tiếng killing five. At 22:45 in the same area a PBR killed a further nine PAVN/VC crossing the river.

On 24 September at 03:00 helicopter gunships of the 1st Infantry Division engaged six PAVN/VC 9 miles (14 km) east of Bến Cát killing five. At 04:45 mechanized infantry of the 2nd Brigade, 25th Infantry Division and ARVN armored cavalry and infantry from the 49th Regiment, 25th Division in a night defensive position 9 miles north-northeast of Củ Chi received a ground probe. The units responded with their weapons supported by helicopter gunships and an AC-47. The enemy withdrew at 05:05 leaving ten dead and four AK-47s. At 09:10 a unit of the 3rd Brigade, 1st Cavalry Division found a six-ton rice cache 11 miles (18 km) west-northwest of Quản Lợi. At 10:30 a unit of the 1st Brigade, 1st Cavalry Division supported by helicopter gunships and airstrikes engaged an enemy unit 15 miles (24 km) east-northeast of Tây Ninh. One airstrike caused a massive secondary explosion resulting in a 1,600 feet (490 m) smoke column. The enemy withdrew at 11:00 leaving 24 dead and a large munitions cache including 75 107 mm rockets and 25 antitank mines. At 16:00 a unit of the 2nd Brigade, 1st Infantry Division was ambushed 4 miles (6.4 km) southwest of Phước Vĩnh killing two. At 17:40 an observation helicopter of the 1/9th Cavalry drew fire 20 miles (32 km) northeast of Sông Bé and directed airstrikes and an AC-119 onto the area, the bodies of eight PAVN/VC were seen among 15 destroyed bunkers in the strike area. At 21:05 a unit of the 2nd Brigade, 25th Infantry Division detected ten PAVN/VC on their perimeter and directed artillery fire onto the area killing seven. At 22:40 a unit of the 2nd Brigade, 25th Infantry Division engaged 25 PAVN/VC 9 miles southwest of Bến Cát, the enemy withdrew at 01:30 leaving 16 dead. At 23:25 a unit of the 2nd Brigade, 25th Infantry Division killed five PAVN/VC 3 miles (4.8 km) northeast of Trảng Bàng. An OH-6 was shot down 10 miles (16 km) east of Phước Bình.

On 25 September at 22:50 a unit of the 2nd Brigade, 25th Infantry Division detected 15 PAVN/VC near their night defensive position 6 miles (9.7 km) northeast of Trảng Bàng, artillery fire was directed onto the area and 20 bodies were seen in the strike area. On 26 September at 04:4 an ambush patrol of the 1st Brigade, 25th Infantry Division engaged an enemy force 6 miles (9.7 km) northwest of Go Dau Ha. The enemy withdrew at 05:55 leaving 13 dead and one captured and one individual weapon. At 07:10 helicopter gunships from the 1/9th Cavalry received fire from an enemy force 23 miles (37 km) north-northeast of Tây Ninh and directed artillery and airstrikes on the area, eight PAVN/VC dead were seen in the strike area. At 11:10 a unit of the 2nd Brigade, 1st Cavalry Division engaged an enemy force 9 miles (14 km) northeast of Go Dau Ha supported by artillery, helicopter gunships and airstrikes. The enemy withdrew at 16:20 leaving 30 dead and ten individual weapons; U.S. losses were one killed. At midday a unit of the 3rd Brigade, 82nd Airborne Division supported by helicopter gunship engaged 20 PAVN/VC 5 miles (8.0 km) south of Đức Hòa killing 16; U.S. losses were two killed. At 15:45 a unit of the 3rd Brigade, 9th Infantry Division supported by helicopter gunships engaged an enemy force 12 miles (19 km) east of Tân An. The enemy withdrew at 17:50 leaving 26 dead and three individual weapons. At 18:00 a unit of the 199th LIB found seven PAVN/VC bodies 17 miles (27 km) north-northeast of Xuân Lộc, all had been killed by airstrikes a week earlier.

On 27 September at 18:30 mechanized infantry of the 1st Brigade, 25th Infantry Division operating 9 miles (14 km) northeast of Go Dau Ha directed artillery fire onto five PAVN/VC, killing all five. On 28 September at 00:30 a unit of the 2nd Brigade, 25th Infantry Division in a night defensive position 9 miles northwest of Củ Chi detected 20 PAVN/VC moving towards them and directed artillery fire onto the area killing ten. At 14:45 a unit of the 2nd Brigade, 25th Infantry Division patrolling 6 miles (9.7 km) north of Củ Chi found ten PAVN/VC killed by airstrikes in the preceding days. At 16:40 a unit of the 1st Brigade, 1st Cavalry Division engage an enemy platoon 16 miles (26 km) northeast of Tây Ninh, the enemy withdrew at 19:45 leaving six dead; U.S. losses were one killed.

On 29 September at 11:35 a unit of the 3rd Brigade, 1st Cavalry Division was attacked 12 miles (19 km) southwest of Phước Bình losing one killed. At 11:55 a unit of the 1st Brigade, 25th Infantry Division engaged 25 PAVN/VC 11 miles (18 km) south-southeast of Tây Ninh killing six. At 13:50 Rangers from the 1st Cavalry Division observed 30 PAVN/VC 7 miles (11 km) north of Sông Bé and directed helicopter gunships onto the location which killed ten. At 15:00 a Chieu hoi led mechanized infantry from the 3rd Brigade, 1st Infantry Division to a weapons cache 7 miles (11 km) northeast of Lai Khê, containing 24 light machineguns, two 82 mm mortars and assorted munitions. At 16:10 a unit of the 1st brigade, 1st cavalry Division operating 16 miles (26 km) northeast of Tây Ninh found ten PAVN/VC killed by airstrikes earlier that day. At 17:30 1/9th Cavalry troops were landed 12 miles (19 km) southwest of Katum killing two PAVN/VC in a brief skirmish and then finding five PAVN/VC killed by airstrikes earlier. At 21:00mechanized infantry of the 1st Brigade, 25th Infantry Division detected 20 PAVN/VC outside their perimeter 11 miles northwest of Tây Ninh and directed artillery fire onto the area, seven dead were seen in the strike area. On 30 September at 02:25 a unit of the 1st Brigade, 1st Infantry Division at Firebase Canada 4 miles (6.4 km) east of Dầu Tiếng observed nine PAVN/VC outside their perimeter and engaged them with unit weapons, the enemy withdrew at 03:15 with unknown losses. At 09:50 mechanized infantry of the 3rd Brigade, 1st Infantry Division were led to a weapons cache 5 miles (8.0 km) southwest of Phước Vĩnh containing a 60 mm mortar and 12 RPG rounds.

Cumulative operational results to the end of September were 28,535 PAVN/VC killed, 4,077 captured and 7,180 individual and 1,684 crew-served weapons captured. U.S. losses were 1,605 killed.

=== October ===
On 1 October at 13:35 a unit of the 1st Brigade, 1st Cavalry Division engaged an enemy platoon 30 miles (48 km) northeast of Tây Ninh and directed airstrikes onto the area, seven PAVN/VC dead were seen in the strike area. On 2 October at 05:00 a unit of the 2nd Brigade, 25th Infantry Division in a night defensive position 6 miles (9.7 km) northeast of Trảng Bàng engaged an enemy force killing ten and capturing four individual weapons. At 12:30 a unit of the 1st Brigade, 1st Infantry Division engaged an enemy company 6 miles southeast of Dầu Tiếng, the enemy withdrew at 18:45 leaving nine dead; U.S. losses were three killed. At 16:00 a unit of the 3rd Brigade, 1st Cavalry Division found a food cache 11 miles (18 km) east-northeast of Lộc Ninh.

On 3 October at 07:20 a unit of the 3rd Brigade, 82nd Airborne Division received mortar fire 6 miles (9.7 km) south of Bến Cát, the unit returned fire and called in artillery, helicopter gunship and airstrikes on the firing position. At 10:30 the enemy withdrew leaving 14 dead. Two observation helicopters were hit by ground fire with one crashing; U.S. losses were one killed. On 4 October at 08:55 a unit of the armored cavalry squadron of the 1st Infantry Division and RF forces engaged an entrenched enemy force 4 miles (6.4 km) north of Phú Cường, the enemy withdrew after 20 minutes leaving six dead and three crew-served weapons. At 11:20 a unit of the 3rd Brigade, 9th Infantry Division engaged an enemy force 3 miles (4.8 km) south-southeast of Đức Hòa, the enemy withdrew leaving five dead and three individual weapons. At 13:50 a unit of the 1st Brigade, 1st Cavalry Division found a weapons cache 20 miles (32 km) northeast of Tây Ninh containing 37 107 mm rockets. At 15:55 troops from the 1/9th Cavalry engaged an enemy company 11 miles (18 km) northeast of Lộc Ninh, artillery, helicopter gunship and air support was provided and the enemy withdrew at 16:20 leaving 24 dead. At 16:00 a unit of the 2nd Brigade, 25th Infantry Division engaged six PAVN/VC 8 miles (13 km) west of Trảng Bàng killing all six. At 16:50 a unit of the 2nd Brigade, 1st Cavalry Division operating 4 miles southeast of Sông Bé found the bodies of seven PAVN/VC killed a week earlier.

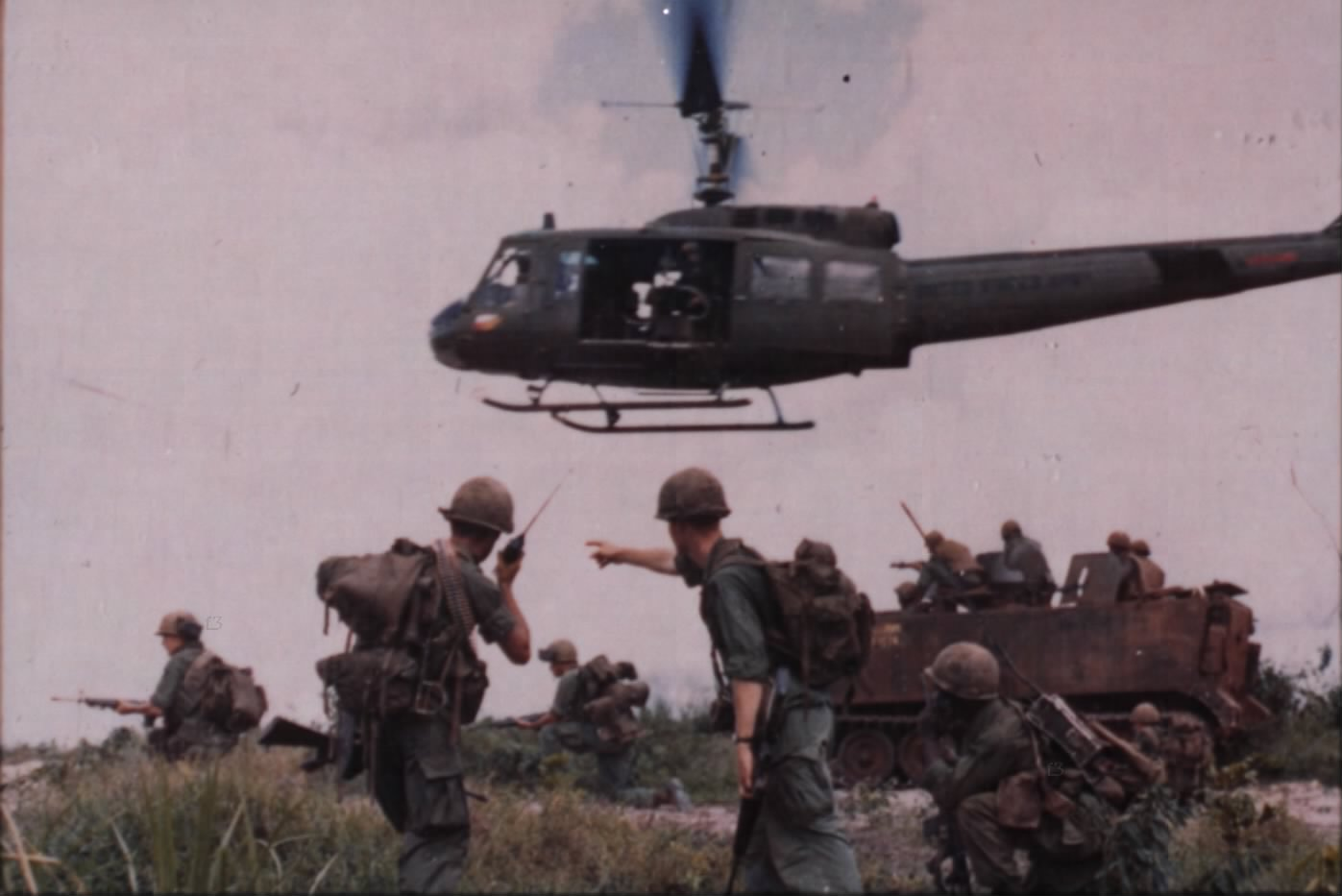
Men of Company "D", 2nd Battalion, 3rd Infantry deploy near Long Binh, 6 October

On 5 October at 11:15 a unit of the 2nd Brigade, 25th Infantry Division operating 6 miles (9.7 km) east of Trảng Bàng engaged an enemy force killing eight and capturing three and three individual and two crew-served weapons. At 13:00 a unit of the 2nd Brigade, 25th Infantry Division engage an enemy force 7 miles (11 km) north of Trảng Bàng, the enemy withdrew an hour later leaving nine dead and one captured. At 15:45 a unit of the 3rd Brigade, 1st Cavalry Division and troops from the 1/9th Cavalry engaged 20–30 enemy soldiers 11 miles (18 km) northeast of Lộc Ninh, the enemy withdrew after ten minutes leaving five dead; U.S. losses were one killed. At 20:30 a unit of the 2nd Brigade, 25th Infantry Division supported by artillery and helicopter gunships engaged 20 PAVN/VC 6 miles northeast of Trảng Bàng, the enemy withdrew at 23:00 leaving 15 dead. On 6 October at 00:30 a unit of the 1st Brigade, 25th Infantry Division engaged 6–8 PAVN/VC 5 miles (8.0 km) northeast of Tây Ninh killing five. At 10:55 a unit of the 1st Brigade, 1st Cavalry Division operating 16 miles (26 km) north of Tây Ninh engaged an enemy squad, the enemy withdrew at 16:00 leaving 12 dead; U.S. losses were one killed. At 17:30 helicopters of the 1/9th Cavalry killed seven PAVN/VC 19 miles (31 km) west-northwest of Sông Bé.

On 7 October at 17:45 a light observation helicopter of the 1/9th Cavalry received fire 10 miles (16 km) southeast of Katum and directed helicopter gunships onto the site, seven dead PAVN/VC were seen in the strike area. At 18:10 another helicopter received fire 6 miles (9.7 km) southwest of Katum. Helicopter gunships and airstrikes attacked the area and six PAVN/VC dead were seen in the strike area. At 18:15 a light observation helicopter of the 1/9th Cavalry received fire 9 miles (14 km) west of Sông Bé and directed artillery fire onto the location, seven dead PAVN/VC were seen in the strike area. At 19:45 a reconnaissance unit of the 3rd Brigade, 9th Infantry Division and a U.S. Navy PBR engaged an enemy force on the Vàm Cỏ Đông River, 3 miles (4.8 km) northwest of Bến Lức, the enemy withdrew at 21:30 leaving five dead.

On 8 October at 14:40 helicopter gunships from the 1/9th Cavalry engaged 11 PAVN/VC 11 miles (18 km) northeast of Lộc Ninh killing ten. At 19:25 a reconnaissance unit of the 3rd Brigade, 9th Infantry Division on U.S. Navy PBRs engaged an enemy force on the Vàm Cỏ Đông River 7 miles (11 km) east-northeast of Tân An killing five. An OH-6 was shot down in Biên Hòa Province. On 9 October at 10:10 troops from the 3rd Brigade, 82nd Airborne Division engage an entrenched enemy squad 4 miles (6.4 km) west of Phú Cường, the enemy withdrew at 12:50 leaving one dead and two individual weapons. At 18:20 a unit of the 199th LIB engaged an enemy force 9 miles (14 km) northwest of Xuân Lộc, the enemy withdrew after 20 minutes with unknown losses. At 18:30 helicopter gunships from the 1/9th Cavalry received fire 9 miles northeast of Lộc Ninh, the gunships engaged the firing position and directed artillery fire onto the area, five PAVN/VC dead were seen in the strike area. At 20:10 a unit from the 199th LIB ambushed 12 PAVN/VC 13 miles (21 km) east-northeast of Xuân Lộc killing six and capturing three individual weapons.

On 10 October at 15:20 an OH-6 of the 1/9th Cavalry drew fire 15 miles (24 km) west-northwest of Sông Bé and crash-landed. The aerorifle company was landed at the crash site and engaged enemy forces. A UH-1 was also shot down nearby. The enemy withdrew at 16:30 leaving 15 dead. At 16:40 a unit of the 3rd Brigade, 1st Cavalry Division operating 16 miles (26 km) west-northwest of Sông Bé found a munitions cache containing 81 120 mm mortar rounds and 80 82 mm mortar rounds. At 16:45 troops of the 1/9th Cavalry found a bunker complex and food cache 21 miles (34 km) northeast of Tây Ninh. At 17:00 a Ranger team of the 25th Infantry Division engaged an enemy squad 2 miles (3.2 km) northeast of Trảng Bàng killing five and capturing one individual weapon. At 19:30 helicopters of the 1/9th Cavalry attacked six PAVN/VC 11 miles (18 km) northwest of Lộc Ninh and also called in airstrikes, five dead were seen in the strike area.

On 11 October at 10:40 a unit of the 1st Brigade, 1st Cavalry Division engaged an enemy force 14 miles (23 km) north-northeast of Tây Ninh, the enemy withdrew after 40 minutes leaving five dead; U.S. losses were two killed. At 14:15 a unit of the 3rd Brigade, 1st Cavalry Division found a 4-ton rice cache 16 miles (26 km) west-northwest of Sông Bé. At 14:40 an armored unit of the 1st Brigade, 25th Infantry Division providing road security 9 miles (14 km) north-northeast of Tây Ninh was attacked by RPGs, the unit returned fire supported by artillery and helicopter gunships and the enemy withdrew 20 minutes later leaving two dead; U.S. losses were two killed. At 16:30 a unit of the 2nd Brigade, 25th Infantry Division engaged 20 PAVN/VC 6 miles (9.7 km) southwest of Bến Cát, the PAVN/VC withdrew after 45 minutes leaving six dead and two individual weapons; U.S. losses were one killed. At 17:10 a unit of the 3rd Brigade, 1st cavalry Division engaged an enemy squad 13 miles (21 km) west-southwest of Sông Bé, the enemy withdrew after 40 minutes with unknown losses; U.S. losses were one killed. At 20:45 a unit of the 3rd Brigade, 9th Infantry Division and U.S. Navy PBRs engaged an enemy force 8 miles (13 km) north of Tân An killing nine in a 15-minute skirmish.

On 12 October at 11:30 a unit of the 11th ACR operating 3 miles (4.8 km) west of Lộc Ninh engaged an enemy platoon killing five. At 16:00 a helicopter gunship from the 1/9th Cavalry received fire from 20 to 25 PAVN/VC 13 miles (21 km) southeast of Katum, the gunship returned fire and directed artillery and airstrikes onto the position, 14 dead were seen in the strike area. At 16:30 a USAF FAC observed an enemy unit 6 miles (9.7 km) northeast of Go Dau Ha and directed airstrikes on the location resulting in one secondary explosion. Air cavalry troops from the 25th Infantry Division later searched the area finding 19 PAVN/VC dead among five destroyed bunkers. At 23:25 infantry from the 3rd Brigade, 25th Infantry Division and RF troops engage an enemy squad 6 miles south-southwest of Go Dau Ha, the enemy withdrew after a few minutes leaving five dead and two individual weapons. A patrol from the brigade engaged a further four PAVN/VC killing three and capturing one. The prisoner stated that his unit was planning to attack a nearby brigade firebase. At 00:50 on 13 October the firebase was hit by mortar and rocket fire, the defenders returned fire supported by artillery, helicopter gunships and an AC-119. The enemy withdrew at 02:40 leaving two dead, one AK-47 and three RPG rounds.

On 13 October at 14:30 helicopter gunships from the 1st Infantry Division attacked an enemy base camp 9 miles (14 km) northeast of Dầu Tiếng and directed artillery and airstrikes onto the location, 18 dead PAVN/VC were seen in the strike area. At 18:00 helicopter gunships from the 1/9th Cavalry received fire 7 miles (11 km) east of Lộc Ninh, the gunships returned fire. Soon afterwards in the same area another gunship received fire and returned fire and directed artillery and airstrikes onto the location killing 12 PAVN/VC and destroying a bunker. At 23:55 a UH-1 from the 1st Cavalry Division received fire 9 miles (14 km) northwest of Phước Bình and directed artillery and AC-119 fire onto the area, the enemy withdrew at 02:15 and 28 dead were seen in the strike area.

On 14 October at 11:15 a helicopter of the 1/9th Cavalry attacked ten PAVN/VC 7 miles (11 km) west of Katum, killing nine. At 11:20 a light observation helicopter of the 1/9th Cavalry received fire 300m north of the earlier contact and returned fire and directed artillery fire onto the position killing five. On 15 October at 13:00 a USAF FAC saw 25 dead PAVN/VC and 19 destroyed bunkers 14 miles (23 km) west of Lai Khê, the result of airstrikes earlier. At 15:10 a unit of the 3rd Brigade, 1st cavalry Division found a weapons cache 9 miles (14 km) west of Phước Bình containing seven submachine guns and one AK-17.

On 16 October at 09:50 a unit of the 2nd Brigade, 25th Infantry Division operating 10 miles (16 km) northeast of Trảng Bàng found the bodies of seven PAVN/VC killed by artillery fire 12 hours earlier. At 13:00 a helicopter gunship of the 1/9th Cavalry engaged nine PAVN/VC 6 miles (9.7 km) east-southeast of Lộc Ninh killing all nine. At 20:30 a unit of the 1st Brigade, 1st Infantry Division on a U.S. Navy PBR engaged seven PAVN/VC on the Saigon River 7 miles (11 km) west of Bến Cát killing five and capturing one individual weapon. At 21:00 helicopter gunships from the 1st Infantry Division attacked an enemy force 9 miles (14 km) north-northeast of Go Dau Ha killing six, an hour later and one mile south helicopter gunships killed another five PAVN/VC. At 21:45 a patrol from the 1st Brigade, 25th Infantry Division engaged 30 PAVN/VC 6 miles northeast of Go Dau Ha, the enemy withdrew after 40 minutes leaving nine dead.

On 17 October at 07:10 a helicopter from the 1/9th Cavalry saw five dead PAVN/VC 6 miles (9.7 km) east-southeast of Lộc Ninh, they had been killed by airstrikes. At 19:35 a unit of the 1st Brigade, 25th Infantry Division engaged 6–8 PAVN/VC 6 miles northeast of Go Dau Ha killing six. At 21:45 helicopter gunships of the 1st Infantry Division attacked 40-50 PAVN/VC 2 miles (3.2 km) east of Dầu Tiếng, killing 13.

On 18 October at 01:00 a unit of the 3rd Brigade, 9th Infantry Division and a unit of the ARVN 46th Regiment, 25th Division engaged seven PAVN/VC on sampan 21 miles (34 km) east of Tân An killing all seven and capturing six individual weapons. At 06:55 a Ranger unit of the 3rd Brigade, 9th Infantry Division engaged six PAVN/VC 6 miles (9.7 km) northwest of Tân An killing all six. At 12:45 a light observation helicopter of the 1/9th Cavalry received fire 13 miles (21 km) north-northeast of Tây Ninh, they returned fire and directed artillery onto the position, five dead were seen in the strike area. At 20:25 a unit of the 3rd Brigade, 9th Infantry Division and U.S. Navy PBRs engaged 40 PAVN/VC 8 miles (13 km) north of Tân An supported by artillery and helicopter gunships, the enemy withdrew after 30 minutes leaving ten dead. At 21:00 a unit of the 2nd Brigade, 1st Cavalry Division received mortar fire 9 miles (14 km) northeast of Phước Bình and returned fire supported by artillery, helicopter gunships and an AC-119, the enemy withdrew leaving ten dead and three individual weapons.

On 19 October at midday a unit of the 3rd Brigade, 9th Infantry Division operating with RF troops 11 miles (18 km) north-northeast of Tân An engaged an enemy force, the enemy withdrew after 30 minutes leaving six dead and one capture and one individual weapon. At 18:00 a unit of the 3rd Brigade, 9th Infantry Division operating 11 miles west of Tân An received fire and returned fire supported by U.S. Navy helicopter gunships, the enemy withdrew at 19:45 leaving six dead and five individual weapons. Also at 18:00 helicopters of the 12th Combat Aviation Group engaged five PAVN/VC 5 miles (8.0 km) northeast of Trảng Bàng killing all five. At 19:35 a U.S. Navy PBR engaged an enemy force on the Saigon River 3 miles (4.8 km) southwest of Bến Cát killing six. A USAF OV-10 was shot down in Biên Hòa Province killing both crewmen. An OH-6 was shot down 6 miles (9.7 km) north of Trảng Bàng.

On 20 October at 08:30 infantry of the 2nd Brigade, 25th Infantry Division found the bodies of eight PAVN/VC 6 miles (9.7 km) northeast of Trảng Bàng, they had been killed by small arms fire earlier. At 13:10 a unit of the 3rd Brigade, 1st Cavalry Division was led to a bunker complex and arms cache 9 miles (14 km) northeast of Quản Lợi by a Chieu hoi, the cache contained 30 individual weapons, 11 antitank mines and 100 RPG rounds. At 14:10 helicopter gunships from the 1st Cavalry Division engaged five PAVN/VC 4 miles (6.4 km) south of Phước Vĩnh killing four. At 15:00 a unit of the 199th LIB operating 6 miles southeast of Xuân Lộc found a weapons cache containing 22 individual and one crew-served weapons. At 15:20 a unit of the 2nd Brigade, 1st Cavalry Division received 25 rounds of 82 mm mortar fire and returned fire supported by artillery, helicopter gunships and airstrikes. The enemy withdrew after 30 minutes leaving 14 dead and one AK-47; U.S. losses were five killed. At 15:50 a unit of the 1st Brigade, 1st Cavalry Division engaged an enemy force 15 miles (24 km) north-northeast of Tây Ninh supported by artillery, helicopter gunships and airstrikes. The enemy withdrew at 18:30 but 10 minutes later a UH-1 and an AH-1 were hit by ground fire in the area. PAVN/VC losses were two killed and U.S. losses were two killed. At 18:50 a helicopter gunship from the 1st Cavalry Division killed five PAVN/VC 12 miles (19 km) north of Tây Ninh and destroyed one 12.7mm machinegun. Also at 18:50 a unit of the 3rd Brigade, 82nd Airborne Division ambushed 10-12 PAVN/VC 7 miles (11 km) north-northwest of Phú Cường, killing six and capturing two AK-47s and one RPG-2 launcher. At 20:15 a mechanized unit of the 1st Brigade, 1st Infantry Division and U.S. Navy PBRs killed nine PAVN/VC in the water 9 miles southeast of Dầu Tiếng.

On 21 October at 18:25 a unit of the 1st Brigade, 25th Infantry Division supported by helicopter gunships engaged PAVN/VC 8 miles (13 km) northeast of Go Dau Ha killing 21. At 20:40 an armored unit of the 25th Infantry Division and RF troops engaged an enemy force 7 miles (11 km) northeast of Tây Ninh, the enemy withdrew two hours later leaving 15 dead, two AK-47s and four RPG launchers. On 22 October at 08:50 a unit of the 1st Brigade, 25th infantry Division engaged seven PAVN/VC 4 miles (6.4 km) northeast of Tây Ninh killing five. At 10:30 infantry from the 3rd Brigade, 9th Infantry Division found a munitions cache 10 miles (16 km) northwest of Tân An containing 14 107 mm rockets and 114 82 mm mortar rounds. At 11:45 a unit of the 199th LIB engaged 15 PAVN/VC 16 miles (26 km) east of Biên Hòa killing five and capturing two individual weapons. At 16:20 a unit of the 1st Brigade, 25th Infantry Division engaged 10–15 PAVN/VC 6 miles (9.7 km) northeast of Tây Ninh supported by artillery and helicopter gunships. The enemy withdrew at 18:00 leaving seven dead; U.S. losses were one killed. At 17:00 a unit of the 3rd Brigade, 9th Infantry Division operating 12 miles (19 km) east of Tân An found the bodies of 14 PAVN/VC killed by small arms fire in the previous 24 hours. At 19:30 a reconnaissance unit of the 2nd Brigade, 25th Infantry Division and RF forces engaged an enemy force 1 mile (1.6 km) south of Củ Chi, the enemy withdrew at 23:00 leaving five dead and one AK-47.

On 23 October at 03:30 U.S. Navy PBRS engaged 15 PAVN/VC on a sampan on the Saigon River 8 miles (13 km) southwest of Bến Cát, killing five and capturing three individual weapons. At 03:45 a unit of the 1st Brigade, 25th Infantry Division ambushed and killed five PAVN/VC 7 miles (11 km) northeast of Go Dau Ha. At 09:10 a unit of the 3rd Brigade, 25th Infantry Division engaged an enemy force 6 miles (9.7 km) southwest of Go Dau Ha supported by artillery, helicopter gunships and airstrikes. The enemy withdrew at 17:45 leaving 18 dead and two AK-47s; U.S. losses were one killed. At 11:10 a unit of the 3rd Brigade, 1st Cavalry Division found 40 PAVN bodies 14 miles (23 km) southwest of Phước Bình all had been killed three months previously. At 17:00 a unit of the 1/9th Cavalry found five PAVN/VC bodies 10 miles (16 km) east-northeast of Phước Bình, they had been killed by artillery fire 12 hours earlier. At 15:20 a unit of the 2nd Brigade, 25th Infantry Division engaged 5–7 PAVN/VC 7 miles west-southwest of Bến Cát killing five and capturing one and three AK-47s. At 16:30 a unit of the 2nd Brigade, 25th Infantry Division engaged an enemy unit 6 miles west-southwest of Bến Cát killing ten and capturing 2. At 19:30 a U.S. Navy PBR attacked eight PAVN/VC attempting to cross the Saigon River 7 miles west of Bến Cát killing all seven. At 22:00 a patrol from the 3rd Brigade, 9th Infantry Division engaged an enemy force 7 miles southeast of Tân An killing 15.

On 24 October at 13:10 a unit of the 2nd Brigade, 25th Infantry Division engaged an enemy force 9 miles (14 km) northeast of Trảng Bàng. The unit was supported by artillery, helicopter gunships and airstrikes and later by a mechanized infantry unit of the brigade. The enemy withdrew at 18:15 leaving 47 dead and 12 individual and three crew-served weapons; U.S. losses were ten killed. At 14:40 a unit of the 1st Brigade, 1st Cavalry Division received mortar fire 15 miles (24 km) north of Tây Ninh. Artillery, helicopter gunship and air support was provided and the enemy withdrew at 18:00 leaving 26 dead; U.S. losses were two killed. At 15:00 a unit of the 199th LIB engaged an enemy force 3 miles (4.8 km) northeast of Xuân Lộc, the enemy withdrew with unknown losses while U.S. losses were one killed.

On 25 October at 07:00 a patrol from the 1st Brigade, 1st infantry Division ambushed eight PAVN/VC 6 miles (9.7 km) southeast of Dầu Tiếng killing six and capturing two and four individual weapons. At 09:55 a unit of the 2nd Brigade, 25th Infantry Division operating 5 miles (8.0 km) northeast of Trảng Bàng directed artillery fire onto an enemy force killing six. At 11:40 a unit of the 1st Brigade, 1st Infantry Division found a weapons cache 5 miles south of Dầu Tiếng containing 29 individual weapons, ten light machineguns, 300 grenades and a radio. At 12:55 a unit of the 1st Brigade, 1st Cavalry Division patrolling 12 miles (19 km) north-northeast of Tây Ninh found 15 PAVN/VC bodies, they had been killed two months earlier.

On 26 October at 04:55 a unit of the 2st Brigade, 1st Cavalry Division in a night defensive position 11 miles (18 km) north of Tây Ninh was attacked by fire, the unit returned fire and called in artillery fire and the enemy withdrew after 25 minutes leaving eight dead and five individual weapons. At 09:20 a unit of the 2nd Brigade, 25th Infantry Division operating 6 miles (9.7 km) west-southwest of Bến Cát engaged an enemy force. Artillery, helicopter gunship and airstrikes were provided and the enemy withdrew at 14:30 leaving 15 dead and one captured. At 13:35 a unit of the 3rd Brigade, 1st Infantry Division found a weapons cache 6 miles northwest of Bến Cát containing 97 SKS, 28 carbines, 11 submachine guns, two light machine guns and 114 RPG rounds. An OH-6 was shot down 12 miles (19 km) northeast of Lộc Ninh.

On 27 October at 03:50 a unit of the 3rd Brigade, 25th Infantry Division engaged an enemy force near the Vàm Cỏ Đông River, 4 miles (6.4 km) southwest of Đức Hòa. Helicopter gunships and PBRs provided support and the enemy withdrew leaving four dead. At 11:00 mechanized infantry of the 3rd Brigade, 9th Infantry Division operating 9 miles (14 km) east-southeast of Tân An found five PAVN/VC bodies all killed by small arms fire in the previous 12 hours. At 14:50 the 1/9th Cavalry engaged an enemy company 15 miles (24 km) north of Tây Ninh supported by artillery, helicopter gunships and airstrikes. The enemy withdrew at 18:45 leaving six dead and one crew-served weapon. At 15:15 a helicopter gunship from the 1/9th Cavalry received fire 15 miles east-northeast of Phước Bình and returned fire and directed artillery and airstrikes on the site, 12 dead were seen in the strike area. At 18:20 a unit of the 1st Brigade, 25th infantry Division engaged 10–15 PAVN/VC 9 miles northeast of Go Dau Ha killing five and capturing three individual weapons. At 20:00 U.S. Navy PBRs attacked seven PAVN/VC in a river 5 miles (8.0 km) west of Bến Cát killing five.

On 28 October at 04:00 a unit of the 1st Brigade, 1st Infantry Division on U.S. Navy PBRs attacked an enemy force crossing the Saigon River 5 miles (8.0 km) southwest of Bến Cát killing 14. At 07:15 mechanized infantry of the 3rd Brigade, 9th Infantry Division operating 7 miles (11 km) southwest of Tân An received fire and returned fire killing ten PAVN/VC and capturing one AK-47. At 09:55 a helicopter gunship of the 1/9th Cavalry attacked 12 PAVN/VC 9 miles (14 km) east of Katum killing all 12. At 15:10 a unit of the 3rd Brigade, 9th Infantry Division engaged an enemy force 7 miles east-southeast of Tân An killing six. At 19:30 a unit of the 2nd Brigade, 25th Infantry Division engaged 12 PAVN/VC 6 miles (9.7 km) northeast of Trảng Bàng killing six. At 22:10 a U.S. Navy PBR attacked an enemy force 9 miles south-southeast of Dầu Tiếng killing nine. An OH-6 was shot down 10 miles (16 km) south-southwest of Tây Ninh killing one on board.

On 29 October at 14:25 a unit of the 3rd Brigade, 9th Infantry Division engaged an enemy force 10 miles (16 km) east-southeast of Tân An. The enemy broke contact at 15:10 but the unit pursued and reengaged until the enemy withdrew at 16:30 leaving 12 dead and one captured and three individual weapons. At 16:00 helicopter gunships of the 2nd Brigade, 1st Cavalry Division killed seven PAVN/VC 14 miles (23 km) east-southeast of Sông Bé. At 19:20 mechanized infantry of the 3rd Brigade, 9th Infantry Division killed five PAVN/VC 4 miles (6.4 km) southwest of Tân An. A UH-1 was shot down 5 miles (8.0 km) east of Phước Vĩnh.

On 30 October at 11:40 a Ranger unit from the 1st Cavalry Division engaged two enemy platoons 20 miles (32 km) northeast of Tây Ninh. Artillery, helicopter gunship and airstrikes were provided and the enemy withdrew at 15:00 leaving 22 dead; U.S. losses were one killed. At 11:45 helicopter gunships of the 1/9th Cavalry killed five PAVN/VC 7 miles (11 km) south-southeast of Phước Bình. At 12:15 a unit of the 2nd Brigade, 1st Cavalry Division found a 9-ton rice cache 9 miles (14 km) east-northeast of Phước Bình. At 22:15 a unit of the 1st Brigade, 1st Infantry Division killed five PAVN/VC attempting to cross the Saigon River 8 miles (13 km) west of Bến Cát.

On 31 October at 09:35 a unit of the 3rd Brigade, 1st Cavalry Division engaged a PAVN unit 12 miles (19 km) west-northwest of Phước Bình, the PAVN withdrew after 30 minutes leaving three dead and two individual weapons; U/S. losses were two killed. At 10:50 a unit of the 1st Brigade, 1st Cavalry Division found a weapons cache 10 miles (16 km) southeast of Katum containing 66 individual weapons, one light machinegun, two 122 mm mortars and various munitions. At 16:15 helicopter gunships from the 1/9th Cavalry attacked an enemy force 9 miles (14 km) southwest of Phước Bình and directed artillery and airstrikes on the area; 42 dead were seen in the strike area. At 22:00 a unit of the 3rd Brigade, 9th Infantry Division operating on Republic of Vietnam Navy PBRs killed eight PAVN/VC 7 miles (11 km) northeast of Tân An and captured one individual weapon.

== Aftermath ==
The operation concluded on 31 October 1969. Results of the operation were 41,803 PAVN/VC killed and 3,299 captured (U.S body count); U.S. losses were 1,533 killed. The operation was immediately followed by Operation Toan Thang IV by the same units in the same operational area.
