= 139th Infantry Regiment (United States) =

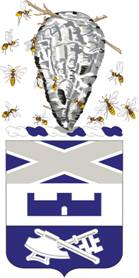
- Coat of arms
- Country: United States
- Allegiance: Kansas (historical); Missouri (historical); North Carolina
- Branch: North Carolina Army National Guard
- Type: Infantry
- Role: Training
- Mottos: First, Furthest, Last.
- Engagements: World War I

Insignia
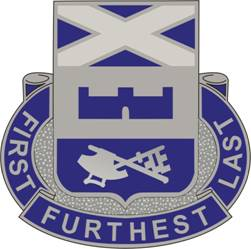
- Distinctive unit insignia

The 139th Infantry Regiment was an infantry regiment of the United States Army with two unrelated incarnations. The first 139th Infantry Regiment was formed during World War I from Missouri and Kansas National Guard troops and fought as part of the 35th Infantry Division.

The second 139th Infantry Regiment briefly existed from 1954 to 1959 with the 30th Infantry Division in the North Carolina Army National Guard.

== History ==
The first 139th Infantry Regiment was originally formed for service in World War I from Kansas and Missouri troops, the 3rd Kansas and 4th Missouri Infantry Regiments. The 4th Infantry, Missouri National Guard was organized on 1 March 1891 with companies at Brookfield, Mound City, Linneus, Bethany, Richmond, St. Joseph, and Savannah. It was mustered into Federal service on 16 May 1898 at Jefferson Barracks as the 4th Missouri Volunteer Infantry Regiment and stationed at Camp Alger, Virginia, Camp Meade, Pennsylvania, and Greenville, South Carolina. The regiment was mustered out at Camp Wetherill, South Carolina on 10 February 1899 and returned to state status. The 4th Missouri was mustered in to federal service on 26 June 1916 for duty on the Mexican border and stationed at Laredo, Texas. It was mustered out on 28 February 1917 at Fort Riley, and drafted into federal service on 5 August 1917 at Nevada, Missouri. On 1 October 1917, the 3rd Kansas and 4th Missouri Infantry were consolidated to create the 139th Infantry Regiment, assigned to the 35th "Santa Fe" Division. The regiment arrived in England on 7 May 1918 and began training and transit for combat in France. The regiment made its first combat action on 26 September 1918 in the Sommedieue sector. As part of the 70th Brigade, it attacked alongside the 140th Infantry Regiment. After taking their objectives here, the regiment advanced to the Argonne Sector and assaulted the German positions. By 1 October, the 139th was relieved by elements of the 1st Infantry Division and they had suffered 65% casualties. The regiment was demobilized between 9 and 11 May 1919 at Fort Riley, but was not reconstituted in the postwar reorganization of the National Guard.

The 139th Infantry Regiment was constituted on 28 October 1954 in the North Carolina Army National Guard, and assigned to the 30th Infantry Division. Its units were organized from existing elements of the other two North Carolina infantry regiments, the 119th and 120th, and the regiment was headquartered at Reidsville. The 139th was created to replace the division's 117th Infantry Regiment from Tennessee, which was used to create the 30th Armored Division that year. During the Pentomic reorganization on 1 April 1959, the regiment was broken up and consolidated with the 120th Infantry, except for the 3rd Battalion, which consolidated with the 196th Armor. The 3rd Battalion became the 1st Reconnaissance Squadron, 196th Armor.

In the 1990s, North Carolina's Officer Candidate School (OCS) was rebranded as the 139th Regional Training Institute (RTI) at Fort Bragg, reusing the heraldry of the regiment.

The 139th Regiment (RTI) trains Soldiers and Non-Commissioned Officers on artillery and medical tasks and consists of the following battalions;

1/139th - FA BN

2/139th - MOD BN (OCS)

3/139th - Medical
