= 230th Brigade =

230th Brigade may refer to:

- 230th Brigade (United Kingdom)
- 230th Brigade, Royal Field Artillery, United Kingdom
- 230th Sustainment Brigade, United States

== See also ==
- 230th Brigade Support Battalion, United States
