= 30th Mobile Brigade Combat Team =

US Army National Guard formation

- Brigade Shoulder Sleeve Insignia
- Active: 1 December 1973–1 September 2004 (30th Infantry Bge.); 1 September 2004–March 2005 (30th Armored Bge.); March 2005–present (30th ABCT)
- Country: United States
- Branch: United States Army; North Carolina National Guard
- Type: Infantry
- Part of: 34th Infantry Division (United States)
- Garrison/HQ: Clinton, North Carolina
- Nickname: Old Hickory (special designation)
- Engagements: Operation Iraqi Freedom; Transition Of Iraq; Iraqi Governance; National Resolution; Iraqi Sovereignty; Armed Forces Expeditionary Force; Operation Spartan Shield

Commanders
- Current commander: COL Paul W Hollenack

Insignia
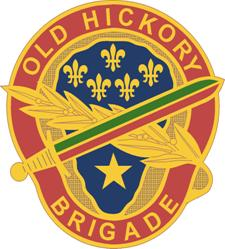
- Distinctive Unit Insignia

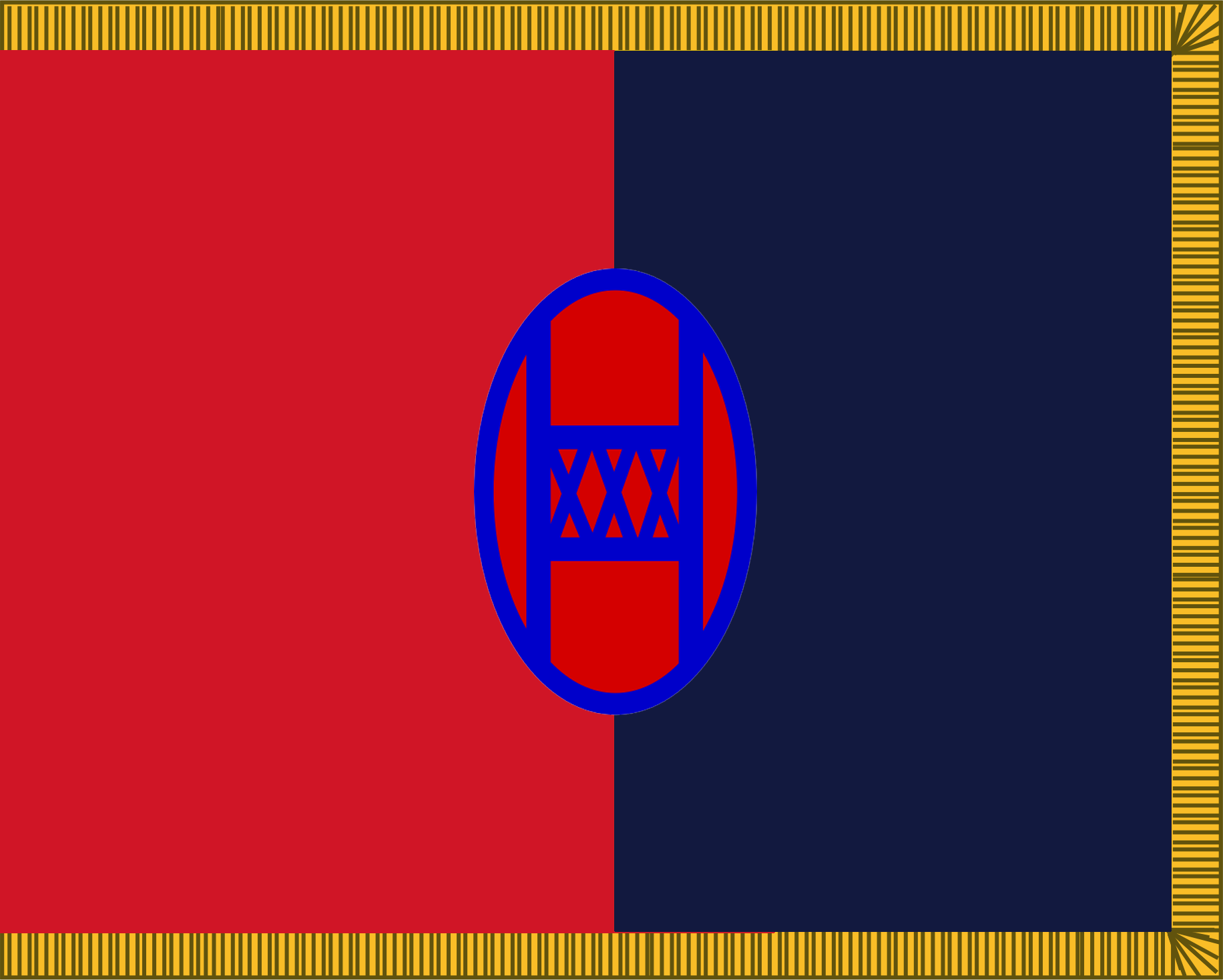
- 30th Mobile Brigade Combat Team Flag

The 30th Mobile Brigade Combat Team (30th MBCT or "Old Hickory") is a infantry brigade of the United States Army and the North Carolina National Guard.

The brigade includes units from North Carolina, South Carolina and West Virginia. It was formed from the remains of the downsized 30th Infantry Division of World War II fame. It was nicknamed the "Old Hickory" brigade, in honor of Andrew Jackson, due to the original division being composed of National Guard units from areas where he lived. In May 2025, the Pentagon announced that the 30th Armored Brigade Combat Team will convert to a Mobile Brigade Combat Team.

== History ==
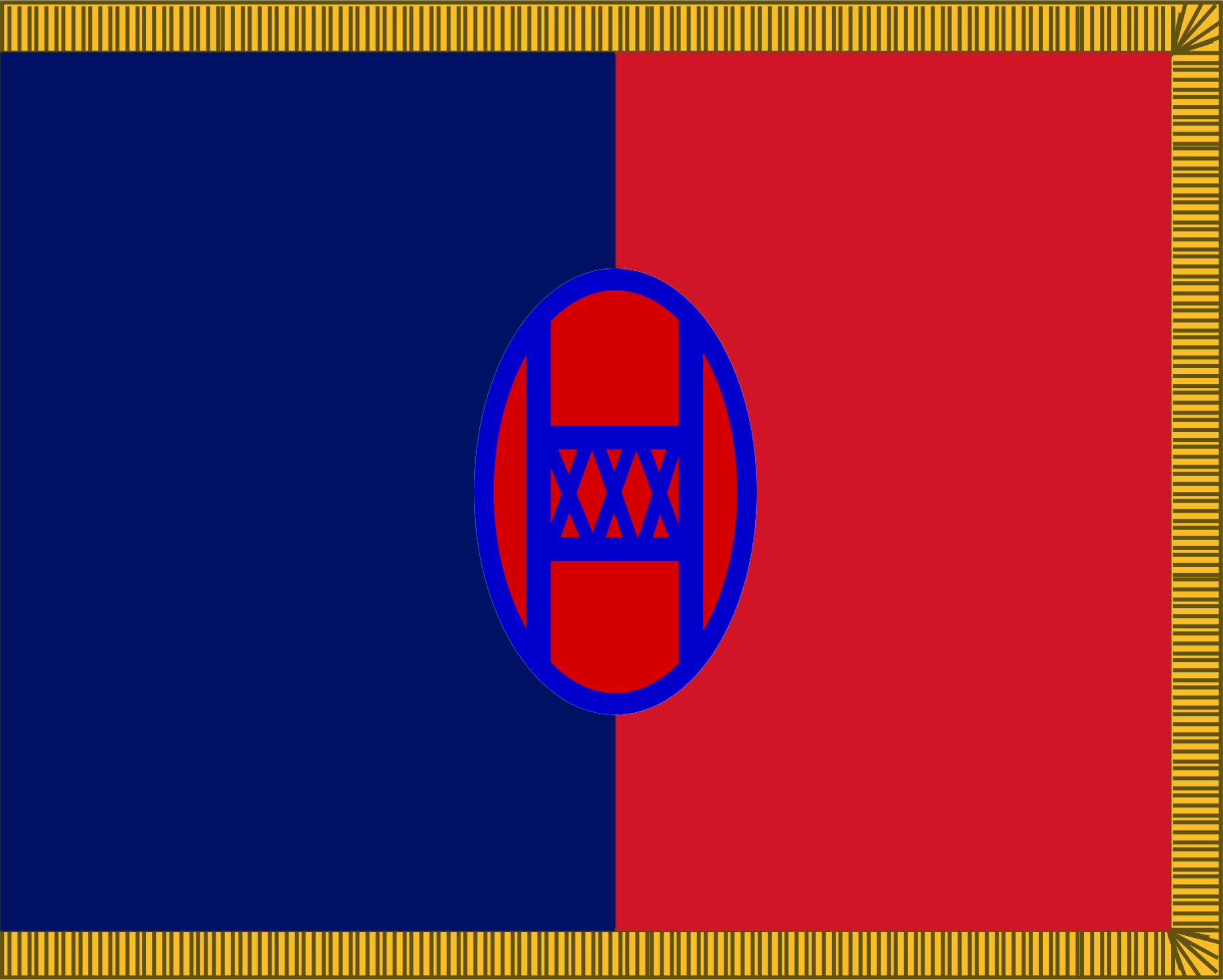
30th Infantry Brigade Flag

In 1973-74 the 30th Infantry Division, made up from the North Carolina, South Carolina, and Georgia Army National Guards, ceased to exist. The North Carolina portion of Headquarters, 30th Infantry Division was reorganized and redesignated on 1 December 1973 as the 30th Infantry Brigade. Later it became a Infantry Brigade (Mechanized).

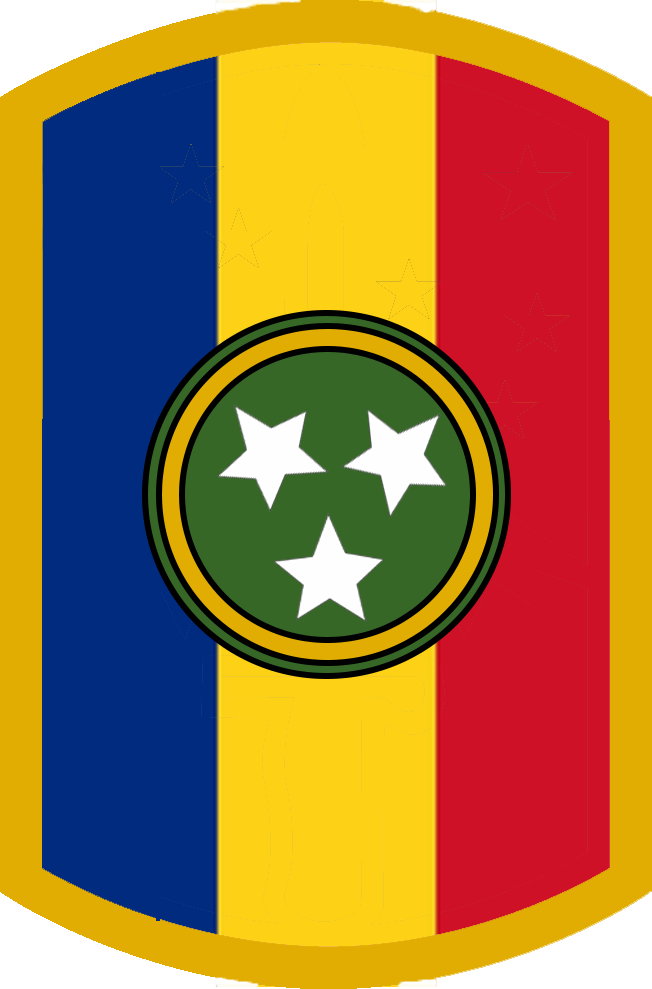
30th Armored Brigade original SSI 1974-1996

The brigade took part in Exercise Display Determination in 1984, 1986, 1987, and 1992.

The brigade was affiliated with the 24th Infantry Division on 5 June 1999 during the division's reactivation ceremony as part of the active/reserve component integrated division concept. The headquarters for the division was an active unit located at Fort Riley, Kansas while its subordinate units were all National Guard units.

From 2000 to 2001 a few select units from 30th Brigade were chosen to conduct a six-month peacekeeping mission in war torn Bosnia and Herzegovina. The deployment marked the first time that National Guard troops were utilized as front line patrolling forces since the beginning of deployment of combat troops to the region.

In July 2002 the brigade conducted "Operation Hickory Sting '02" at Ft. Riley, Kansas in preparation for the unit's upcoming National Training Center rotation the next year. During this time, an Illinois-based unit, Battery G, 202nd Air Defense Artillery Regiment, joined the Brigade. The unit's 2003 NTC rotation was dubbed "Operation Tarheel Thunder." After successfully completing its NTC rotation, 30th Brigade, along with the 39th Infantry Brigade from Arkansas, were informed that they would be deployed as part of Operation Iraqi Freedom.

In February 2004 the brigade began a year-long deployment to the Diyala Governorate in Iraq. With the deployment, 30th Infantry Brigade became the first National Guard brigade combat team to deploy to a war since the Korean War 50 years earlier. The brigade was also the first National Guard brigade to have its own area of operation in Iraq.

In 2004, one member of the Brigade, SPC Frederico Mérida was convicted of murdering an Iraqi National Guardsmen (ING) at FOB Mackenzie in Salh-Ad-Din Province near the village of Ad-Dawr and sentenced to 25 years in prison at his subsequent court martial. He apparently killed the ING member as a result of a sexual encounter gone wrong.

=== The Battle of Baqubah ===
The first Battle of Baqubah (not to be confused with Operation Arrowhead Ripper in 2007) was some of the fiercest fighting that the brigade encountered during its deployment. The battle began at approximately 5:30 am 24 June 2004 local time as insurgents from the group Al-Tawhid Wal-Jihad (aka Al-Qaeda in Iraq) attempted to ambush 3rd Platoon, Company A, 1st Battalion, 120th Infantry (Mechanized) with small arms, heavy machine guns, IEDs and RPG fire. The platoon was able to break through the ambush and attempted to turn the battle around with a counterattack. As the battle wore on, however, battle damage to all three of the platoon's M2 Bradley Fighting Vehicles forced the counterattack to halt and once again the advantage lay with the insurgents.

At around 6:00 am reinforcements from Company A, including company commander Captain Christopher Cash, left the unit's forward operating base and were also ambushed almost immediately. In the process Captain Cash was killed. The Bradley in which Captain Cash was killed as well as one other returned to base, leaving only three Bradleys from 1st Platoon to reinforce 3rd Platoon. As the reinforcements advanced on 3rd Platoon, an RPG struck one of the Bradleys, hitting SPC Daniel Desens and wounding several others. The platoon sergeant, SFC Chad Stephens, moved under fire without body armor or a weapon from his Bradley to SPC Desens' to retrieve the wounded Specialist. As SPC Desens was treated by the platoon medic, SPC Ralph Isabella, the platoon regrouped and continued its march towards 3rd Platoon. As they advanced once again towards 3rd Platoon, SFC Stephens's Bradley was also hit by an RPG, severely wounding his gunner and wounding several others including SFC Stephens.

After SFC Stephens's platoon reached its objective, SPC Desens and six other wounded personnel were evacuated via helicopter and the platoon carried on the fight until 3:00 am the next morning. SPC Desens later died of his wounds. SFC Stephens would ultimately receive a Silver Star for his actions.

As the well coordinated attack raged on for another eight hours, insurgents were able to overrun two Iraqi police stations as rocket and mortar attacks racked FOB Warhorse, the unit's forward operating base. Ultimately, Coalition forces were able to root out enemy hiding spots and strong points with UAVs as attack aircraft bombed them. In the end two soldiers from the 30th Brigade were killed and six wounded. While the actual enemy death toll varies, Coalition forces estimated at least 60 insurgents were killed in the attack. Abu Musab al-Zarqawi claimed responsibility for the attack although some experts question if Al-Qaeda in Iraq was actually capable of planning and carrying out such an organized attack, despite the fact that Al-Qaeda in Iraq flags were seen being raised by insurgents over the two captured police stations.

Zarqawi claimed victory over the Americans in the battle, although it may have been a Pyrrhic victory as the insurgent death toll was much higher than the Coalition one and the attack neither forced the Americans from the city nor stopped the planned transfer of authority for the city from the Coalition Provisional Authority to the Iraqi Interim Government at the end of the month. Zarqawi was killed in an air attack two years later outside of Baqubah and a year after that Operation Arrowhead Ripper succeeded in forcing a large part of the remaining insurgent forces out of the city.

=== Casualties ===
By the end of the deployment the brigade had lost five soldiers killed in action:

- Specialist Jocelyn L. Carrasquillo: 28, from Wrightsville Beach, North Carolina, assigned to HHC, 1st Battalion, 120th Infantry. SPC Carrasquillo was killed by an improvised explosive device on 13 March 2004.
- Captain Christopher S. Cash: 36, from Winterville, North Carolina, Commander of A Company 1st Battalion, 120th Infantry. CPT Cash was killed on 24 June 2004 in the Battle of Baqubah.
- Specialist Daniel Alan Desens Jr.: 20, from Jacksonville, North Carolina, also of A Company, 1st Battalion, 120th Infantry. SPC Desens was also killed in the Battle of Baqubah on 24 June 2004.
- Sergeant DeForest L. Talbert: 24, of Charleston, West Virginia, assigned to C Company, 1st Battalion, 150th Armor. SGT Talbert died 27 July 2004 in Baladruz, Iraq, when an improvised explosive device detonated near his vehicle.
- Staff Sergeant Michael S. Voss: 35, from Aberdeen, North Carolina, assigned to HHC, 1st Battalion, 120th Infantry. SSG Voss was killed on 8 October 2004 in Tikrit, Iraq when his convoy was attacked with an improvised explosive device and small arms fire.

=== Post-deployment and redeployment ===
In early 2005, as the brigade returned from Iraq, 30th Infantry Brigade transformed into the 30th Heavy Brigade Combat Team as part of the Army's new Brigade Unit of Action concept. With the transformation, the brigade disbanded the 119th Infantry Regiment whose lineage in the North Carolina National Guard can be traced back to before the American Civil War. The brigade then gained the 1st Squadron (RSTA), 150th Cavalry Regiment (WV ARNG) as the brigade's reconnaissance element. The 1–150th Cavalry had previously deployed with the brigade to Iraq as 1–150th Armor. The brigade also gained the 30th Special Troops Battalion, formed from the 30th Corps Support Group.

In October 2007, the brigade was alerted for deployment once again, to include both the North Carolina and West Virginia Army National Guard units. In preparation for the upcoming deployment, the brigade attended a 23-day annual training period at Camp Shelby, Mississippi in May 2008. The primary purpose of the training exercise was to complete Bradley Fighting Vehicle new equipment training for the scouts on fighting vehicle crews. The crews conducted gunnery through Bradley table VIII, while wheeled scouts performed gunnery with M2 .50 caliber machine guns. Other training included warrior task battle drill and individual weapons qualifications.

The July 2008 plan for the brigade's second deployment was:

November 21, 2008, stop loss goes into effect.

November 2008 to April 2009: The brigade will begin training in Camp Shelby, Mississippi while the 1/150th trains at Fort Pickett, Virginia. The two elements will link up at Camp Shelby in January after the new year begins. The unit is scheduled for a rotation at the National Training Center at Fort Irwin, California in February. The unit was still awaiting final word on its March training, but it is speculated that it may train at Fort Polk, Louisiana or other facilities before heading to the Middle East in April. The unit will undergo MRAP training in Kuwait before crossing into Iraq and occupying FOB Hammer near Sadr City.

=== Operation Iraqi Freedom VII ===
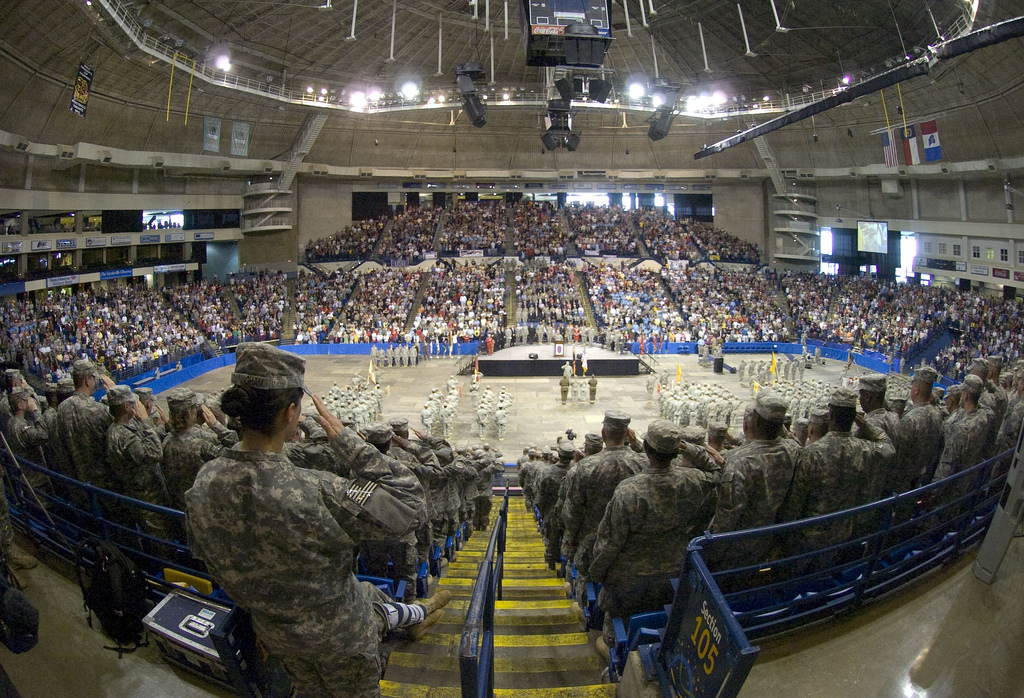
The 30th Heavy Brigade Combat Team prepares for a deployment.

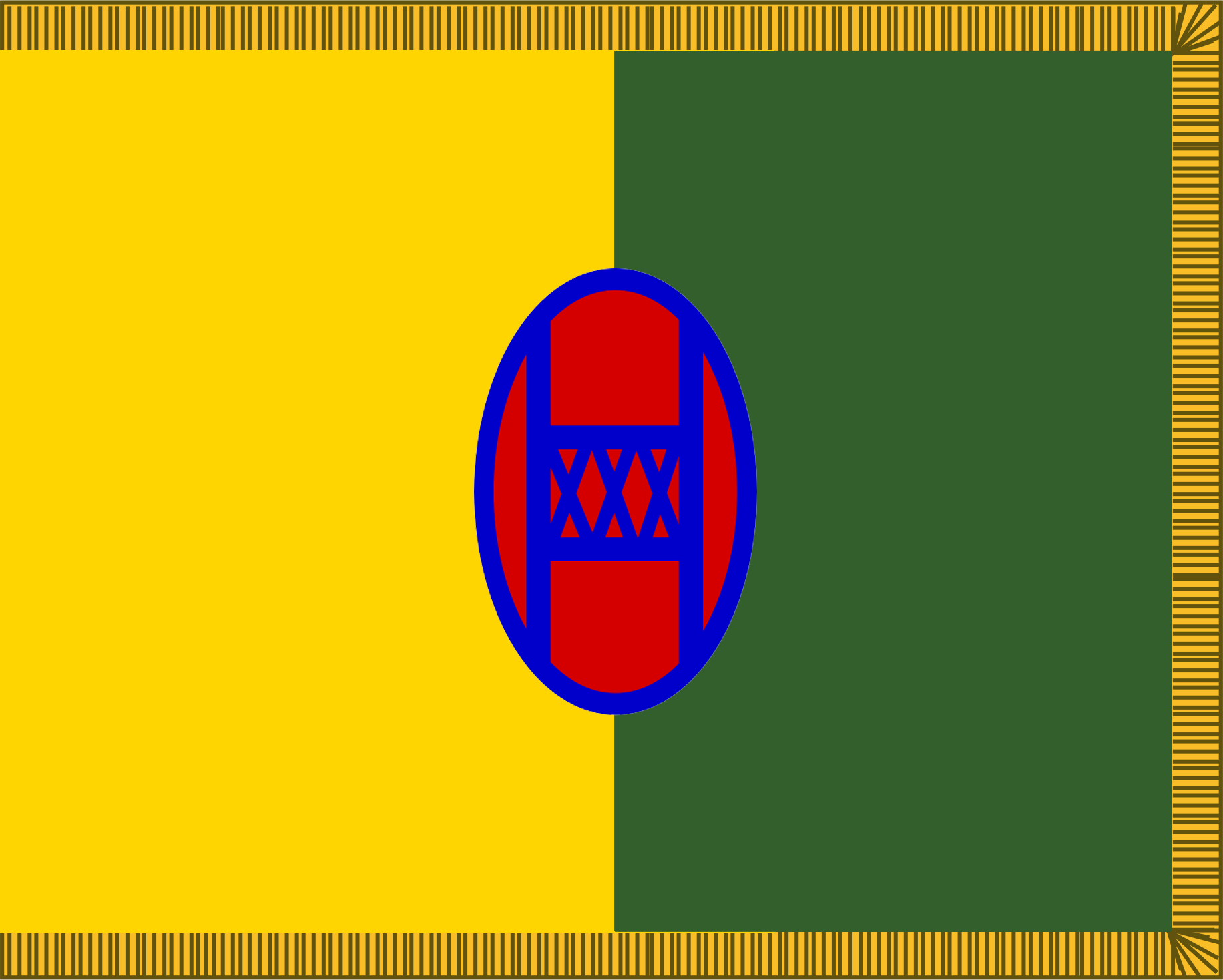
30th Armored Brigade Flag

In early 2009, 30th HBCT began mobilizing in Camp Shelby, Mississippi to conduct pre-deployment validation training. With training complete, the brigade returned to North Carolina for one last time before the deployment to hold a deployment ceremony on 14 April and to allow soldiers to say goodbye to their families. By the end of April 2009, the brigade arrived in Iraq and began the process of taking over for 2nd HBCT, 1st Armored Division in a process known as "relief in place." Shortly thereafter, the brigade began conducting patrols south of the Baghdad area as part of Multinational Division – Baghdad.

On 21 May, less than a month after arriving in Iraq, the brigade began to take its first casualties. While making their way to a meeting with local officials in the Doura Market, three soldiers from 1st Battalion, 252nd Armor Regiment's civil-military liaison team were killed by a suicide vest improvised explosive device (SVIED) in the Al Rashid district in the southwestern part of Baghdad along with multiple civilians. Major Jason George, 38, from Tehachapi, California was an Army Reservist and served as the battalion's civil-military officer. 1st Lieutenant Leevi Barnard, 28, from Mount Airy, North Carolina was a North Carolina Guardsman and served as Major George's assistant. Sergeant Paul Brooks, 34, from Joplin, Missouri was a Missouri Guardsman who had volunteered for the deployment and served as the team's medic. Alpha Co. also of the 1st Battalion, 252nd Armor was in the market area at the same time that morning when the attack occurred. Their swift response to the incident resulted in the timely treatment and ground evacuation of the remaining coalition casualties to the 10th CSH IBN Sina Hospital and their efforts undoubtedly saved many lives that day.

On the same day, soldiers from A Battery, 1st Battalion, 113th Field Artillery Regiment successfully fired the M982 Excalibur precision guided artillery round from FOB Mahmudiyah. This marked the first time that a National Guard unit had used the new precision guided munition in Iraq.

A little over a month later the brigade suffered four more casualties, this time from A Company, 1st Battalion, 120th Infantry. They were killed when their HMMWV was struck by an IED on 29 June in the Mahmudiyah area, south of Baghdad. Sergeant 1st Class Edward Kramer, 39 and a father of two, was from Wilmington, North Carolina and was on his second deployment to Iraq with the battalion. Sergeant Roger Adams Jr., 36, from Jacksonville, North Carolina had recently joined the National Guard and had previously served in the Marine Corps. Adams was also a father of four. Sergeant Juan Baldeosingh, 30, from Havelock, North Carolina was a father of three and had been in the National Guard for a little over a year. He had previously served in the Marine Corps. Sergeant Robert Bittaker, 39, from Jacksonville, North Carolina was a father of two and had served two prior deployments with the battalion, one of which was with the brigade's deployment to Bosnia in 2000. This attack resulted in the single largest loss of life for the brigade since the start of Operation Iraqi Freedom. SGT Baldeosingh would later be buried at Arlington National Cemetery. He would be the second North Carolina Guardsman to be buried at the cemetery since WWII. SGT Juan C. Baldeosingh is listed in the Arlington National Cemetery database as being laid to rest in Section 60, Grave 8847.

=== Operation Spartan Shield ===
In 2019, the brigade mobilized from Fort Bliss, Texas and deployed to Camp Buehring, Kuwait, replacing the 4th Infantry Division (United States) in command of Operation Spartan Shield.

30th ABCT relieved 3rd Brigade, 4th Infantry Division, in Kuwait, 1 November 2019. They returned to the U.S. in September 2020 and were replaced by the 2nd ABCT/1AD.

From Kuwait, many units of the brigade went on to support Operation Spartan Shield and Operation Inherent Resolve in countries around the U.S. Central Command area of responsibility.

== Units in 2020 ==
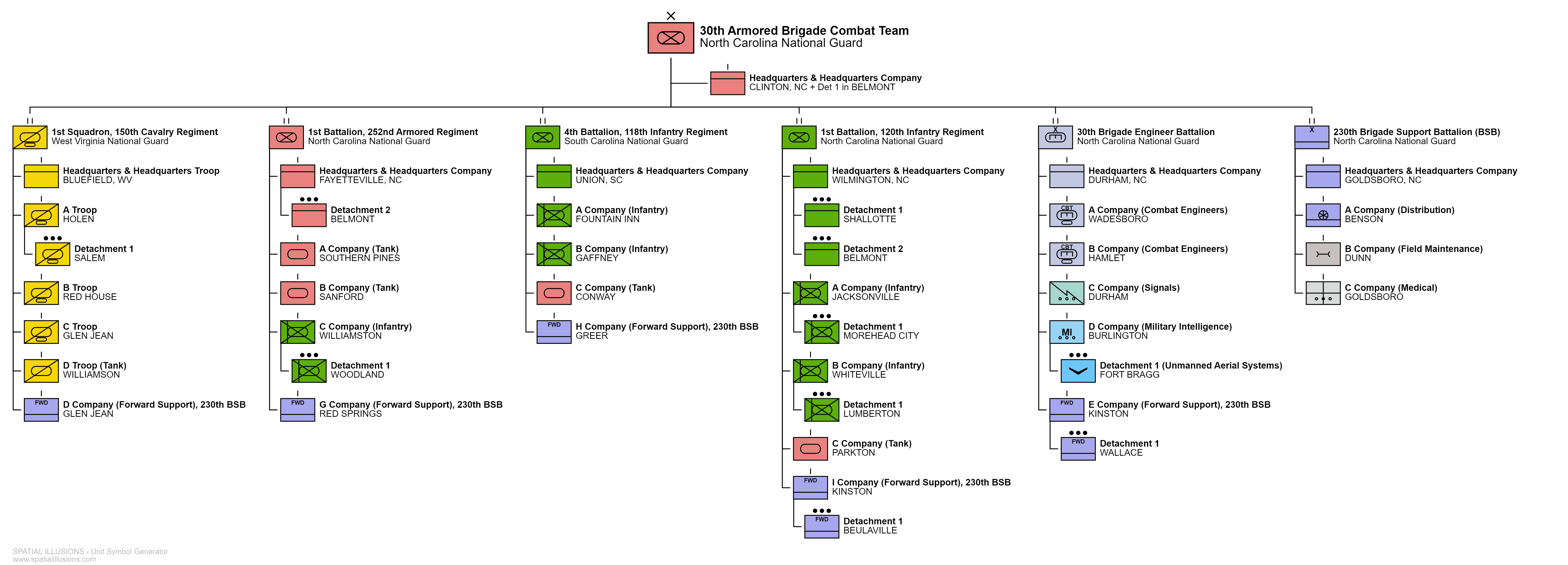
Organization 2023

In 2020 the units of the brigade included:

- Headquarters and Headquarters Company, 30th Mobile Brigade Combat Team, in Clinton, North Carolina
  - 1st Squadron, 150th Cavalry Regiment, in Bluefield, West Virginia
  - 1st Battalion, 252nd Armor Regiment, in Fayetteville, North Carolina
  - 4th Battalion, 118th Infantry Regiment, in Union, South Carolina.
  - 1st Battalion, 120th Infantry Regiment, in Wilmington, North Carolina
  - 1st Battalion, 113th Field Artillery Regiment, in Charlotte, North Carolina
  - 230th Brigade Support Battalion, in Goldsboro, North Carolina
  - 236th Brigade Engineer Battalion, Durham, North Carolina.

== Units in 2026 ==
In 2026 the units of the brigade included

- Headquarters and Headquarters Company, 30th Mobile Brigade Combat Team, in Clinton, North Carolina
  - 1st Battalion, 119th Infantry Regiment, in Fayetteville, North Carolina
  - 1st Battalion, 120th Infantry Regiment, in Wilmington, North Carolina
  - 2nd Battalion, 120th Infantry Regiment, in Lenoir, North Carolina
  - 230th Light Support Battalion, in Goldsboro, North Carolina (Division asset under operational control of 30th Mobile Brigade Combat Team )
  - M Company, 119th Infantry Regiment (Multi-Functional Reconnaissance Company)
  - 30th Signal Company
  - 230th Military Intelligence Company

== Insignia ==
=== Shoulder Sleeve Insignia ===
Description: The letters "O H" blue upon a red background, the "O" forming the elliptical outline of the device long axis to be 2 1/2 inches (6.4 cm) and short axis 1 5/8 inches (4.1 cm). The letter "H" within the "O". The letters "XXX" on the bar of the "H". The insignia to be worn with long axis vertical.

Symbolism: The letters "O H" are the initials of "Old Hickory" and the "XXX" is the Roman notation for the number of the organization.

Background: The shoulder sleeve insignia was originally approved on 23 October 1918 for the 30th Division. It was redesignated for the 30th Infantry Brigade on 20 February 1974. The insignia was redesignated effective 1 September 2004, with description updated, for the 30th Brigade Combat Team, North Carolina Army National Guard.

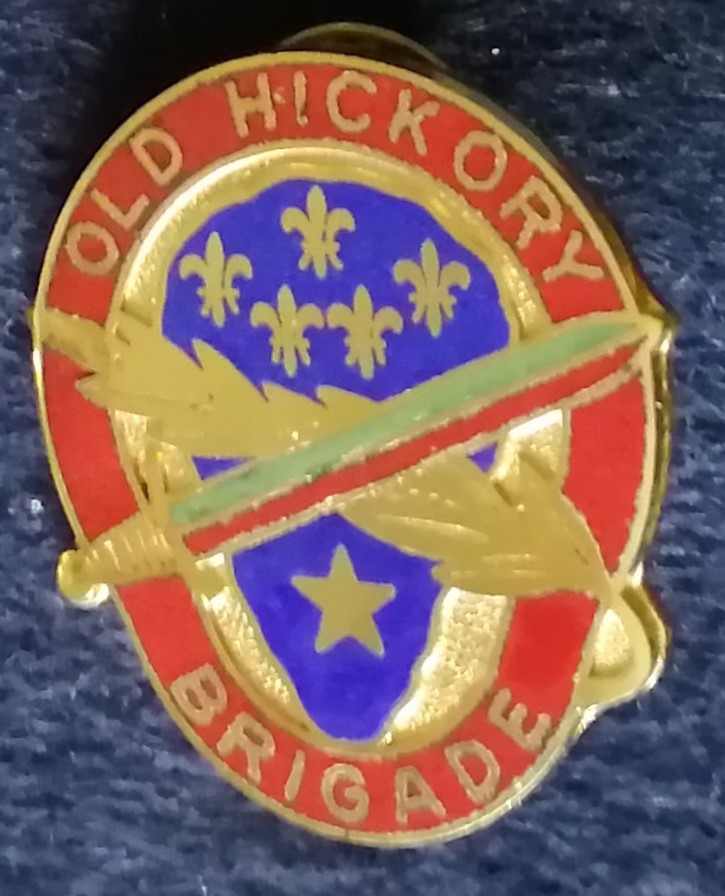
DUI of the 30th Armored Brigade Combat Team

=== Distinctive Unit Insignia ===
Description: A gold color metal and enamel device 1 1/4 inches (3.2 cm) high overall consisting of a representation of a hornet's nest in blue enamel charged at top with five gold fleurs-de-lis and in base with a gold five-pointed star, all enclosed by a continuous scarlet enamel scroll inscribed with the words "OLD HICKORY" at top and "BRIGADE" below and crossing at center overall from lower right to upper left a gold branch of laurel beneath a gold sword with point at upper right and hilt at lower left the blade divided in half lengthwise with green enamel above and red enamel below, both ends of sword and laurel branch protruding outside the scroll.

Symbolism: The hornet's nest, adapted from the crest of the North Carolina ARNG, is a reference to the unit's home area. The fleurs-de-lis represent the unit's participation in five campaigns in Europe during World War II, while the sword with blade in the colors of the Belgium Fourragére refers to that award received for service in Belgium and the Ardennes. The laurel branch and the star denote awards of the French Croix de Guerre with Palm and with Star for service in France during World War II; the scarlet scroll alludes to the Meritorious Unit Commendation.

Background: The distinctive unit insignia was authorized for the noncolor bearing units of the 30th Infantry Brigade on 11 June 1974. The insignia was redesignated effective 1 September 2004, with the description updated, for the 30th Brigade Combat Team, North Carolina Army National Guard.
