= 119th Infantry Regiment (United States) =

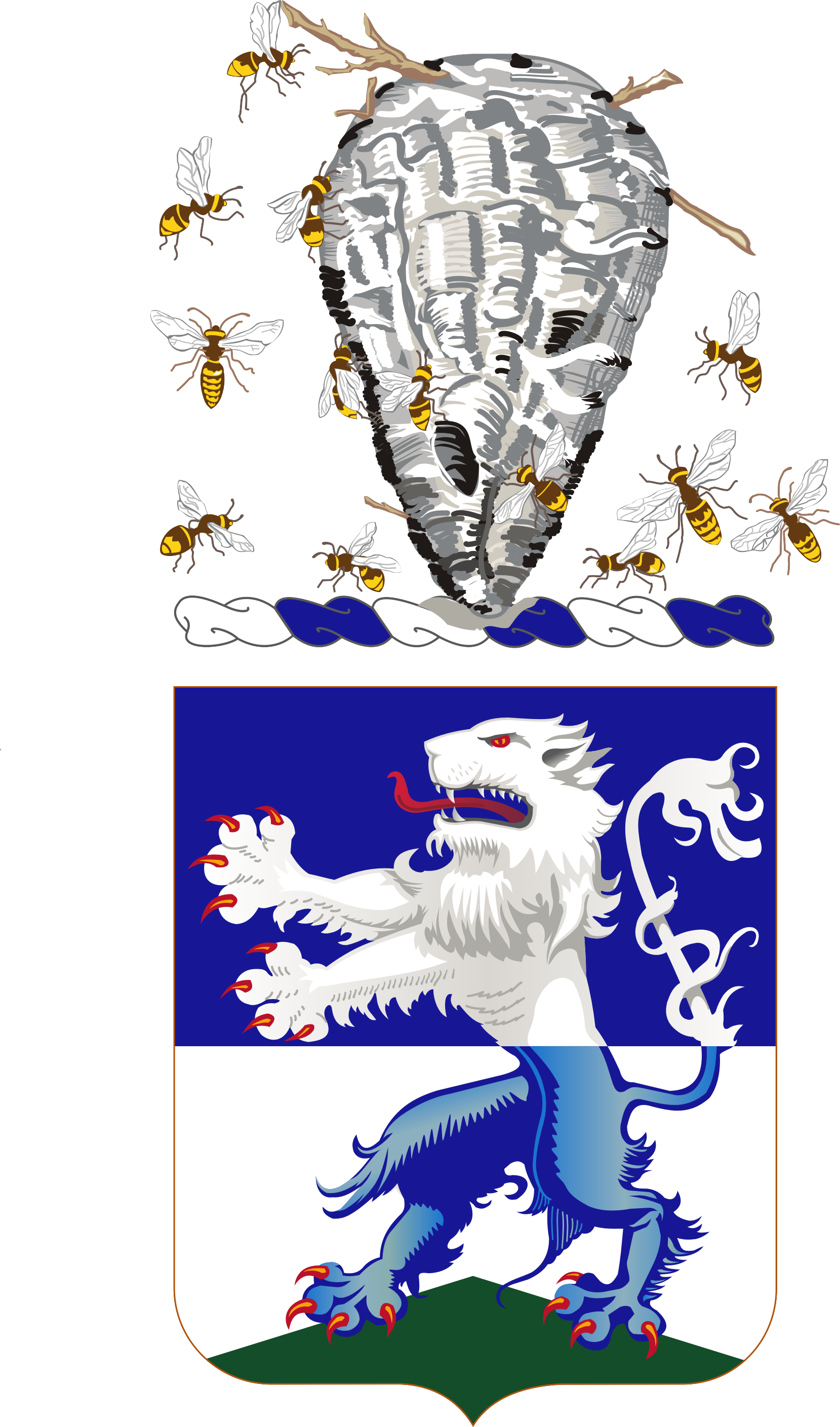
- Coat of arms
- Active: 1917-1919; 1942-1945; 1947-2004; 2026-present
- Country: United States
- Type: Infantry
- Part of: North Carolina ARNG
- Motto: Undaunted
- Engagements: American Civil War; New Berne; North Carolina 1862; World War I; Somme Offensive; Ypres-Lys; Flanders; World War II; Normandy; Battle of Saint-Lô; Battle of Mortain; Northern France; Rhineland; Ardennes-Alsace; Central Europe
- Decorations: French Croix de Guerre (2) 22 Feb 1944 Col Alfred V Ednie 15 Jul 1944 Col Edwin M Sutherland 27 Dec 1944 Col Russel A Baker 28 Mar 1945 Col Harry D McHugh 6 Apr 1945 Col Russell A Baker

Insignia
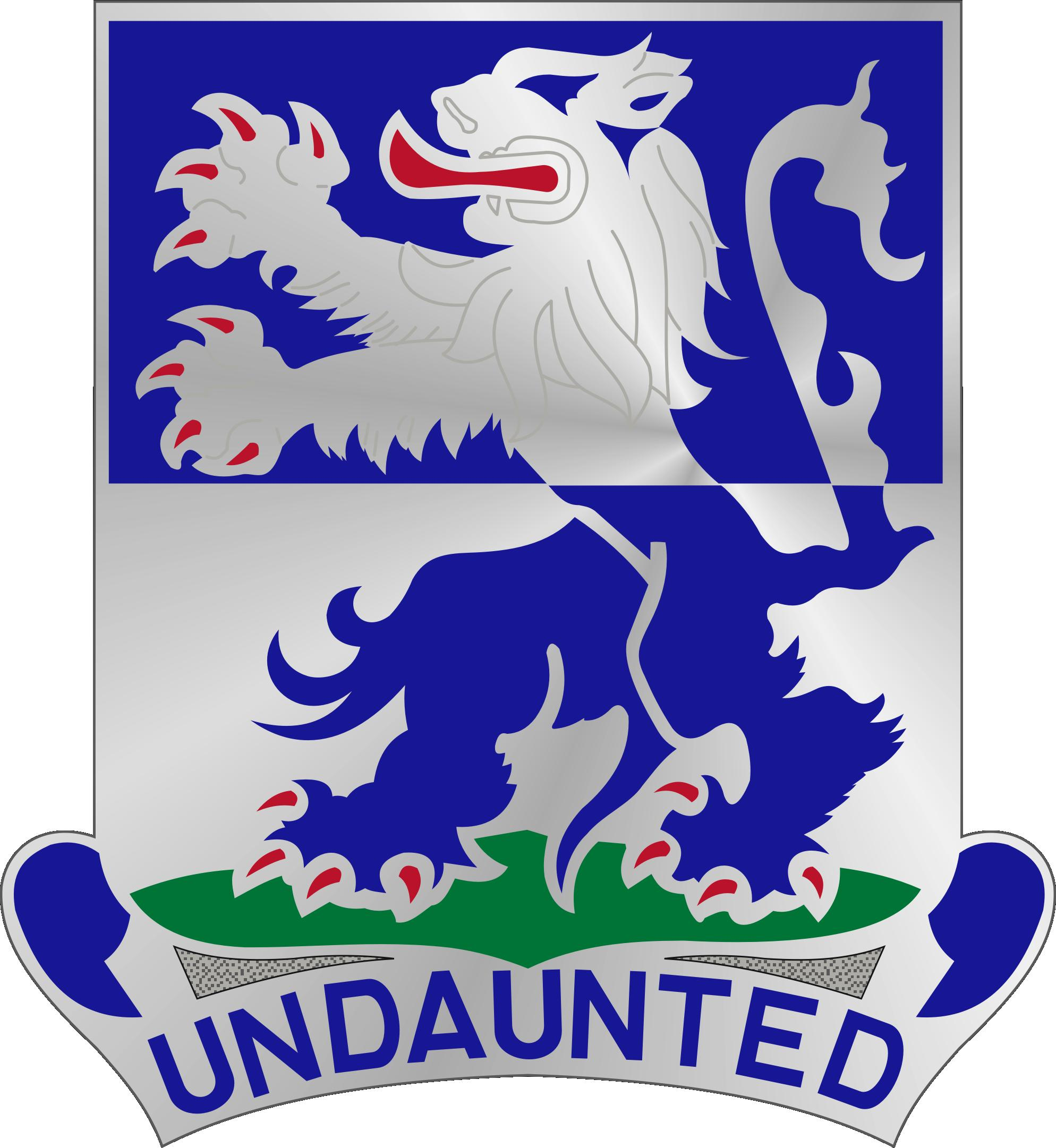
- DUI

The 119th Infantry Regiment is an infantry regiment of the United States Army. The unit was an organic element of the 30th Infantry Division ("Old Hickory") of the United States Army.

== History ==
=== American Civil War ===
On 19 April 1861, the 1st North Carolina Volunteers was constituted in the Confederate States Army and mustered into service from 9–16 May 1861 for six months from existing North Carolina militia companies.

- Company A (Edgecombe Guards), Tarboro, North Carolina
- Company B (Hornet's Nest Rifles), Charlotte, North Carolina
- Company C (Charlotte Grays), Charlotte, North Carolina
- Company D (Orange Light Infantry), Hillsboro, North Carolina
- Company E (Buncombe Riflemen), Asheville, North Carolina
- Company F (Lafayette Light Infantry), Fayetteville, North Carolina
- Company G (Burke Rifles)
- Company H (Fayetteville Independent Light Infantry)
- Company I (Enfield Blues)
- Company K (Southern Stars), Lincolnton, North Carolina

The regiment was redesignated on 11 September 1861 as the 11th Regiment, North Carolina Volunteers, to distinguish it from the 1st Regiment, North Carolina State Troops, a home defense militia regiment. On 12 November 1861, it was mustered out of service at Richmond, Virginia. On 31 March 1862, the regiment was reorganized in the Confederate States Army as the 11th North Carolina Infantry Regiment, and was surrendered and paroled on 9 April 1865 at Appomattox, Virginia. During the war, the regiment fought in the Battle of Gettysburg, Battle of the Wilderness, Battle of Spotsylvania Court House, the Siege of Petersburg, and the Battle of Appomattox, among others.

=== Post-Civil War and Spanish-American War ===
On 10 April 1877, the 1st and 2nd Battalions, North Carolina State Guard, were organized in central and eastern North Carolina from existing militia companies.

==== 1st Battalion ====
- Company A (Raleigh Light Infantry), Raleigh, North Carolina
- Company B (New Berne Grays) New Berne, North Carolina
- Company C (Elm City Riflemen), New Berne, North Carolina
- Company D (Goldsboro Rifles), Goldsboro, North Carolina
- Company E (Orange Guards), Hillsboro, North Carolina

==== 2nd Battalion ====
- Company A (Fayetteville Independent Light Infantry), Fayetteville, North Carolina
- Company B (Lafayette Light Infantry), Fayetteville, North Carolina
- Company C (Wilmington Light Infantry), Wilmington, North Carolina
- Company D (Whiting's Rifles), Washington, North Carolina
- Company E (Hornet's Nest Riflemen), Charlotte, North Carolina
- Company F (Charlotte Grays), Charlotte, North Carolina
- Company G (Anson Grays), Polkton, North Carolina

On 10 December 1877, they were reorganized and redesignated as the 1st and 2nd Regiments. The 3rd Regiment was organized on 17 March 1879. From 9–27 May 1898, elements of the 1st, 2nd, and 3rd Regiments were organized as the 2nd North Carolina Volunteer Infantry and mustered into service at Raleigh; other elements were assigned to the 1st North Carolina Volunteer Infantry. The 1st and 2nd North Carolina Volunteer Infantry Regiments were mustered out of service from 3–23 November 1898. On 8 May 1899, the 2nd and 3rd Regiments of Infantry were organized in the North Carolina State Guard. In 1903, the North Carolina State Guard was redesignated the North Carolina National Guard.

=== Mexican Border, World War I, and interwar period ===
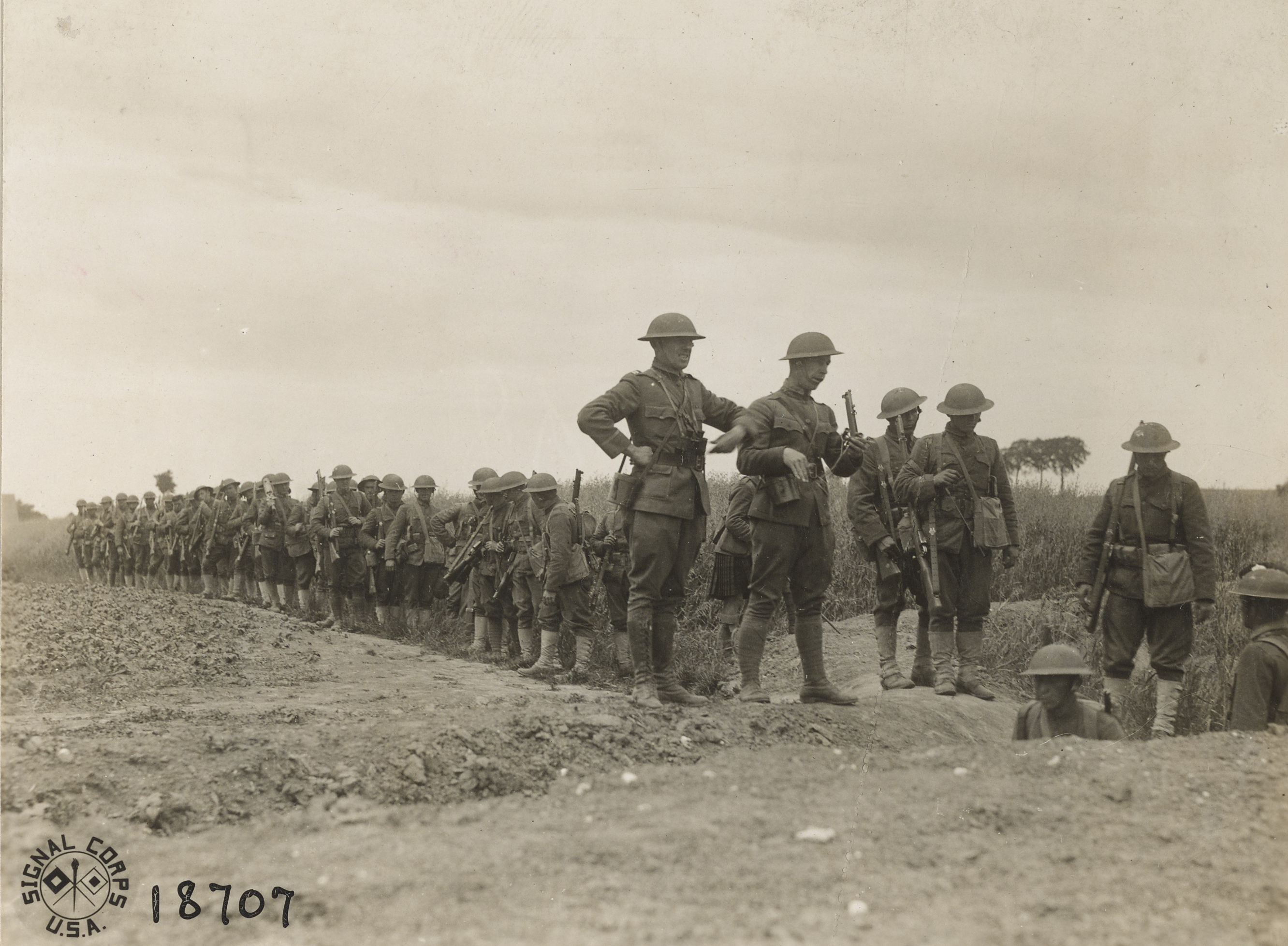
Doughboys of the 1st Battalion, 119th Infantry, 30th Division, entering trenches near Ypres, Belgium, July 1918.

On 19 June 1916, the 2nd and 3rd Regiments of Infantry were mustered into service during the Pancho Villa Expedition. The 3rd Regiment was mustered out on 27 March 1917, but the 2nd Regiment was not; after American entry into World War I on 6 April 1917, the 3rd Regiment of Infantry was called back into federal service on 25 July 1917 and drafted into federal service on 5 August 1917. On 12 September 1917, the 2nd Regiment was redesignated the 119th Infantry Regiment and the 3rd Regiment as the 120th Infantry Regiment, and they were assigned to the 30th Division. The 30th Division participated in the Second Battle of the Somme and the Second Battle of the Lys. The 30th Division was demobilized on 17 April 1919 at Camp Jackson, South Carolina. In 1919–1921, the 119th and 120th Infantry Regiments were consolidated into the 1st Infantry Regiment, North Carolina National Guard, with headquarters federally organized 2 May 1921 at Raleigh. On 8 November 1921, the 1st Infantry Regiment was redesignated the 120th Infantry Regiment and assigned to the 30th Division. The 30th Division was composed of the 117th, 118th, 120th, and 122nd Infantry Regiments; in 1924, the original 122nd Infantry was redesignated the 121st Infantry Regiment. Thus, the 119th Infantry would cease to exist until 1942.

=== World War II ===
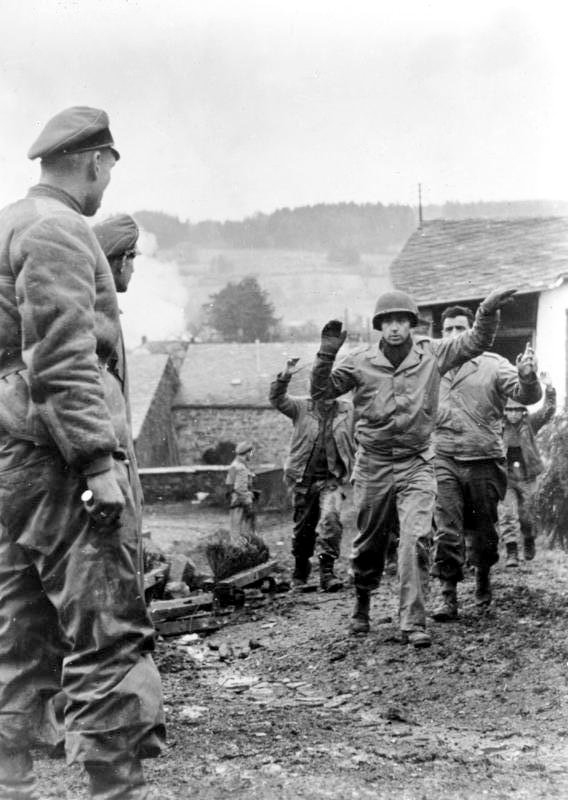
American soldiers of the 3rd Battalion of U.S. 119th Infantry are taken prisoner by members of Kampfgruppe Peiper in Stoumont, Belgium on 19 December 1944.

On 16 November 1940, the 30th Division was inducted into federal service. On 22 November 1941, the 121st Infantry was relieved from the division and assigned to the 8th Infantry Division, a Regular Army division that had lost two of its regiments to other duties. When the 30th Division was converted from a "square" to a "triangular" division in 1942, it also lost the 118th Infantry Regiment. To return the division to three regiments, the 119th Infantry Regiment was reconstituted in the North Carolina National Guard on 24 August 1942, activated on 7 September 1942 at Fort Jackson, and assigned to the 30th Infantry Division. The 119th Infantry would fight with the 30th Division in Europe in 1944–1945 in the Normandy, Northern France, Rhineland, Ardennes-Alsace, and Central Europe campaigns. The 30th Infantry Division was inactivated on 24 November 1945 at Fort Jackson.

=== Cold War ===
On 8 July 1947, elements of the 119th Infantry and the 1st and 3rd Battalions, 120th Infantry were consolidated, reorganized, and federally recognized in eastern North Carolina as the 119th Infantry Regiment. On 28 October 1954, the regiment, less those elements from central North Carolina, were organized to include the former 167th Military Police Battalion as the 1st Battalion. Elements of the regiment from central North Carolina were consolidated with elements of the 120th Infantry Regiment located in central North Carolina to form the new 139th Infantry Regiment. On 1 April 1959, the 119th Infantry Regiment was reorganized under the Combat Arms Regimental System and the Pentomic concept to consist of the 1st and 2nd Battle Groups, elements of the 30th Infantry Division. On 10 March 1963, the 1st and 2nd Battle Groups, 119th Infantry, were reorganized as the 4th, 5th, and 6th Battalions, 119th Infantry, elements of the 30th Infantry Division. On 1 January 1968, the regiment was reorganized to consist of the 1st Battalion, an element of the 30th Infantry Division. In 1974, the 30th Infantry Division was inactivated, and the brigade in North Carolina became the 30th Infantry Brigade (Mechanized) (Separate), what is now known as the 30th Armored Brigade Combat Team.

=== Recent history ===
The 1st Battalion, 119th Infantry was nicknamed the "Swamp Dragon Battalion" due to the nature of the terrain in its home area of eastern North Carolina. By the early 2000s, Company A was located at Roanoke Rapids. The battalion was alerted for service in Iraq in March 2003 and was deployed with its brigade. The battalion was inactivated in 2004. On 22 February 2026, the 1st Battalion, 252nd Armor Regiment was converted into the 1st Battalion, 119th Infantry Regiment.

== Decorations ==
- Presidential Unit Citation (Army), streamer embroidered STOUMONT, BELGIUM
- Presidential Unit Citation (Army), streamer embroidered PIVITSHEIDE, GERMANY
- French Croix de Guerre with Palm, World War II, streamer embroidered FRANCE
- French Croix de Guerre 1939-1945 with Silver Gilt Star, World War II, streamer embroidered STOUMONT AND HABIEMONT
- Belgian Fourragere 1940
- Cited in the Order of the Day of the Belgian Army for action in BELGIUM
- Cited in the Order of the Day of the Belgian Army for action in the ARDENNES
- Company C, 1st Battalion, also entitled to Meritorious Unit Commendation, streamer embroidered UNITED KINGDOM

== Distinctive unit insignia ==
- Description

A Silver color and metal enamel device 1 3/16 inches (3.0 cm) in height overall consisting of a shield blazoned: Per fess Azure and Argent, upon a mound in base Vert a lion rampant passant counterchanged, eyed, langued and armed Gules. Attached below and to the sides of the shield is a Silver scroll turned Blue inscribed "UNDAUNTED" in Blue letters.

- Symbolism

The blue is the color of the Infantry. The functions of the organization are allegorically implied by the ferocious lion, heraldically being the lively image of a good soldier who must be valiant of courage, strong of body and a foe to fear. The motto alludes to the symbolism of the shield and is expressive of the characteristics of the personnel.

- Background

The distinctive unit insignia was approved on 4 February 1943. It was amended to change the description on 29 March 1953.

== Coat of arms ==
=== Blazon ===
- Shield

Per fess Azure and Argent, upon a mound in base Vert a lion rampant passant counterchanged, eyed, langued and armed Gules.

- Crest

That for the regiments and separate battalions of the North Carolina Army National Guard: On a wreath of the colors Argent and Azure, a hornet's nest hanging from a bough beset with 13 hornets all Proper. Motto: UNDAUNTED.

=== Symbolism ===
- Shield

The blue is the color of the Infantry. The functions of the organization are allegorically implied by the ferocious lion, heraldically being the lively image of a good soldier who must be valiant of courage, strong of body and a foe to fear.

- Crest

The crest is that of the North Carolina Army National Guard.

=== Background ===
The coat of arms was approved on 4 February 1943. It was amended to change the blazon on 29 March 1953.

== Popular culture ==
In Fury (2014 film), the 119th Infantry is the element of the crack 30th Infantry Division that the tank "Fury" and its platoon from the 66th Armor Regiment of the 2nd Armored Division are assigned to support.
