= North Carolina Army National Guard =

Component of the US Army and military of the U.S. state of North Carolina

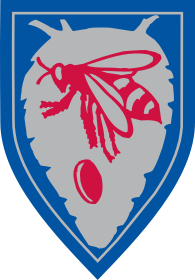
- Army National Guard Element, Joint Force Headquarters North Carolina Shoulder Sleeve Insignia
- Active: 1663–present
- Country: United States
- Allegiance: North Carolina
- Branch: United States Army
- Type: Army National Guard
- Role: Organized militia Armed forces reserve
- Part of: North Carolina National Guard
- Headquarters: Raleigh, North Carolina

Commanders
- Commander in Chief: Governor Josh Stein
- Adjutant General of North Carolina: Major General M. Todd Hunt

Insignia
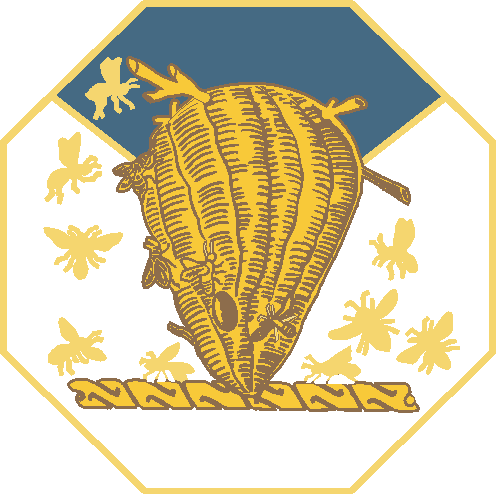
- Distinctive insignia

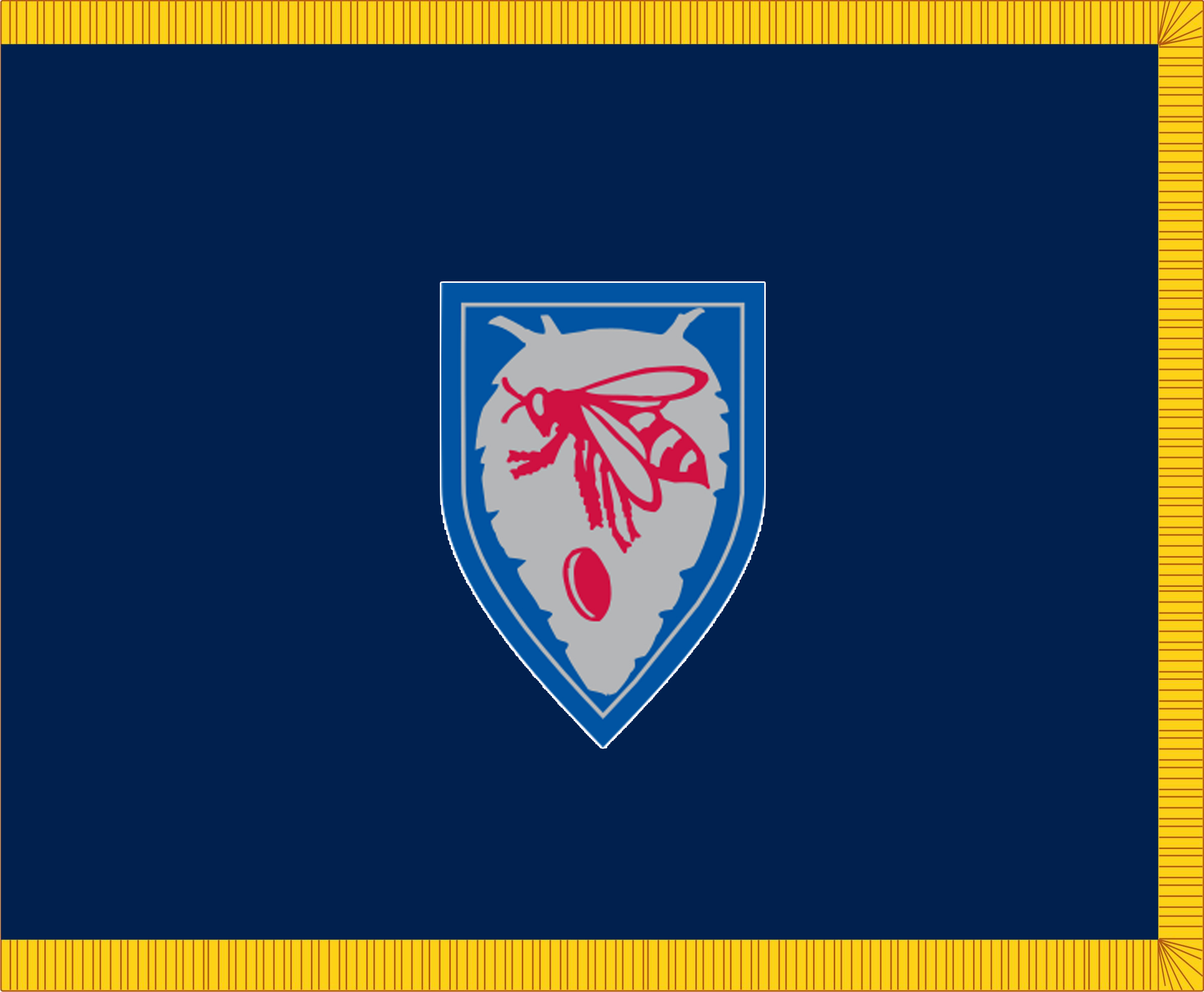
- North Carolina Army National Guard Headquarters Flag

- North Carolina Army National Guard Crest

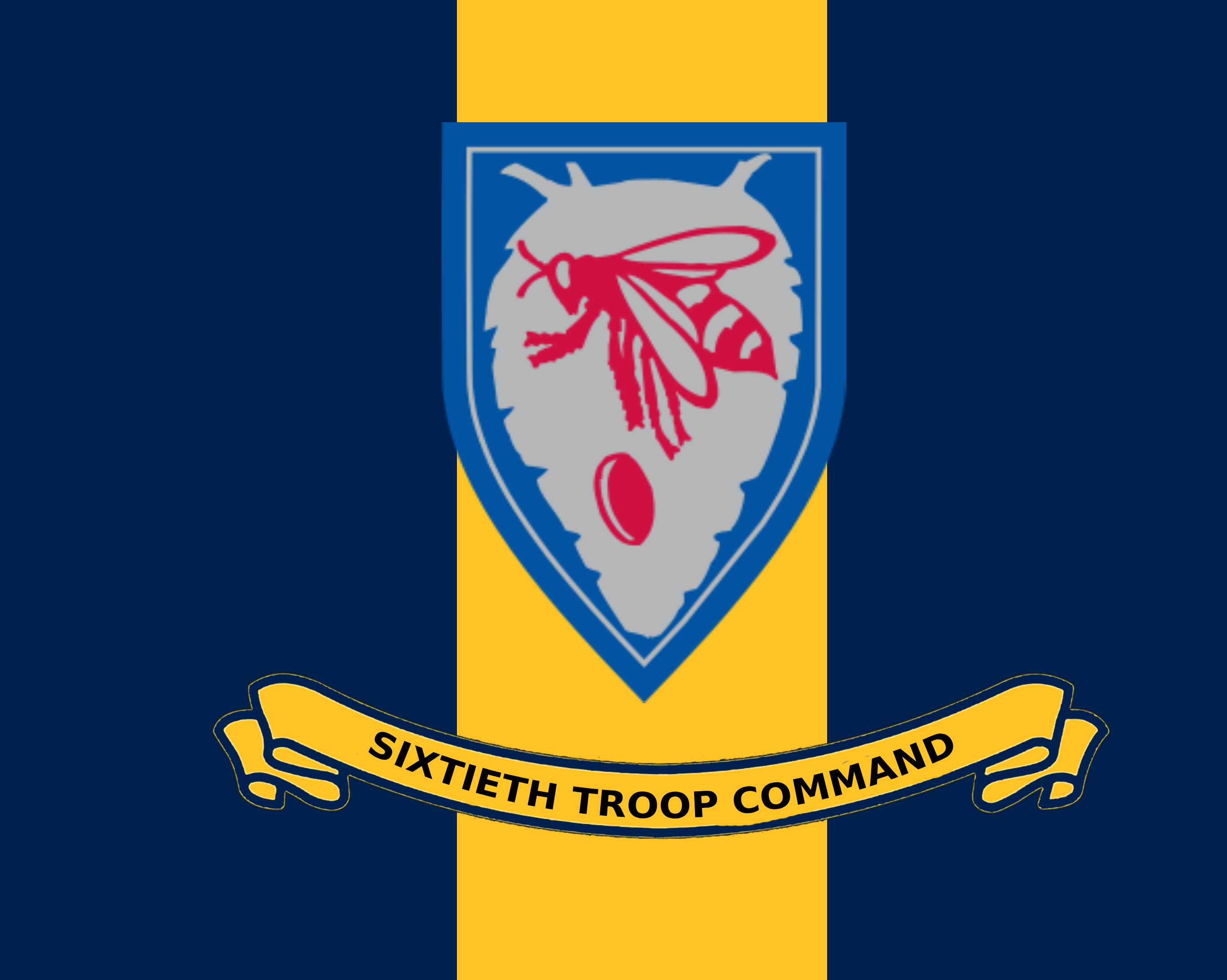
- North Carolina Army National Guard 60th Troop Command Flag
- Abbreviation: NCARNG

The North Carolina Army National Guard (NCARNG) is North Carolina's principal military force. The force is equipped by the federal government and jointly maintained subject to the call of either. The professional head of the North Carolina Army National Guard is the Adjutant General.

== History ==
The North Carolina National Guard, or Carolina militia as it was originally known, was born from the Carolina Charter of 1663. The charter gave to the Proprietors the right "to Leavy Mufter and Trayne all sortes of men of what Conditon or wherefoever borne in the said Province for the tyme being".

The Militia Act of 1903 created what would become the modern National Guard from a subset of the militia, including for North Carolina. North Carolina troops, notably including the 30th Infantry Division (United States) fought in the Second World War. The division landed at Omaha Beach in Normandy in June 1944, only four days after the original assault landings. It then took part in every major European campaign, including at Normandy, then in Northern France, the Rhineland, Ardennes – Alsace and Central Europe.

The 48th "Hurricane" Infantry Division was formed on 15 September 1946 by Florida and Georgia National Guardsmen. The division conducted its first annual training from 18 July to 1 August 1948 at Fort Jackson.

To prepare for challenges in Western Europe, the new Army troop basis of 1952 authorized the conversion of four National Guard infantry divisions to armoured divisions. Among them, Georgia agreed to convert the 48th Infantry Division to an armoured formation.

The 118th Artillery, with three battalions part of the 48th Armored Division, was broken up on 1 January 1968 and its elements reorganized and redesignated as follows: Headquarters, Headquarters and Service Battery, 1st Battalion, consolidated with Headquarters and Headquarters Battery, 48th Armoured Division Artillery, and consolidated unit reorganized and redesignated as Headquarters and Headquarters Battery, 118th Artillery Group. Redesignated 1 May 1972 as Headquarters and Headquarters Battery, 118th Field Artillery Group. Redesignated 9 May 1978 as Headquarters and Headquarters Battery, 118th Field Artillery Brigade.

The 118th FAB was consolidated 1 September 1992 with the 230th Field Artillery to form the 118th Field Artillery, a parent regiment under the United States Army Regimental System, to consist of the 1st Battalion, an element of the 48th Infantry Brigade.

== Structure ==
The North Carolina Army National Guard is organized into six major commands. These units come under supervision of the Adjutant General in time of peace, and automatically become part of his command when they are first ordered into active service in the active military services of the United States in case of emergency:

- 30th Armored Brigade (Old Hickory)
  - Headquarters and Headquarters Company (HHC) (HQ at Clinton)
  - 1st Squadron, 150th Cavalry Regiment (West Virginia Army National Guard)
    - Troop D in Sanford, North Carolina, remainder of 1st Squadron in West Virginia
  - 1st Battalion, 120th Infantry Regiment (HQ at Wilmington)
  - 1st Battalion, 252nd Armor Regiment (HQ at Fayetteville)
  - 230th Brigade Support Battalion (230th BSB) (HQ at Goldsboro)
  - 236th Brigade Engineer Battalion (HQ in Durham, NC)
  - 1st Battalion, 113th Field Artillery Regiment (1-113th FAR) (HQ at Charlotte)
  - 4th Battalion, 118th Infantry Regiment (South Carolina Army National Guard)
- 449th Combat Aviation Brigade(449th TAB)
  - Headquarters and Headquarters Company
  - 1st Battalion (Attack Reconnaissance), 130th Aviation Regiment
  - 2nd Battalion (Airfield Operations), 130th Aviation Regiment
  - 1st Battalion, 131st Aviation Regiment
    - Company C
  - Detachment 17 (Joint Operational Support Airlift Center)
  - 2nd Battalion, 151st Aviation Regiment
    - Company B
      - Detachment 1
  - 638th Aviation Support Battalion
    - Company B
      - Detachment 1
  - 677th Engineer Detachment (FFTG)
  - 430th Engineer Detachment (FFTG)
- 130th Maneuver Enhancement Brigade
  - 105th Military Police Battalion (HQ at Asheville)
  - 105th Engineer Battalion (HQ at Raeford)
    - 429th Engineer Detachment (Concrete)
  - 505th Engineer Battalion (HQ at Gastonia)
  - 109th Military Police Battalion (HQ at Kinston)
  - Headquarters Sustainment Company (HQ at Charlotte)
  - 295th Signal Support Company (HQ at Mooresville)
  - 578th FEST (HQ at Charlotte)
  - MCPOD (HQ at Charlotte)
- 29th Division Sustainment Brigade
  - Headquarters and Headquarters Company (HQ at Greensboro)
  - 113th Special Troops Battalion (HQ at Asheboro)
  - 630th Combat Sustainment Support Battalion (HQ at Lenoir)
- 60th Troop Command
  - Recruiting and Retention Command (HQ at Raleigh)
  - 382d Public Affairs Detachment (HQ at Raleigh)
  - 130th Military History Detachment (HQ at Raleigh)
  - 440th Army Band (HQ at Raleigh)
  - Medical Detachment (HQ at Stem)
  - 5th Battalion, 113th Field Artillery (HQ at Louisburg)
  - 42d Civil Support Detachment (HQ at Greenville)
  - 403d Rigger Support Team
  - 430th Ordnance Company (EOD) (HQ at Washington)
  - Company B, 3rd Battalion, 20th Special Forces Group (HQ at Roanoke Rapids)
  - Company B, 1st Battalion, 20th Special Forces Group (HQ at Albemarle)
  - Special Operations Detachment-X-JSOC
- 139th Regiment

=== Regimental affiliations ===
Regiments of the North Carolina Army National Guard are listed in order of precedence according to the U.S. Army Regimental System -- Army National Guard where seniority does not always bring priority:

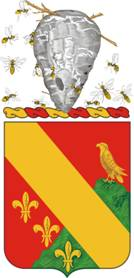
113th Field Artillery Regiment

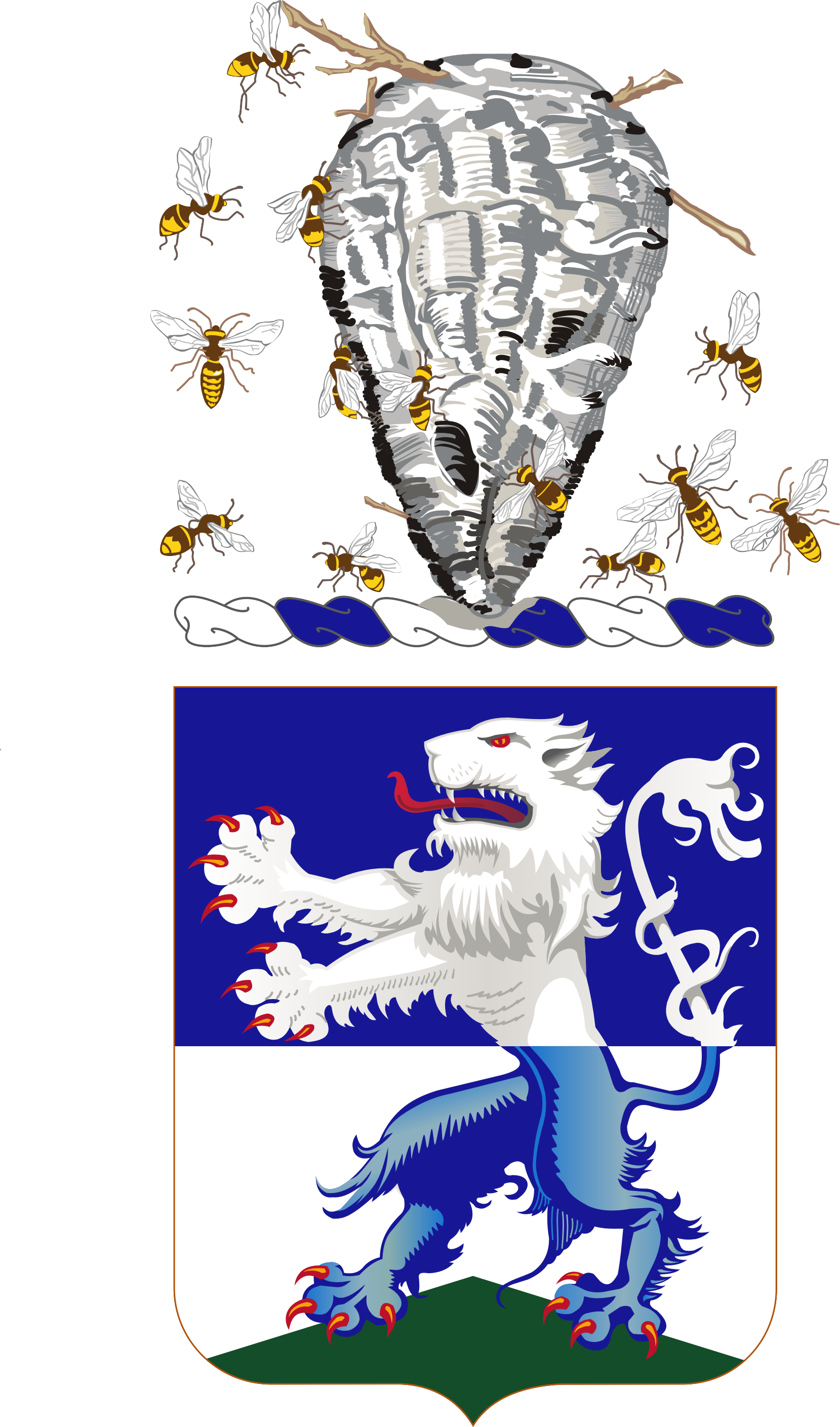
119th Infantry Regiment
(Second North Carolina)

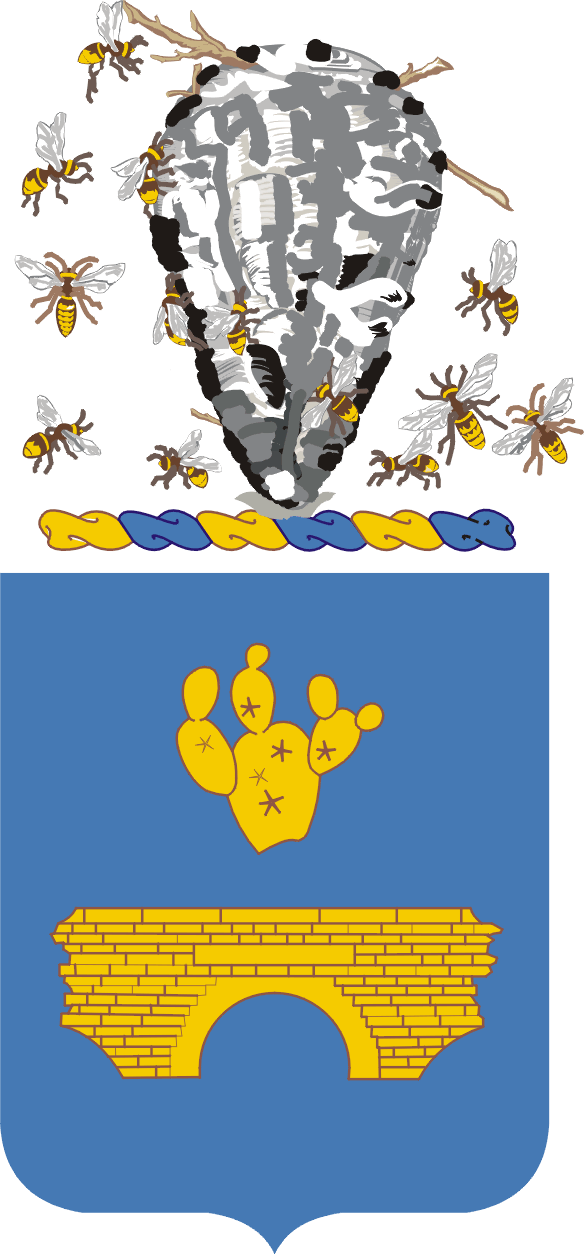
120th Infantry Regiment
(Third North Carolina)

130th Aviation Regiment

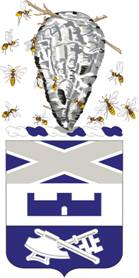
139th Infantry Regiment

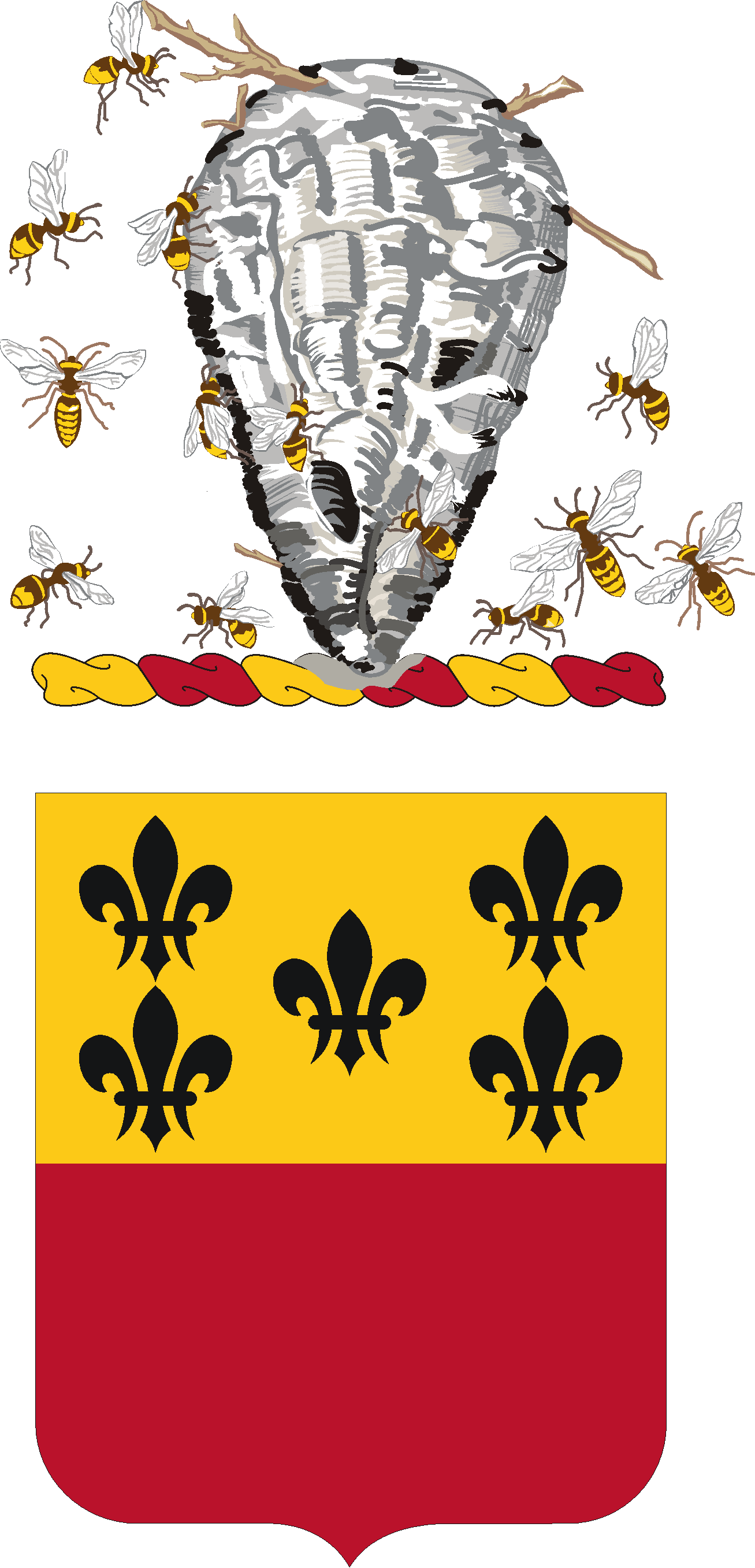
196th Armor Regiment

196th Cavalry Regiment

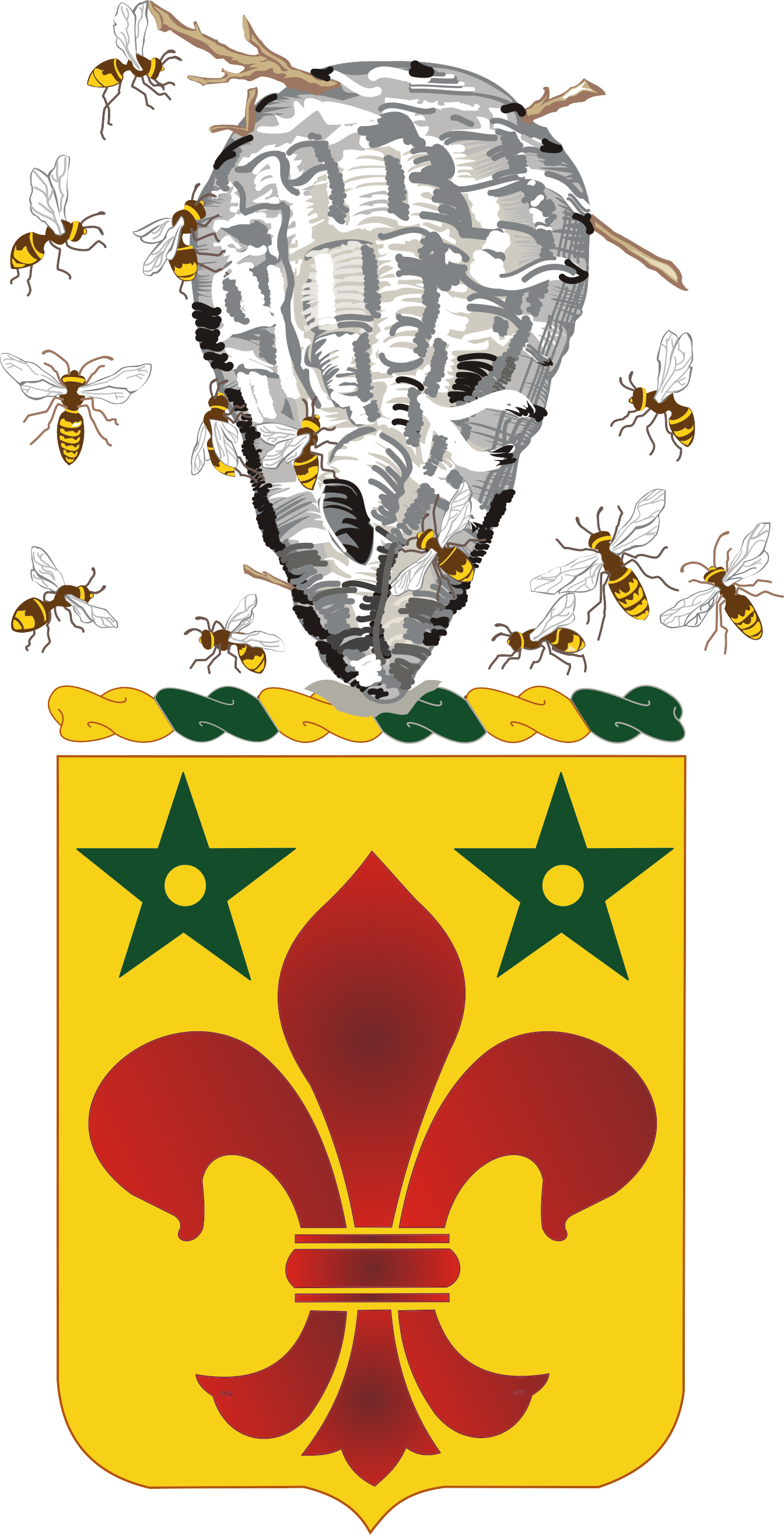
252d Armor Regiment

== See also ==
- 1969 Greensboro uprising
- North Carolina Air National Guard
