= Jack J. Pendleton =

United States Army soldier

- Born: March 31, 1918; Sentinel Butte, North Dakota, U.S.
- Died: October 12, 1944 (aged 26); Bardenberg, Germany
- Burial place: Tahoma Cemetery, Yakima, Washington
- Military career
- Allegiance: United States of America
- Branch: United States Army
- Service years: 1942 - 1944
- Rank: Staff Sergeant
- Units: 120th Infantry Regiment, 30th Infantry Division
- Conflicts: World War II
- Awards: Medal of Honor; Silver Star; Purple Heart (3)

Jack James Pendleton (March 31, 1918 – October 12, 1944) was a United States Army soldier and a recipient of the United States military's highest decoration—the Medal of Honor—for his actions in World War II.

== Biography ==
Pendleton joined the Army from Yakima, Washington in July 1942, and by October 12, 1944, was serving as a staff sergeant in Company I, 120th Infantry Regiment, 30th Infantry Division. On that day, in Bardenberg, Germany, Pendleton voluntarily led his squad in an attack against an enemy machine gun. After being seriously wounded, he continued forward alone, purposely drawing the machine gun's fire so that another squad could advance and destroy the enemy position. Killed by the intense fire from the machine gun, Pendleton was posthumously awarded the Medal of Honor six months later, on April 6, 1945.

Pendleton, aged 26 at his death, was buried in Tahoma Cemetery, Yakima, Washington.

== Medal of Honor citation ==
Staff Sergeant Pendleton's official Medal of Honor citation reads:

For conspicuous gallantry and intrepidity at the risk of his life above and beyond the call of duty on 12 October 1944. When Company I was advancing on the town of Bardenberg, Germany, they reached a point approximately two-thirds of the distance through the town when they were pinned down by fire from a nest of enemy machineguns. This enemy strong point was protected by a lone machinegun strategically placed at an intersection and firing down a street which offered little or no cover or concealment for the advancing troops. The elimination of this protecting machinegun was imperative in order that the stronger position it protected could be neutralized. After repeated and unsuccessful attempts had been made to knock out this position, S/Sgt. Pendleton volunteered to lead his squad in an attempt to neutralize this strongpoint. S/Sgt. Pendleton started his squad slowly forward, crawling about 10 yards in front of his men in the advance toward the enemy gun. After advancing approximately 130 yards under the withering fire, S/Sgt. Pendleton was seriously wounded in the leg by a burst from the gun he was assaulting. Disregarding his grievous wound, he ordered his men to remain where they were, and with a supply of hand grenades he slowly and painfully worked his way forward alone. With no hope of surviving the veritable hail of machinegun fire which he deliberately drew onto himself, he succeeded in advancing to within 10 yards of the enemy position when he was instantly killed by a burst from the enemy gun. By deliberately diverting the attention of the enemy machine gunners upon himself, a second squad was able to advance, undetected, and with the help of S/Sgt. Pendleton's squad, neutralized the lone machinegun, while another platoon of his company advanced up the intersecting street and knocked out the machinegun nest which the first gun had been covering. S/Sgt. Pendleton's sacrifice enabled the entire company to continue the advance and complete their mission at a critical phase of the action.

== Awards and decorations ==

| Badge | Combat Infantryman Badge | | |
| 1st row | Medal of Honor | | Silver Star |
| 2nd row | Bronze Star Medal | Purple Heart with 2 Oak leaf clusters | Army Good Conduct Medal |
| 3rd row | American Campaign Medal | European–African–Middle Eastern Campaign Medal with 2 Campaign stars | World War II Victory Medal |
| Unit awards | Presidential Unit Citation | | |

== Honored in ship naming ==
The USNS Sgt. Jack J. Pendleton (T-AK-276), launched on May 26, 1944, by the United States Navy, was named in Sgt. Pendleton's honor on April 28, 1948.

== See also ==
- List of Medal of Honor recipients
- List of Medal of Honor recipients for World War II
