= 120th Infantry Regiment (United States) =

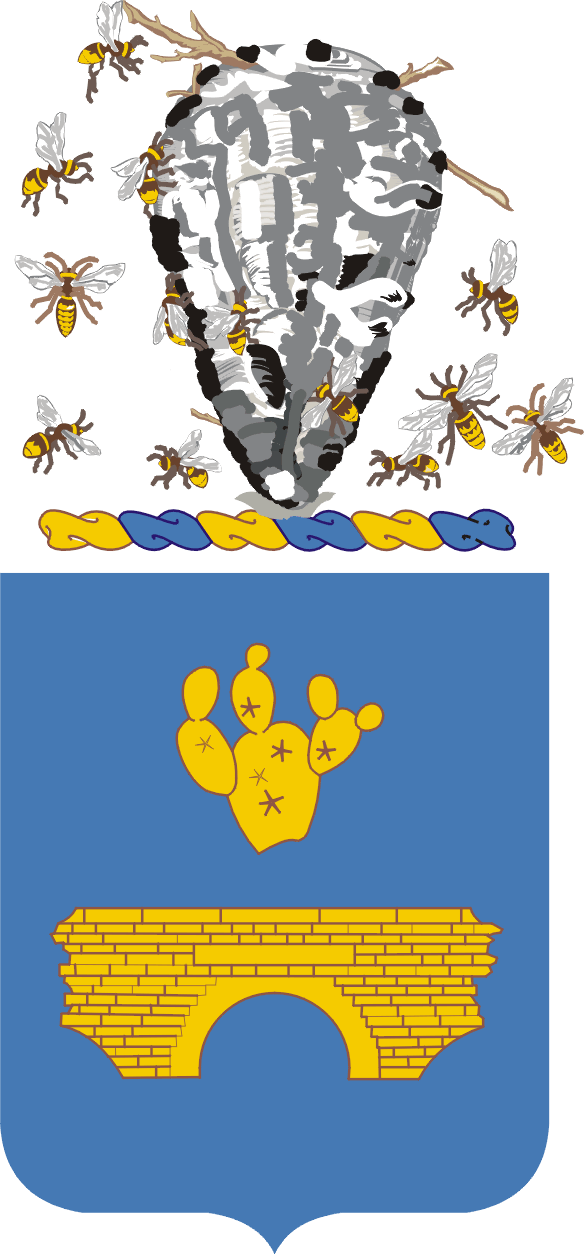
- Coat of arms
- Active: 1861-present
- Country: United States
- Branch: North Carolina Army National Guard
- Type: Infantry
- Role: Mechanized infantry
- Headquarters: Wilmington, North Carolina
- Nickname: Third North Carolina (special designation)
- Motto: Virtus Incendit Vires (Virtues Kindles Strength)
- Engagements: American Civil War -Bethel -North Carolina 1862 -Gettysburg -Wilderness -Spotsylvania -Petersburg -Appomattox; World War I -Ypres-Lys -Flanders; World War II -Normandy -Northern France -Rhineland -Ardennes-Alsace -Central Europe; Iraq Campaign

Commanders
- Notable commanders: John H. Manning; Branner P. Purdue

Insignia
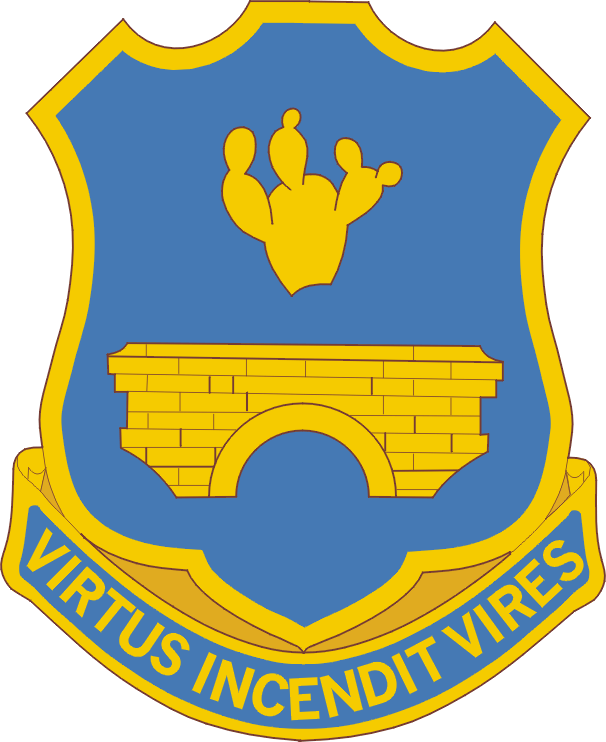
- Distinctive unit insignia

The 120th Infantry Regiment ("Third North Carolina") is an infantry regiment of the United States Army National Guard.

The unit is an organic element of the 30th Heavy Brigade Combat Team of the North Carolina Army National Guard. Currently, 1st and 2nd Battalions are the only active battalions in the regiment and are organized as combined arms battalions under the Brigade Unit of Action table of organization and equipment. The 1st Battalion, 120th Infantry Regiment (1-120th IN) is headquartered in Wilmington, North Carolina. The 2nd Battalion (2-120th IN) is headquartered in Lenoir, North Carolina.

The 2nd Battalion, 120th Infantry Regiment was most famous for its actions in the Battle of Mortain (German: Operation Lüttich), repelling a German advance and preserving an American breakout from 7–13 August 1944 as part of the 30th Infantry Division. The 2-120th's actions sustained the American initiative as Allied forces pushed through Northern France after the Normandy invasion.

== History ==
=== World War I ===
The 3rd Regiment of Infantry was called into Federal service on 25 July 1917 after the United States' entry into World War I. Drafted into service on 5 August, it became the 120th Infantry Regiment of the 30th Division on 12 September, while the 2nd Regiment of Infantry became the 119th Infantry. With the 30th Division, the 120th fought in the Somme Offensive, the Ypres-Lys offensive, and the Flanders campaign during the war. Both the 119th and 120th were demobilized at Camp Jackson, South Carolina on 17 April 1919, preceding the demobilization of the division headquarters there on 7 May.

=== Interwar period ===
Armories of the regiment in 1940

The 120th Infantry arrived at the port of Charleston, South Carolina, in April 1919 on the troopship USS Martha Washington and was demobilized on 17 April 1919 at Camp Jackson, South Carolina. Per the National Defense Act of 1920, it was reconstituted in the National Guard in 1921, assigned to the 30th Division, and allotted to the state of North Carolina. The regiment was reorganized on 8 November 1921 by redesignation of the 1st Infantry, North Carolina National Guard (organized 1919–20; headquarters organized 2 May 1921 and federally recognized at Graham, North Carolina) as the 120th Infantry. The regimental headquarters was relocated on 25 January 1937 to Raleigh, North Carolina. The regiment, or elements thereof, was called up to perform the following state duties: riot control for a race riot in Goldsboro, North Carolina, in 1920; riot control for the railroad strike throughout North Carolina, 17 July–31 August 1922; riot control for elections at Mayodan, North Carolina, in 1923; riot control for textile workers’ strike at Kannapolis, North Carolina, in 1923; riot control for workers’ strike at Pittsboro, North Carolina, in 1927; elements of 2nd and 3rd Battalions performed riot control for textile workers’ strike at Gastonia, North Carolina, in April 1929; riot control for textile workers’ strike in Burlington, North Carolina and Alamance County, North Carolina, 15–25 September 1934; riot control for textile workers’ strike at Reidsville, North Carolina, in September 1935. The regiment conducted annual summer training most years at Camp Glenn, North Carolina, near Morehead City, and some years at Camp Jackson, South Carolina.

=== World War II ===
Men of the 1st Battalion, 120th Infantry, 30th Infantry Division, move out from Pattern as they attack Altdorf. Fierce German resistance was encountered on this attack. November 27, 1944.

As a result of World War II, the regiment was inducted into Federal service at Raleigh on 16 September 1940. With the 30th Division, it fought in the Normandy campaign, the Northern France Campaign, the Rhineland Campaign, the Ardennes-Alsace Campaign, and the Central Europe Campaign. The 2nd Battalion and Company K received a Distinguished Unit Citation and Croix de Guerre with Palm for their actions in the Mortain counterattack, while the 1st Battalion received a DUC for the advance from Duffescheide to Euchen, Germany. After the end of the war, the regiment was inactivated at Fort Jackson, South Carolina, on 24 November 1945.

=== Cold War ===
Armories of the regiment in 1949

Postwar, the 120th Infantry was reorganized with the 30th Infantry Division in the North Carolina Army National Guard under the command of Shelby attorney Colonel Peyton McSwain, with its headquarters Federally recognized at Reidsville on 22 April 1947. Its previous 1st and 3rd Battalions were consolidated with the 119th Infantry Regiment. Through 1947 and 1948, the remainder of the regiment was reorganized and Federally recognized, based at armories in western North Carolina. Support units included a Service Company at Asheville, a Heavy Mortar Company at Leaksville, a Heavy Tank Company at Waynesville, and a Medical Company at Mocksville. The 1st Battalion, with headquarters at Mount Airy, included Company A at Burlington, Companies B and D at Winston-Salem, and Company C at Lexington. The 2nd Battalion, headquartered at Asheboro, included Company E at Concord, Company F at Albemarle, Company G at Salisbury, and Company H at Hickory. The 3rd Battalion, headquartered at Kings Mountain, included Company I at Newton, Company K at Gastonia, Company L at Morganton, and Company M at Shelby. The regiment participated in its first postwar summer training at Fort Bragg between 11 and 25 July 1948 with most of the 30th Division. After the camp it was estimated at 32% combat readiness by the senior army instructor of the North Carolina National Guard, which meant that in event of war it would not be combat ready for several months. The 1949 summer training was held at Fort Jackson between 14 and 28 August with the division, and the senior army instructor reported that, with 90 percent of the officers and 65 percent of the non-commissioned officers veterans of World War II, the regiment would be ready for combat in at least eight months in event of war.

Morganton school superintendent and 3rd Battalion commander Lieutenant Colonel Maston S. Parham was promoted to colonel and became regimental commander on 30 August 1950 following the retirement of McSwain. A 1954 reorganization of the 30th Infantry Division that made it an entirely North Carolina-manned force resulted in the 2 November promotion of Parham to assistant division commander and his replacement by Morganton Colonel Howell J. Hatcher. To bring the division up to strength, a new 139th Infantry Regiment was organized from existing units of the division, resulting in the redesignation of companies of the 120th and the conversion and organization of new units to bring the 120th back up to strength. The regimental Headquarters and Headquarters Company (HHC), the Heavy Mortar Company, and the HHC of 2nd Battalion transferred to the 139th, along with Companies A, F, and C, which became Companies E, F, and G, of the 139th, respectively. Company L of the 120th was redesignated as the regimental HHC, Battery A of the 112th Field Artillery Battalion (FAB) at Forest City was converted into the Heavy Mortar Company, and Companies G, K, I, and M became Companies C, F, G, and K, respectively. Battery B of the 112th FAB at Spindale was converted into the new Company M. The new Company L at Hendersonville activated on 8 February 1955, followed by 2nd Battalion HHC at Kannapolis on 15 February, Company I at Sylva on 14 April, and Company A at Elkin on 7 June.

== Recent history ==
The 1-120th, known as the "Tusk Hogs," were deployed to combat for the first time in nearly 60 years in early 2004 as part of the 30th Heavy Brigade Combat Team, North Carolina Army National Guard. In Iraq, the 30th HBCT served under the 1st Infantry Division. Brigade headquarters was at FOB Caldwell, east of Baghdad, while the 1-120th battalion headquarters and Charlie Company was based (for most of the deployment) at FOB Bernstein, about 45 miles south of Kirkuk. The brigade, including the 120th, redeployed Dec. 2004 – Feb. 2005.

On 6 June 2004 – 60 years after the D-Day invasion – soldiers of the 1-120th were awarded right-shoulder unit patches signifying wartime service.

The 1-120th lost four soldiers during the 2004 deployment: Specialist Jocelyn Carrasquillo (HHC/1-120th, 13 MAR 2004, Baghdad), Captain Christopher S. Cash (Commander, Alpha Company, 1-120th, 24 JUN 2004, Baqubah); Specialist Daniel A. Desens Jr. (A/1-120th, 24 JUN 2004, Baqubah); and Staff Sergeant Michael S. Voss (HHC/1-120th, 8 OCT 2004, near Kirkuk).

The Tusk Hogs were again called to serve in late 2008. Following training at Camp Shelby, Miss., and Fort Stewart, Ga., the 1st Battalion (Combined Arms), 120th Infantry Regiment deployed with the 30th HBCT to central Iraq in early 2009, this time under the 1st Cavalry Division. The 120th redeployed with the 30th HBCT in January–February 2010.

The 2-120th, known as the "Mountain Rifles" were reactivated on October 18th, 2026, in Lenoir, NC.

== Notable members ==
Francis S. Currey earned the Medal of Honor for his actions as a Sergeant in Company K, 120th Infantry Regiment, 30th Infantry Division. On 21 December 1944, in Malmedy, Belgium, Currey repeatedly exposed himself to hostile fire to attack the German forces and rescue five comrades who had been pinned down by enemy fire. He was awarded the Medal of Honor eight months later, on 17 August 1945.

Paul Luther Bolden earned the Medal of Honor as a staff sergeant in Company I, 120th Infantry Regiment, 30th Infantry Division. On 23 DEC 44, at Petit-Coo, Belgium, he and another soldier advanced on a German-held house. While his comrade provided covering fire from across the street, Bolden tossed grenades through a window, rushed to the door, and began firing. Wounded by the greatly superior number of German soldiers inside, he retreated from the house. Realizing that the Germans would not surrender, he returned to the house despite his serious wounds and killed the remaining soldiers. For these actions, he was awarded the Medal of Honor eight months later, on 30 August 1945.

Jack James Pendleton earned the Medal of Honor as a staff sergeant in Company I, 120th Infantry Regiment, 30th Infantry Division. On 12 OCT 44, in Bardenberg, Germany, Pendleton voluntarily led his squad in an attack against an enemy machine gun. After being seriously wounded, he continued forward alone, purposely drawing the machine gun's fire so that another squad could advance and destroy the enemy position. Killed by the intense fire from the machine gun, Pendleton was posthumously awarded the Medal of Honor six months later, on 6 April 1945.

Newscaster David Brinkley served with the 120th Infantry Regiment before and during the early stages of the U.S. involvement in World War II. He was discharged for a medical condition, which prevented him from serving in the war.

== Distinctive unit insignia ==
The 120th Infantry Regiment's distinctive unit insignia, approved on 28 June 1928, consists of a gold metal and enamel device 1 5/32 inches (2.9 cm) in height overall, consisting of a shield blazoned azure, in pale a prickly pear cactus and the entrance to the canal tunnel over the St. Quentin Canal. Attached below the shield is a blue scroll inscribed VIRTUS INCENDIT VIRES ("Virtue Kindles Strength") in gold.

The shield is blue for infantry. The cactus represents service on the Mexican border as the 3rd Infantry, North Carolina National Guard. The tunnel symbolizes the mouth of the tunnel in the Hindenburg Line at Bellicourt, France, captured by the 120th Infantry on 29 September 1918.
