= 252nd Armor Regiment =

Regiment of the North Carolina Army National Guard

252nd Combined Arms Battalion
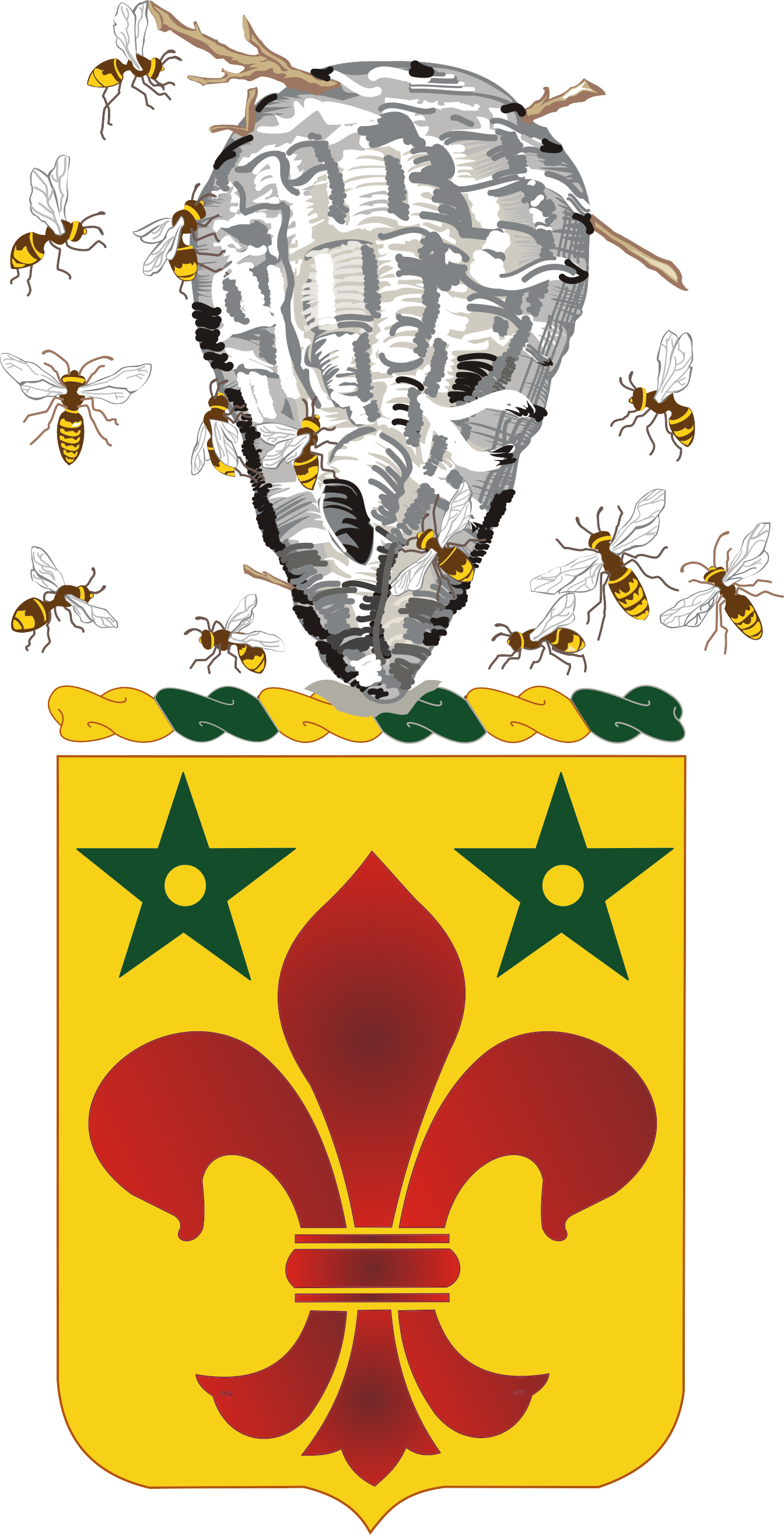
- 252nd Armor Regiment coat of arms
- Active: 1959–2026
- Country: United States
- Branch: North Carolina Army National Guard
- Type: Combined arms battalion
- Role: Mechanized Infantry/Armor
- Garrison/HQ: Fayetteville, North Carolina (Headquarters)
- Mottos: "Ready, Poised, Decisive"
- Engagements: Iraq War: Operation Iraqi Freedom Phase II

Insignia
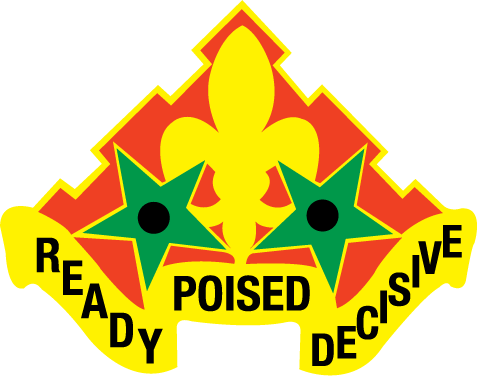
- DUI

The 252nd Armor Regiment was an armored regiment of the North Carolina Army National Guard, part of the 30th Armored Brigade Combat Team, part of the 29th Infantry Division. The 1st Battalion, 252nd Armor was the only active unit within the regiment, fielding two tank companies and one infantry company, stationed at various locations around North Carolina.

== History ==
The 252nd Armor Regiment was originally constituted on 20 March 1959 as the 196th Armor for the North Carolina Army National Guard as a parent regiment under the Combat Arms Regimental System and assigned to the 30th Infantry Division. Twelve days later, on 1 April 1959, 3rd Battalion, 139th Infantry Regiment and the 130th Tank Battalion, both from the 30th Infantry Division, were re-flagged and reassigned to the regiment as the 1st Reconnaissance Squadron and the 2nd Medium Tank Battalion, respectively. On 10 March 1963, the regiment was reorganized as the 252nd Armor Regiment, consisting of 1st and 2nd Battalions as elements of the 30th Infantry Division (concurrently, the former 196th Armor Regiment was reconstituted and reorganized from existing units of the North Carolina Army National Guard as the 196th Cavalry Regiment, hereafter a separate lineage).

After the 30th Infantry Division was reorganized as the 30th Infantry Brigade, the regiment was reorganized as well. On 1 December 1973, 1st Battalion was reorganized as an element of the 30th Infantry Brigade, while 2nd Battalion was reorganized as a separate armor battalion of the North Carolina Army National Guard, where it was later deactivated September 30, 1991. On 01 June 1989, the regiment was withdrawn from the Combat Arms Regimental System and reorganized under the United States Army Regimental System.

1st Battalion, 252nd Armor deployed with the rest of 30th Brigade for a year-long tour of duty to Iraq in February 2004. While this was the first combat deployment for the battalion as a whole, B Company had previously completed a six-month deployment to the Balkans from October 2000 to March 2001 with Task Force Eagle.

1st Battalion, 252nd Armor deployed back to Baghdad, Iraq on 18 April 2009 in support of Operation Iraqi Freedom 9. This was their second deployment as a battalion, but their first deployment as a brigade in whole. Over 4,000 soldiers were deployed and stationed throughout Baghdad. C Company, 1/252 CAB ran over 600 Combat missions during a 10-month period making them the most used unit in the Combat Arms perspective for the 30th Brigade. 2nd Platoon of C Company was hit on two separate occasions with Improvised explosive devices approximately 1 week apart. 3rd Platoon, C Company was ambushed north of FOB Falcon in the Saydiyah district. Over 10 insurgents were captured with no injuries or casualties to 3rd Platoon.

After redeploying from Iraq in 2005, the 30th Infantry Brigade began the process of converting from an enhanced heavy separate brigade to the new heavy brigade combat team table of organization and equipment. As part of this reorganization, the 1st Battalion was converted to a combined arms battalion. On 22 February 2026, the 1st Battalion was converted into the 1st Battalion, 119th Infantry Regiment.

== Lineage ==
- Constituted 20 March 1959 in the North Carolina Army National Guard as the 196th Armor, a parent regiment under the Combat Arms Regimental System
- Organized 1 April 1959 from existing units to consist of the 1st Reconnaissance Squadron and the 2d Medium Tank Battalion, elements of the 30th Infantry Division
- Reorganized and redesignated 10 March 1963 as the 252d Armor to consist of the 1st and 2d Battalions, elements of the 30th Infantry Division
- Reorganized 1 December 1973 to consist of the 1st Battalion, an element of the 30th Infantry Brigade, and the 2d Battalion
- Withdrawn 1 June 1989 from the Combat Arms Regimental System and reorganized under the United States Army Regimental System with Headquarters at Fayetteville
- Reorganized 1 September 1996 to consist of the 1st Battalion, an element of the 30th Infantry Brigade
- Ordered into active Federal service 1 October 2003 at home stations
- 30th Infantry Brigade converted, reorganized, and redesignated 1 September 2004 as the 30th Armored Brigade
- Released from active Federal service 28 March 2005 and reverted to state control
- Reorganized 1 September 2005 to consist of the 1st Battalion, an element of the 30th Armored Brigade Combat Team
- Redesignated 1 October 2005 as the 252d Armored Regiment
- Ordered into active Federal service 11 February 2009 at home stations; released from active Federal service 17 March 2010 and reverted to state control

== Organization ==
As of 2008, 1st Battalion had companies in the following locations in North Carolina:

- Headquarters and Headquarters Company (HHC) located in Fayetteville, North Carolina
- A Company (Armor) located in Parkton, North Carolina
- B Company (Armor) located in Southern Pines, North Carolina
- C Company (Infantry) located in Smithfield, North Carolina
- In addition to its four organic companies, 1-252nd Armor also received G Company (FSC) of the 230th Brigade Support Battalion as a habitual attachment.

== Distinctive unit insignia ==
- Description

A gold color metal and enamel device 1 1/8 inches (2.9 cm) in width consisting of a red embattled arrowhead charged with a gold fleur-de-lis flanked and surmounted on either side by a pierced green mullet. The device is supported by a tri-segmented gold scroll inscribed "READY" "POISED" "DECISIVE" in black letters.

- Symbolism

The pierced green mullets (simulating spur rowels) surmounting a gold fleur-de-lis represent service in Europe during World War II. The red embattled arrowhead simulates the spirit of the unit and is symbolic of the motto "Ready, Poised and Decisive". The red and green together refer to the decorations of the French Croix-de-Guerre and the Belgian Fourragere awarded to elements of the Regiment.

- Background

The distinctive unit insignia was approved on 16 November 1966. It was amended to change the symbolism on 29 January 1970.

== Coat of arms ==
- Blazon
  - Shield: Or, a fleur-de-lis Gules between in chief two mullets Vert pierced of the field.
  - Crest: That for the regiments and separate battalions of the North Carolina Army National Guard: On a wreath of the colors Or and Vert, a hornet's nest handing from a bough beset with 13 hornets all Proper.
  - Motto: "Ready, Poised, Decisive"
- Symbolism
  - Yellow is the color used to denote Armor and the pierced mullets simulate spur rowels and refer to service in World War II. The fleur-de-lis alludes to France and Italy and represents the World War II campaigns in those countries. The colors red and green refer to the decorations of the French Croix-de-Guerre and the Belgian Fourragere awarded to elements of the Regiment.
  - Crest: The crest is that of the North Carolina Army National Guard.
- Background: The coat of arms was approved on 7 July 1966. It was amended to change the symbolism on 29 January 1970.

== See also ==
- List of armored and cavalry regiments of the United States Army
