= Sommedieue =

- Commune
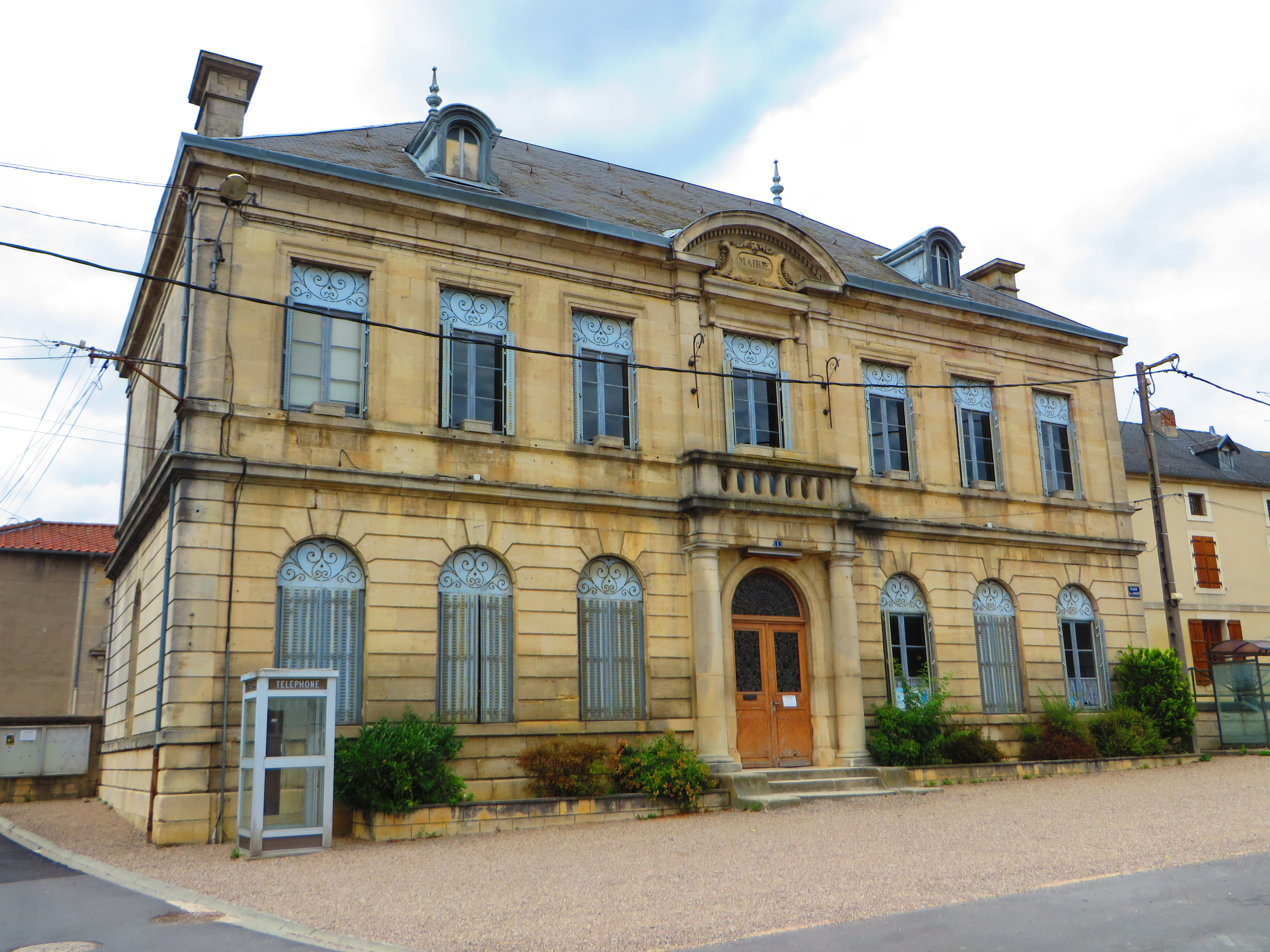
- The town hall in Sommedieue
- Location of Sommedieue
- Location within France Location within Grand Est
- Coordinates: 49°05′09″N 5°27′51″E
- Country: France
- Region: Grand Est
- Department: Meuse
- Arrondissement: Verdun
- Canton: Dieue-sur-Meuse

Government
  - Mayor (2020–2026): Daniel Sanzey
- Area^{1}: 33.63 km^{2} (12.98 sq mi)
- Elevation: 320 m (1,050 ft)
- Highest elevation: 392 m (1,286 ft)
- Lowest elevation: 215 m (705 ft)
- Population (2023): 944
  - Density: 28.1/km^{2} (72.7/sq mi)
- Time zone: UTC+01:00 (CET)
  - Summer (DST): UTC+02:00 (CEST)
- INSEE/Postal code: 55492 /55320
- ^{1} French Land Register data, which excludes lakes, ponds, glaciers > 1 km^{2} (0.386 sq mi or 247 acres) and river estuaries.

Sommedieue (French pronunciation: [sɔmdjø]) is a commune in the Meuse department in Grand Est in north-eastern France.

== See also ==
- Communes of the Meuse department
- Parc naturel régional de Lorraine
