= 230th Light Support Battalion =

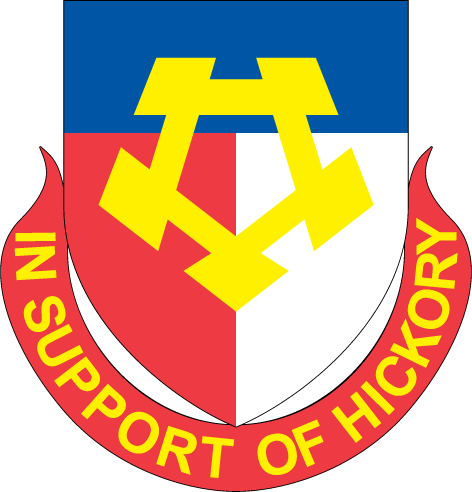
- Distinctive Unit Insignia
- Country: United States
- Branch: North Carolina Army National Guard
- Role: Light Support Battalion
- Size: Approx. 500
- Part of: 30th Heavy Brigade Combat Team
- Engagements: Iraq War -Operation Iraqi Freedom Phase II

The 230th Light Support Battalion is a support unit of the 30th Mobile Brigade Combat Team, North Carolina Army National Guard. Battalion headquarters is at Goldsboro, North Carolina. The 230th BSB currently has companies in the following locations in North Carolina, West Virginia and South Carolina:

- Headquarters and Headquarters Company (HHC) is located in Goldsboro, North Carolina
- A Company is located in Benson, North Carolina
- B Company is located in Dunn, North Carolina
- C Company is located in Goldsboro, North Carolina
- D Company is part of the West Virginia Army National Guard and is located in Glen Jean, West Virginia
- E Company is located in Durham, North Carolina
- F Company is located in High Point, North Carolina
- G Company is located in Red Springs, North Carolina
- H Company, located in Greer, South Carolina is part of the 4-118th in the SCARNG.

== Alpha Company, 230th Light Support Battalion ==
Alpha Company 230th Light Support Battalion is located in Benson, North Carolina and consists of the following sections: Transportation Platoon, Fluids Platoon, Supply Platoon.

=== Transportation Platoon ===
The Transportation Platoon supervises or operates wheel vehicles to transport personnel and cargo for the 30th HBCT.

=== Fluids Platoon ===
The Fluids platoon is made up of a Water section and Petroleum, Oils, and Lubricants (POL) Section. The petroleum supply specialist supervises or receives, stores, accounts for and cares for, dispenses, issues, and ships bulk or packaged petroleum, oils, and lubricants (POL) products for 30th HBCT. The water treatment specialist supervises or performs installation, operation of water purification equipment, water storage and distribution operations and activities for 30th HBCT.

=== Supply Platoon ===
The supply platoon is made up of 89B Ammunition Specialists and 92Y Unit Supply Specialists.

== Bravo Company, 230th Light Support Battalion ==
Bravo Company 230th Light Support Battalion is located in Dunn, North Carolina and is made up of mechanical maintenance for military vehicles and equipment.

== Charlie Company, 230th Light Support Battalion ==
Charlie Company 230th Light Support Battalion is located in Goldsboro, North Carolina and is capable of providing role two medical support for the 30th ABCT. Charlie Med consists of PA's, RN's, Physical Therapists, Medics, Dentists, Mental Health, X-ray and Dental Techs and is capable of providing life saving and preventative medicine. Charlie Medical Company is highly mobile and performs its function as a role II provider in appropriate tent structure in the field and hard structure in cantonment environment. Charlie Company is called Charlie Med Cowboy Life Savers.

Charlie Med is made up of three platoons:

=== Headquarters Platoon ===
Headquarters platoon is made up of the command and support staff. Including Maintenance, Supply, Communications, NBC, Mental Health, Pharmacy, and Environmental Health.

=== Treatment Platoon ===
Treatment platoon is composed of several sections of medical treatment. From the emergency medical treatment section which establishes emergency medical operations, to the X-Ray, lab, and medical hold specialists teams that treat, evaluate and monitor the patients.

=== Ambulance Platoon ===
Ambulance platoon is composed of multiple teams of medical evacuation specialists. These teams operate M-997 Front Line ambulances, and M113 Armored Ambulances.

== Insignia ==
=== Shoulder sleeve insignia (SSI) ===
30th ID's SSI

Description: The letters "O H" blue upon a red background, the "O" forming the elliptical outline of the device long axis to be 2 1/2 inches (6.4 cm) and short axis 1 5/8 inches (4.1 cm). The letter "H" within the "O". The letters "XXX" on the bar of the "H". The insignia to be worn with long axis vertical.

Symbolism: The letters "O H" are the initials of "Old Hickory", the nickname of the 30th Infantry Division, and the "XXX" is the Roman notation for the number of the organization.

Background: The shoulder sleeve insignia was originally approved on 23 October 1918 for the 30th Division. It was redesignated for the 30th Infantry Brigade on 20 February 1974. The insignia was redesignated effective 1 September 2004, with description updated, for the 30th Brigade Combat Team, North Carolina Army National Guard.
