= 197th Regiment =

197th Regiment may refer to:

- 197th Field Artillery Regiment, United States
- 197th Heavy Anti-Aircraft Battery, Royal Artillery, Britain
- 197th Ohio Infantry Regiment, Union Army
- 197th Pennsylvania Infantry Regiment, Union Army

== See also ==
- 197th Division (disambiguation)
- 197th (disambiguation)
