= Task Force Trailblazer =

US Department of Defense task force

- Operational scope: Aviation Support
- Planned by: United States Department of Defense
- Objective: Provide Aviation Support

Task Force Trailblazer is a United States Department of Defense Task force which provides aviation support to ground commanders throughout the Middle East.

== Structure ==
- 18.1 = 449th Combat Aviation Brigade
- 18.2 = 35th Combat Aviation Brigade
  - HHC
  - 935th Aviation Support Battalion
  - 1st Assault Helicopter Battalion, 108th Aviation Regiment (1-108 AHB)
  - 2d General Support Assault Battalion, 211th Aviation Regiment (2-211 GSAB)
  - 4th Attack Reconnaissance Battalion, 4th Aviation Regiment (4-4 ARB)
  - 1st Attack Reconnaissance Battalion, 1st Aviation Regiment (1-1 ARB)
  - F Company, 1st Battalion, 227th Aviation Regiment (1-227 AVN)
  - D Company, 10th Aviation Regiment (D-10 AVN)
