= 197th Brigade =

197th Brigade may refer to:

- 197th (Lancashire Fusiliers) Brigade, United Kingdom
- 197th Field Artillery Brigade, United States
- 197th Infantry Brigade (United States)

== See also ==
- 197th Division (disambiguation)
- 197th Regiment (disambiguation)
