= Thomas F. Spencer =

US Army major general born 1964

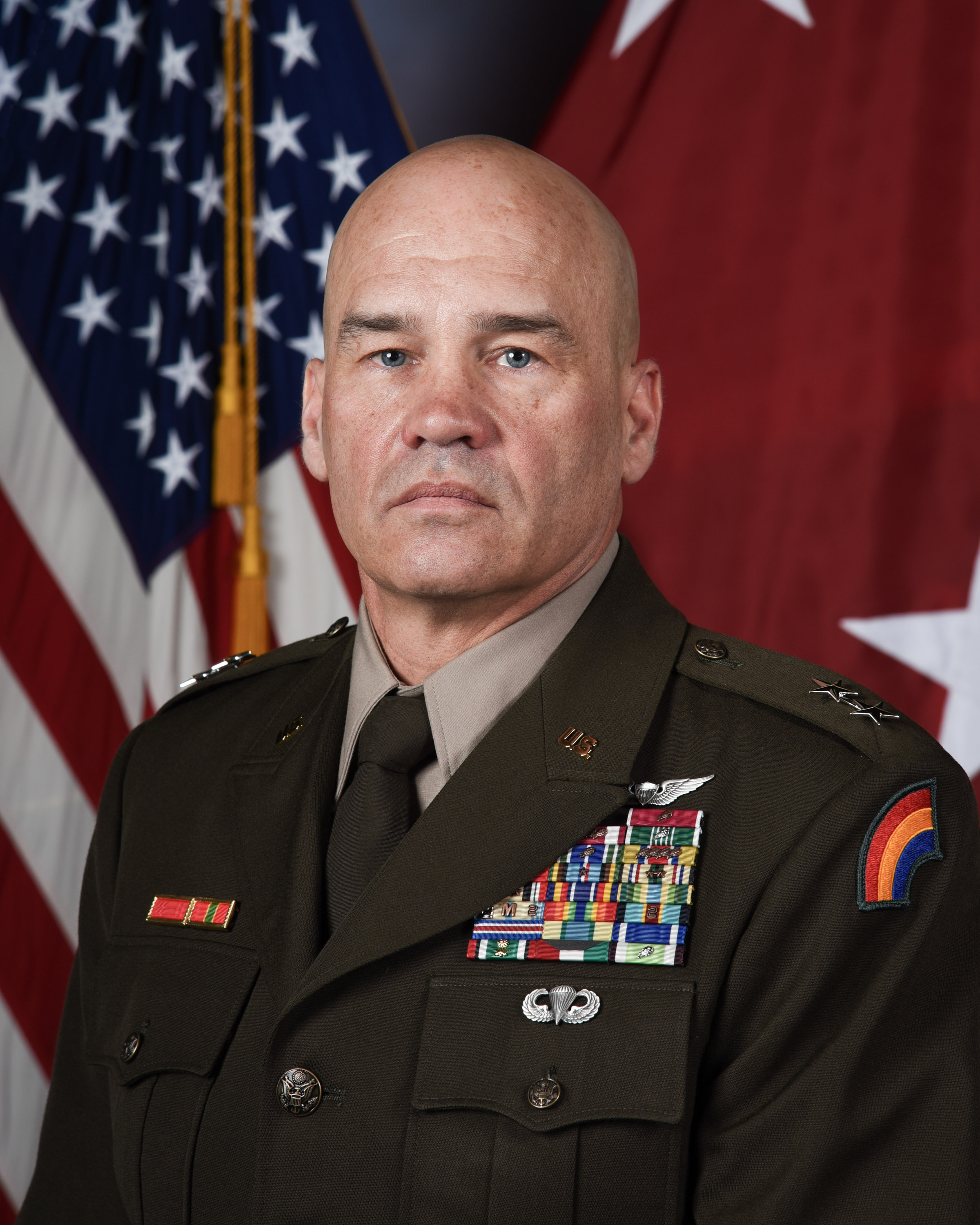
- Spencer as commander of the 42nd Infantry Division in 2021
- Born: 1964 (age 61–62)
- Alma mater: University of Southern Maine; United States Army Command and General Staff College; United States Army War College
- Spouse: Wendy E. Normandeau (m. 1988)
- Children: 3
- Military career
- Service: United States Army
- Service years: 1987–2023
- Rank: Major General
- Units: US Army Field Artillery Branch; US Army Aviation Branch
- Commands: Company B, 4th Battalion, 4th Aviation Regiment; Battery A, 1st Battalion, 172nd Field Artillery Regiment; 3rd Battalion, 197th Field Artillery Brigade; Rear Detachment, 197th Field Artillery Brigade; 197th Field Artillery Brigade; 42nd Infantry Division
- Conflicts: Gulf War; Operation Restore Hope; Operation Joint Endeavor; Iraq War; Operation Spartan Shield
- Awards: Army Distinguished Service Medal; Legion of Merit (3); Meritorious Service Medal (4); Army Commendation Medal (6); Army Achievement Medal (2); Complete List
- Other work: Pharmaceutical sales manager

Thomas F. Spencer (b. 1964) is a retired United States Army officer from York, Maine. A veteran of the Gulf War, Operation Restore Hope, Operation Joint Endeavor, Iraq War, and Operation Spartan Shield, he served from 1987 to 2023 and attained the rank of major general as commander of the 42nd Infantry Division. Spencer's awards and decorations include the Army Distinguished Service Medal and multiple awards of the Legion of Merit, Meritorious Service Medal, Army Commendation Medal, and Army Achievement Medal.

== Early life and start of career ==
Spencer was born in 1964 and is a 1983 graduate of Marshwood High School, which was then located in Eliot, Maine. In 1987, he received his Bachelor of Arts degree in political science from the University of Southern Maine. Spencer participated in the Reserve Officers' Training Corps while in college, and at graduation he received his United States Army commission as a second lieutenant of Field Artillery. He attended the Field Artillery Officer Basic Course at Fort Sill, Oklahoma from September 1987 to February 1989, then was assigned as executive officer of Battery A, 1-31st Field Artillery, also at Fort Sill. He remained in this position until January 1990.

=== Military education ===
Spencer's military courses include:

- Field Artillery Officer Basic Course
- United States Army Airborne School
- Aviation Officer Advanced Course
- Initial Entry Rotary Wing Training
- United States Army Command and General Staff College
- United States Army War College (Master of Strategic Studies)
- Army Strategic Education Program – Basic (ASEP–B)
- Army Strategic Education Program – Command (ASEP–C)

Spencer is rated as an Army Aviator with over 700 flight hours. He has flown the UH-60A (Blackhawk) and UH-1 (Huey).

== Continued career ==
From January 1990 to June 1990, Spencer was assigned as fire direction officer with Fort Sill's Battery A, 2-18th Field Artillery Battalion, a unit of the 212th Field Artillery Brigade. He was a platoon leader with Battery A from June 1990 to March 1991, which included deployment to Saudi Arabia and Iraq during Operation Desert Shield and Operation Desert Storm. From March 1991 to February 1992, he attended the Initial Entry Rotary Wing Aviator course at Fort Rucker, Alabama, and he attended the Aviation Officer Advanced Course at Fort Rucker from February to August 1992. He was then assigned as assistant plans, training and operations officer (Assistant S-3) with the 4th Aviation Battalion at Fort Carson, Colorado, where he remained until January 1993.

In October 1993, Spencer was assigned as logistics staff officer (S-4) for 4th Battalion. From October 1993 to January 1995, he commanded Company B, 4th Aviation Battalion, including deployment to Somalia for Operation Restore Hope. Spencer was assigned as assistant plans, training and operations officer (G-3 Air) with the 1st Armored Division in Bad Kreuznach, Germany from January to December 1995. He served as assistant aviation officer for the 1st Armored Division's forward headquarters in Bosnia during Operation Joint Endeavor from December 1995 to December 1996. He then returned to the G-3 Air position in Germany, where he remained until September 1997.

== Later career ==
Spencer left active duty in 1997 and began a career in pharmaceutical sales and sales management, including positions with companies including Pfizer and Astellas Pharma. In September 1998, he returned to military service as a member of the New Hampshire Army National Guard and was assigned as commander of Battery A, 1st Battalion, 172nd Field Artillery Regiment in Milford, New Hampshire. In September 1999, he was assigned as the battalion's assistant S-3, and in September 2000 he moved into the S-3 position. In September 2001, he was appointed as the battalion's executive officer in Manchester, New Hampshire. In July 2002 he was assigned as S-3 of the 197th Field Artillery Brigade in Manchester, including overseas deployment for the Iraq War.

In March 2007, Spencer was assigned as the 197th Field Artillery Brigade's executive officer and in March 2008 he was appointed to command the brigade's 3rd Battalion. In February 2010, he was assigned as commander of the brigade's rear detachment during its overseas deployment to the Middle East. From September 2011 to March 2015, he commanded the brigade. From March 2015 to March 2018, Spencer served as New Hampshire's assistant adjutant general for army. From March 2018 to December 2020, he was the 42nd Infantry Division's assistant division commander for support in Troy, New York. From August 2019 to February 2020, he served simultaneously as deputy commander for Army National Guard field artillery at the Fort Sill Fires Center of Excellence. Spencer's assignment as assistant division commander also included deployment to Kuwait from March 2020 to January 2021 for Operation Spartan Shield. In January 2021, he was assigned as commander of the 42nd Infantry Division, succeeding Steven Ferrari, and he served until retiring in December 2023. His retirement was commemorated at an early 2024 change of command ceremony, in which his successor Joseph L. Biehler assumed leadership of the division. Among his post-retirement activities was serving as chair of York, Maine's Committee for Veterans' Affairs.

== Awards ==
Spencer's awards and decorations included:

- Army Distinguished Service Medal
- Legion of Merit with 2 bronze oak leaf clusters
- Meritorious Service Medal with 3 bronze oak leaf clusters
- Army Commendation Medal with 1 silver oak leaf cluster
- Army Achievement Medal with 1 bronze oak leaf cluster
- Army Meritorious Unit Commendation
- Army Superior Unit Award
- National Defense Service Medal with 1 bronze service star
- Army Reserve Components Achievement Medal with 4 bronze oak leaf clusters
- Armed Forces Expeditionary Medal with 1 bronze service star
- Southwest Asia Service Medal with 2 bronze service stars
- Iraq Campaign Medal with 2 bronze service stars
- Global War on Terrorism Service Medal
- Armed Forces Service Medal
- Armed Forces Reserve Medal with silver hourglass, "M" device and numeral 2
- Army Service Ribbon
- Overseas Service Ribbon with Numeral 2
- Army Reserve Components Overseas Training Ribbon
- North Atlantic Treaty Organization Medal
- Kuwait Liberation Medal (Saudi Arabia)
- Kuwait Liberation Medal (Kuwait)
- Army Aviator Badge
- Parachutist Badge
- New York Military Commendation Medal
- New Hampshire National Guard State Active Service Ribbon with numeral 2
- New Hampshire National Guard Service Ribbon with 1 silver oak leaf cluster

Spencer was also a recipient of the Army Aviation Association of America's Order of Saint Michael (Bronze).

== Dates of rank ==
Spencer's dates of rank were:

- Major General, 1 January 2021
- Brigadier General, 28 April 2016
- Colonel, 29 September 2010
- Lieutenant Colonel, 6 April 2006
- Major, 1 October 2001
- Captain, 1 March 1992
- First Lieutenant, 9 September 1989
- Second Lieutenant, 9 May 1987
