= 197th =

197th may refer to:

- 197th (Lancashire Fusiliers) Brigade, formation of the British Army during the First World War
- 197th Air Refueling Squadron, unit of the Arizona Air National Guard 161st Air Refueling Wing
- 197th Battalion (Vikings of Canada), CEF, unit in the Canadian Expeditionary Force during the First World War
- 197th Division (People's Republic of China), military formation of the Chinese People's Volunteer Army
- 197th Field Artillery Regiment, regiment in the New Hampshire Army National Guard
- 197th Fires Brigade ("Concord Volunteers"), field artillery brigade of the New Hampshire Army National Guard
- 197th Infantry Brigade (United States) ("Sledgehammer"), Infantry brigade of the United States Army
- 197th Infantry Division (Wehrmacht), German division in World War II
- 197th Ohio Infantry (or 197th OVI), infantry regiment in the Union Army during the American Civil War
- 197th Street (Manhattan)
- Pennsylvania's 197th Representative District
- Ruby Junction/E 197th Avenue, MAX light rail station in Gresham, Oregon

== See also ==
- 197 (number)
- AD 197, the year 197 (CXCVII) of the Julian calendar
- 197 BC
