= Raleigh–Durham International Airport =

Airport serving Raleigh and Durham, North Carolina

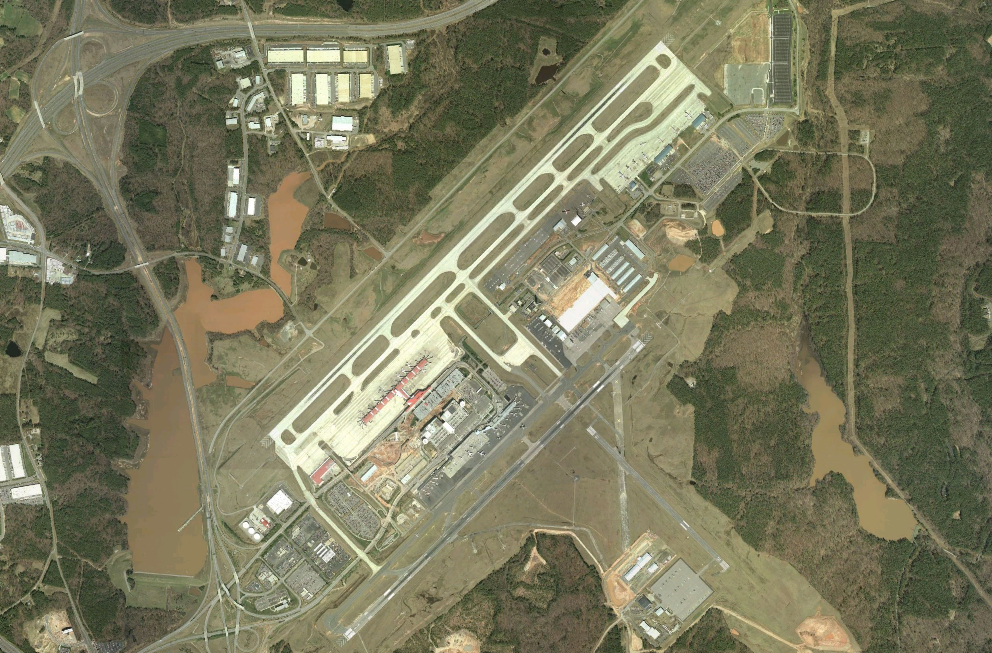
- IATA: RDU; ICAO: KRDU; FAA LID: RDU; WMO: 72306

Summary
- Airport type: Public
- Owner/Operator: Raleigh–Durham Airport Authority
- Serves: The Research Triangle Metropolitan Region of North Carolina
- Location: Cedar Fork Township, Wake County, North Carolina, U.S.
- Opened: May 1, 1943; 83 years ago
- Focus city for: Delta Air Lines
- Operating base for: Breeze Airways
- Time zone: EST (UTC−05:00)
  - Summer (DST): EDT (UTC−04:00)
- Elevation AMSL: 436 ft (133 m)
- Coordinates: 35°52′40″N 078°47′15″W
- Public transit access: GoTriangle: RDU, 100
- Website: rdu.com

Maps
- FAA airport diagram
- Interactive map of Raleigh–Durham; International Airport

Runways
| Direction | Length | | Surface |
| Direction | ft | m | Surface |
|---|---|---|---|
| 05L/23R | 10,000 | 3,048 | Concrete |
| 05R/23L | 7,500 | 2,286 | Asphalt |
| 14/32 | 3,570 | 1,088 | Asphalt |
| 05L/23R | 10,639 | 3,243 | Under construction (concrete) |

Statistics (2025)
- Total passengers: 15,644,658 ▲0.11%
- Aircraft movements: 218,737
- Air Cargo (lbs.): 175,332,528
- Sources: RDU website

Raleigh–Durham International Airport (IATA: RDU, ICAO: KRDU, FAA LID: RDU), locally known by its IATA code RDU, is an international airport that serves Raleigh, Durham, and the surrounding Research Triangle region of North Carolina as its main airport. It is located in unincorporated Wake County, but is surrounded by the city of Raleigh to the north and east, and the towns of Cary and Morrisville to the south. The airport covers 5,000 acres (20 km^{2}) and has three runways.

As of 2026, RDU ranks 34th in passenger arrivals and departures in the U.S. There are 24 carriers providing passenger service to over 90 destinations, including 15 international destinations in 12 countries. It was the 34th busiest U.S. airport by international passenger traffic in December 2025. The airport serves 32 U.S. states, plus Puerto Rico, with Atlanta being the busiest domestic route, and New York metropolitan area having the most passengers per day. As of 2025, Delta Air Lines has the largest market share, and Breeze Airways flies to the most destinations with 44. There are nearly 600 daily aircraft operations. The RDU Airport Authority is in charge of the airport facilities and operations and is controlled by a board of representatives from the counties of Wake & Durham plus the cities of Raleigh & Durham.

RDU is the second-largest airport in the state of North Carolina, behind Charlotte Douglas International Airport. The main catchment area comprises central and eastern North Carolina as well as parts of southern Virginia. The airport is an operating base for Breeze and Endeavor Air, as well as a focus city for Delta Air Lines. Breeze considers the area a key market.

In 2025, RDU served a record 15.6 million passengers, which broke the airport's 2024 record of 15.5 million passengers.

== History ==
=== Founding ===
Early view of Raleigh–Durham Airport

The region's first airport opened in 1929 as Raleigh Municipal Airport, in South Raleigh. It was quickly outgrown, and in 1939 the North Carolina General Assembly chartered the Raleigh–Durham Aeronautical Authority to build and operate a larger airport between Raleigh and Durham. This was promoted by Eastern Air Lines, led by then chairman Eddie Rickenbacker.

The new Raleigh–Durham Airport opened on May 1, 1943, with flights by Eastern Airlines. The passenger terminal was built from materials remaining after the construction of four barracks for the Army Air Forces Air Technical Service Command airfield. The three runways the airport had in 1951 are still visible on the southeast side of the airport: 4500-ft runway 5, 4500-ft runway 18 and 4490-ft runway 14.

After World War II, Capital Airlines joined Eastern at RDU; Piedmont Airlines arrived in 1948. The original Terminal 1 building was constructed in 1955, that previously served as a temporary structure for barracks for the prior United States Army air field. The April 1957 Official Airline Guide shows 36 departures a day: twenty Eastern, eight Capital and eight Piedmont. Nonstop flights did not reach beyond Washington, Atlanta, or the Appalachians (but Eastern started a Super Constellation nonstop to Newark in 1958). The next airline (aside from United's takeover of Capital in 1961) was Delta Air Lines in 1970. In April 1969, nonstops didn't reach beyond New York or Atlanta, and Chicago was the only nonstop west of the Appalachians. RDU's first scheduled jets were Eastern 727s in 1965.

Like many airports in the southern United States, it was operated as segregated facility with separate waiting areas for "White" and "Colored" people. It was later desegregated in the 1960s in response to protests by students at local universities.

In the 1970s, the last decade before airline deregulation, Piedmont connected RDU to the North Carolina cities of Asheville, Charlotte, Greensboro, New Bern, Rocky Mount, Winston-Salem, and Wilmington. It also connected to Norfolk, Virginia; Richmond, Virginia; and Washington, among others. United flew to Asheville, Charlotte, Huntsville, and Newark, while Eastern flew to Atlanta, Charlotte, Miami, New York, Philadelphia, Richmond, and Washington, and Delta flew to Chicago and Greensboro.

After deregulation, Allegheny Airlines arrived in 1979, Trans World Airlines in 1984, and by 1985 American Airlines, Ozark Air Lines, People Express, New York Air and Pan Am had all put in appearances.

Terminal 1, previously known as Terminal A, was first opened in 1982. Runway 5L/23R was completed in 1986.

=== Hub years ===
American Airlines (AA) built a terminal at RDU between 1985 and 1987 to house a new hub, and flew to 38 cities when the hub started in June 1987. The December 1987 timetable shows AA nonstops to 36 airports and American Eagle prop nonstops to 18 more. In 1988, the first international destination was Paris-Orly with AA. Caribbean destinations started in 1989, with routes to Bermuda, Cancún, St. Croix and St. Thomas. The RDU hub operated at a loss even during its heyday in the early 1990s, like the hub AA had at Nashville. AA's December 1992 timetable, around the time of the hub's peak, showed 211 daily departures to 64 destinations, almost all in the eastern United States (the westernmost destinations being AA's hubs at Dallas/Fort Worth and Chicago–O'Hare). The hub faced intense competition from Delta and Eastern in Atlanta, Northwest in Memphis, and from USAir in Charlotte, as well as the short-lived Continental hub in Greensboro that opened in 1993. AA began to consider closing the hub in late 1993. AA started serving London-Gatwick and discontinuing the Paris flight in 1994. The London route was originally launched based on a purchasing commitment from GlaxoSmithKline, which has major offices at both ends of the route; the route is no longer dependent on GSK for revenue. AA operations were reduced until June 1995 when they closed the hub. After the hub closure, the airport brought in four new airlines: Air South, Continental Airlines, ValuJet and Midway Airlines. In 1996, Air Canada became the airport's first international carrier with service to Toronto. Canadian Regional Airlines also started service to Toronto in 1997. Other brief international airports served via AA between late 1980s and mid 1990s include Grand Cayman, Nassau, and Saint Maarten.

Midway Airlines replaced AA as the airport's hub carrier from 1995 until 2003. In 1995, Midway had flights to Boston, Hartford, Long Island, Newark, in the Northeast; and to Fort Lauderdale, Jacksonville, Orlando, Tampa and West Palm Beach in Florida. They also served Cancún. AA subleased its gates at RDU to Midway in order to repay $113 million in AA-guaranteed bonds that had been used to construct the hub facilities. Midway suspended service for some time after the September 11, 2001 attacks, and ceased operations in 2002, filing for bankruptcy in 2003. US Airways Club opened in 2001. The United Service Organizations opened a lounge in 2004. The airport was briefly considered for a FedEx hub in 2006 before eventually opening at Piedmont Triad International Airport in Greensboro, North Carolina.

=== Recent history ===
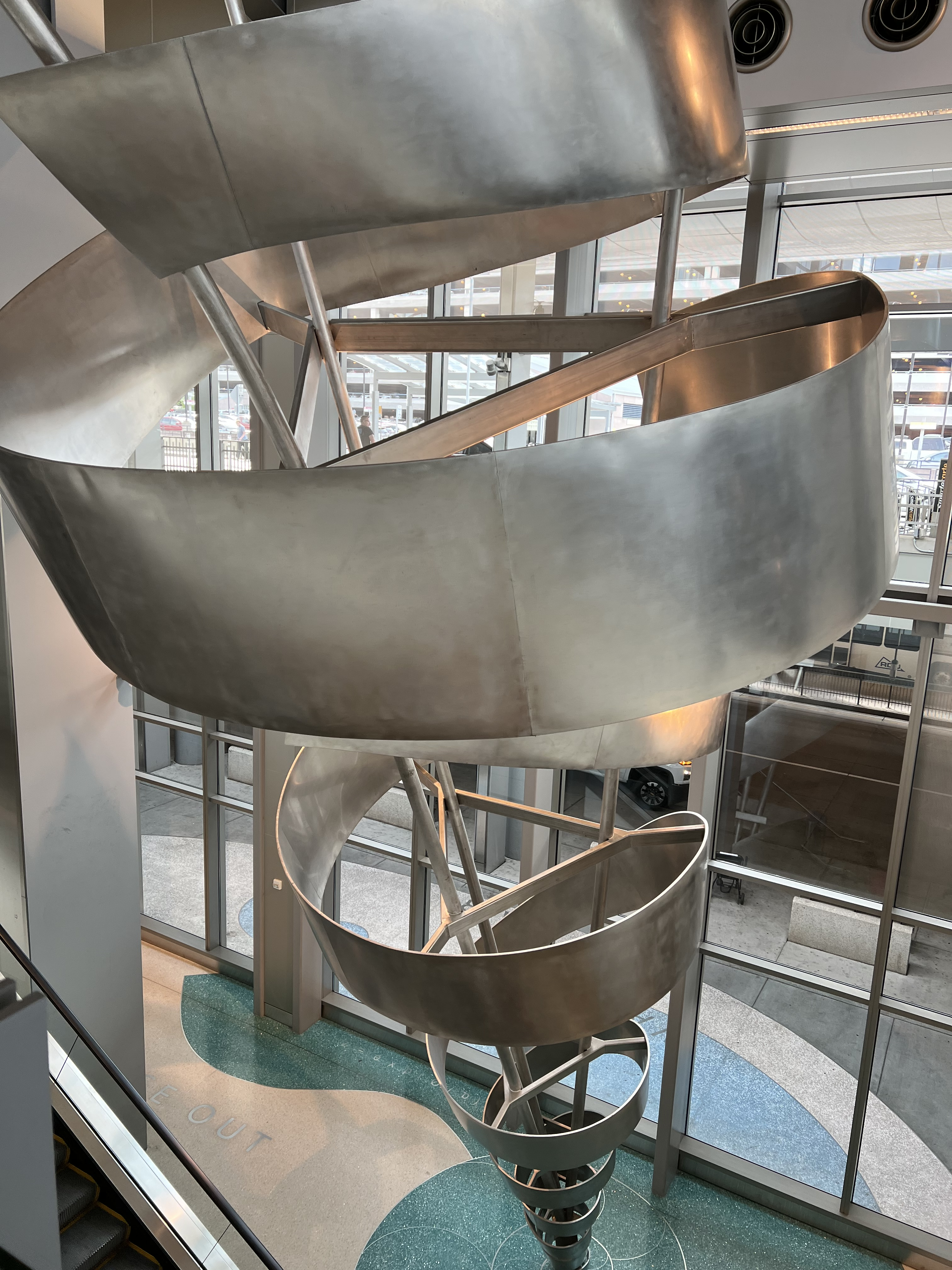
RDU Airport structure

RDU's post-hub years have brought the addition of new carriers and destinations, notably discount carriers such as Allegiant Air, Southwest Airlines and Frontier Airlines. Because of the economic downturn and high fuel prices in 2008, American ended most point to point flights it operated out of the airport. Several mainline flights were also dropped and service to other cities was reduced or downgraded. Other airlines also cut flights and destinations including United Airlines and US Airways. AA moved to London-Heathrow from Gatwick in 2008. Also in 2008, the airport was modernized; the current rebuilt Terminal 2 opened, on the site of the old Terminal C that was built in 1987. The rebuild was completed in 2011, and was designed by Fentress Architects. AA Admirals Club moved to Terminal 2 in 2008, with the rest of AA moving operations to that terminal. Delta Sky Club opened in 2009, and expanded in 2016.

By 2010, RDU's traffic began to recover. In the first few months of the year, passenger numbers stabilized at RDU, ending the decrease the airport experienced in 2008 and 2009. In the first four months of 2010, 2.7 million passengers traveled through RDU. Growth was flat compared to the same period a year before, but these signs were positive indicating that the decline was over. Airlines at RDU began to add new services to the schedule with both legacy and low-cost carriers significantly increasing service since the early 2010s. Terminal 1 was renovated in 2014. The US Airways Club merged with the Admiral Club also that year when US Airways merged with AA. The airport restarted Paris service, this time to Paris–Charles de Gaulle in 2016 with Delta.

In 2018, Delta Air Lines named the airport a focus city, which it decided to maintain in the wake of the COVID-19 pandemic due to the area's strong economy and lack of a dominant network carrier. Delta also maintains a satellite flight attendants base. The United Club opened in 2019, which is the airport's third passenger lounge. Also that year, Air Canada Express started service to Montréal–Trudeau.

All international flights were cancelled in 2020, due to COVID-19. The AA flight attendant base transitioned to a satellite base, in 2021. Both AA to Heathrow and Delta to Paris restarted in 2022. Also in 2022, Icelandair started service to Reykjavík–Keflavík.

In November 2022, Avelo Airlines announced the opening of an operating base at the airport, with service started on February 15, 2023. The airline closed the base on January 28, 2026.

Air France took over Paris service from Delta in 2023. In 2024, expansion occurred with service to Mexico City via Aeroméxico Connect; Panama City–Tocumen via Copa Airlines; and Frankfurt via Lufthansa. In 2025, the largest international expansion occurred with service to Toronto and Vancouver via mainline Air Canada; Montego Bay and Punta Cana via Avelo Airlines; and Cancún via Aeroméxico. Also, BermudAir briefly served Bermuda and WestJet served Calgary.

Endeavor Air, a regional airline for Delta, opened a crew base in the spring of 2025, with expected 130 to 170 employees. The base also supports over 140 aircraft. The airport became a gateway in 2025, allowing for interlining between Southwest and Icelandair. Additionally, RDU started its fifth European flight with nonstop flights to Dublin in the spring 2026 via Aer Lingus. Breeze opened an operating base in March 2026, with planned 200 pilots & flight attendants. Additional southern international expansion occurred in 2026, including Belize City & Providenciales via BermudAir, and Guadalajara via Volaris. A Pepsi customer lounge is being constructed in Terminal 2. Another interline agreement, between Alaska Airlines & Breeze, was formalized in October 2026.

=== Future ===
The Vision 2040 Master Plan details several major improvements that are aimed to be made by 2040. Proposed in 2017 by the RDU Airport Authority, the plan calls for major additions and renovations of current facilities at the airport. This includes the expansion of parking lots, expansion of both terminals, improvements to the taxiway layout, and the replacement 5L/23R runway. Terminal 1 is planned to expand to 24 gates, while Terminal 2 is planned to expand to 53 gates, with expected completion in 2032. The existing runway 5L/23R will become a taxiway for the new runway. After modifying the planned runway length multiple times, the Federal Aviation Administration authorized the construction of the new runway on September 5, 2023. The construction of RDU's new 5L/23R runway began on October 11, 2023. The new runway will be built at a length of 10,639 feet (3,243 m), and is anticipated to start paving in 2027, to be finished in 2029.

In June 2023, the Airport Authority Board approved an agreement to advance the planning process for Terminal 1 expansion to allow for future growth as RDU reached new passenger traffic records and destinations served. RDU is also planning on expanding their customs and border protection center to accommodate the increase in international flights at RDU.

== Facilities ==
Runways at Raleigh–Durham International Airport
| W | Length | Width | E |
|---|---|---|---|
| 05L → | 10,639 ft 3,243 m | 150 ft 46 m | ← 23R |
| 05L → | 10,000 ft 3,000 m | 150 ft 46 m | ← 23R |
Terminal area
| 05R → | 7,500 ft 2,300 m | 150 ft 46 m | ← 23L |
| 14 → | 3,570 ft 1,090 m | 100 ft 30 m | ← 32 |

=== Airfields ===
Runway 05L/23R is north of the airport terminals, while runways 05R/23L and 14/32 are south of the airport terminals. New runway 05L/23R is currently under construction northwest of the current runway 05L/23R.

=== Terminals ===
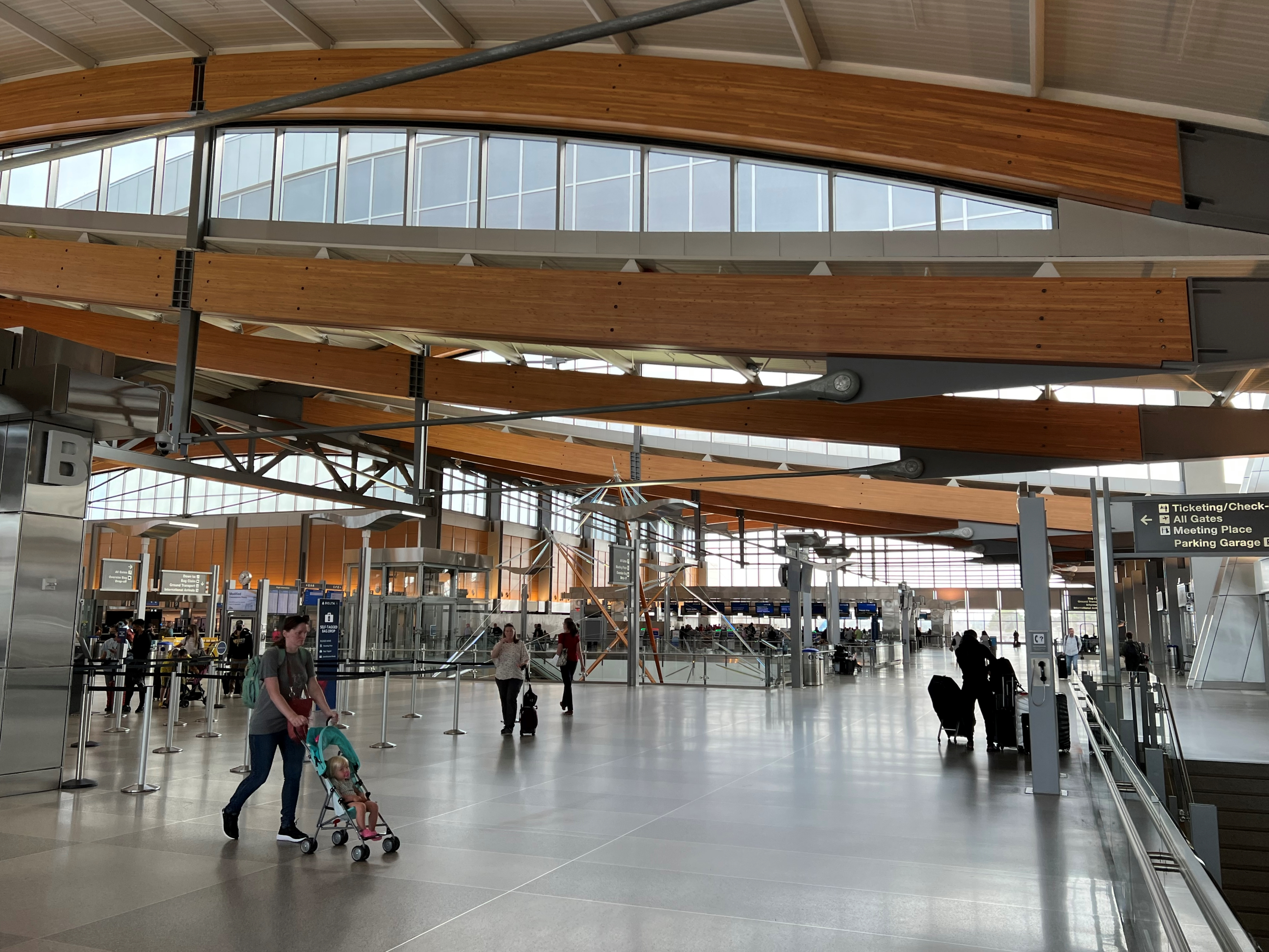
RDU Airport interior

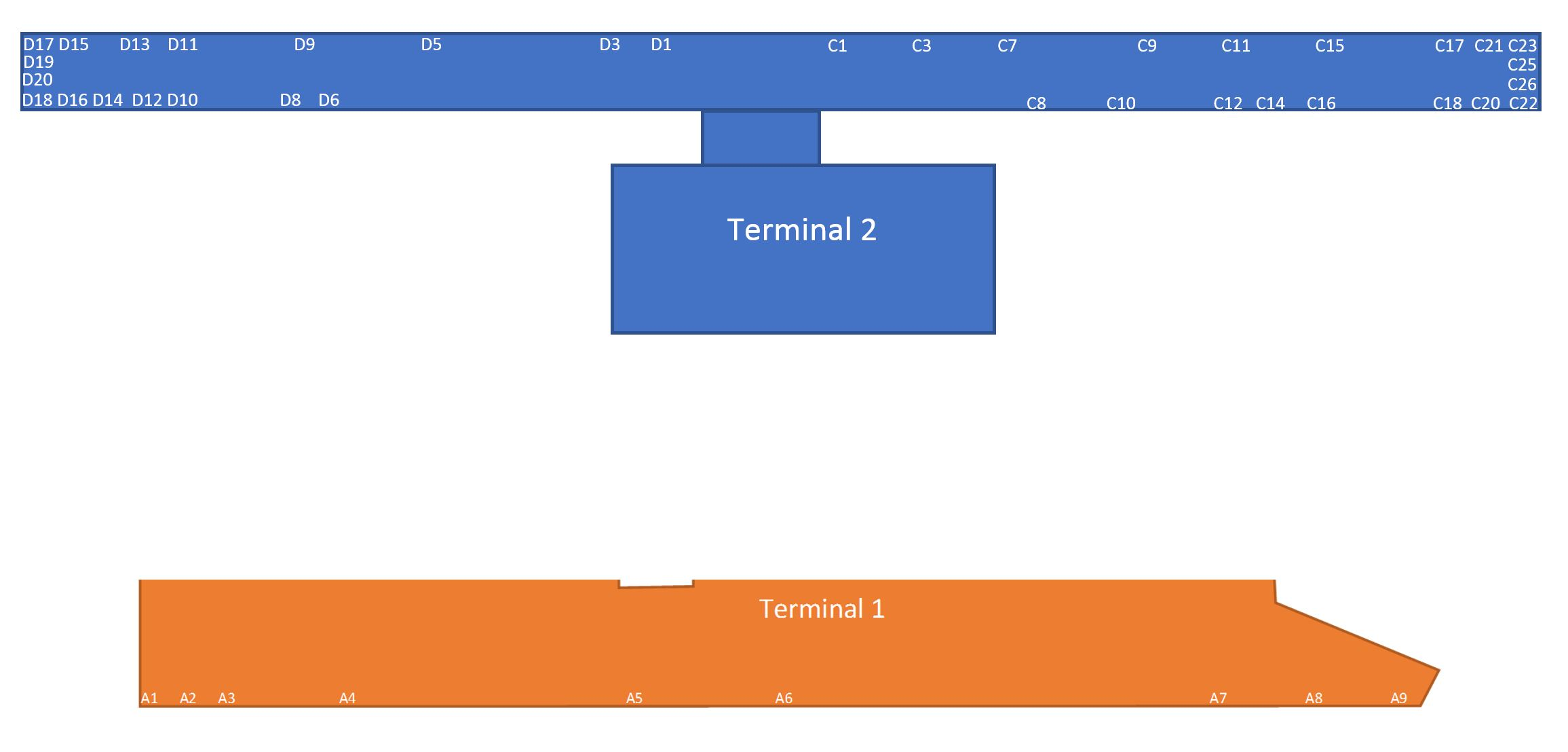
Terminals at RDU Airport

The airport contains two terminals with a total of 45 gates. The terminals do not have an airside connection; passengers moving between the terminals may ride a shuttle bus or take the moving walkway through covered parking decks between the terminals. All non precleared international flights are processed in Terminal 2 and arrive into gates C21, C23, C24 and C25.

- Terminal 1 contains 9 gates, A1–A9. The terminal is used by Alaska Airlines, Avelo Airlines, Breeze Airways, Southwest Airlines, and Sun Country Airlines. In 2024, RDU moved three airlines in Terminal 2 to maximize check-in, gate space, and overall terminal space for airlines at Terminal 2.
- Terminal 2 contains 36 gates, with concourses C and D. This is the only terminal at RDU that hosts international arrivals, utilizing gates C21 and C23–C25. Aer Lingus, Aeroméxico, Air Canada, Air France, American Airlines, BermudAir, Copa Airlines, Delta Air Lines, Frontier Airlines, Icelandair, JetBlue, Lufthansa, United, and Volaris fly from Terminal 2. American Airlines Admirals Club, Delta Air Lines Sky Club, United Club, and USO of North Carolina are all located in this terminal.

=== Cargo areas ===
The airport incorporates two cargo areas, North Cargo and South Cargo, with over 469,000 square feet of cargo space. The North Cargo terminal area is used by cargo airlines. The largest cargo operators are FedEx and UPS. The South Cargo terminal area is used by commercial airlines for cargo operations. Delta Cargo has capabilities for specialized pharmacy shipments.

=== Maintenance base ===
Endeavor Air built a maintenance base in 2019. No hangar is available for maintenance.

=== Military ===
The North Carolina Army National Guard utilize an adjacent area to headquarter the 449th Combat Aviation Brigade & 1st Battalion (Attack Reconnaissance), 130th Aviation Regiment. The unit houses AH-64 helicopters and utilize RDU airport.

== Airlines and destinations ==
=== Passenger ===
| Airlines | Destinations |
|---|---|
| Aer Lingus | Dublin |
| Aeroméxico | Seasonal: Cancún |
| Aeroméxico Connect | Mexico City–Benito Juárez |
| Air Canada | Seasonal: Toronto–Pearson |
| Air Canada Express | Montréal–Trudeau, Toronto–Pearson |
| Air France | Paris–Charles de Gaulle |
| Alaska Airlines | San Diego, Seattle/Tacoma |
| American Airlines | Charlotte, Chicago–O'Hare, Dallas/Fort Worth, London–Heathrow, Los Angeles, Miami, Philadelphia, Phoenix–Sky Harbor; Seasonal: Cancún, New York–LaGuardia, Punta Cana, Washington–National |
| American Eagle | Chicago–O'Hare, Nashville, New York–JFK, New York–LaGuardia, Philadelphia, Pittsburgh, Washington–National; Seasonal: Miami |
| Avelo Airlines | New Haven, Rochester (NY) |
| BermudAir | Seasonal: Belize City, Providenciales (both begin December 20, 2026) |
| Breeze Airways | Akron/Canton, Albany, Atlantic City, Birmingham (AL), Buffalo (begins June 29, 2027), Burlington (VT), Columbus–Glenn, Dayton, Daytona Beach, Fort Myers, Hartford, Jacksonville (FL), Key West, Las Vegas (resumes June 30, 2027), Long Island/Islip, Louisville, Manchester (NH), Memphis, Nassau (begins June 30, 2027), Newburgh, New Haven, New Orleans, Ogdensburg, Orlando, Pensacola, Pittsburgh, Portland (ME), Portsmouth, Providence, Provo, Punta Cana, Rochester (NY), San Antonio, Sarasota, Syracuse, Tallahassee, Tampa, Vero Beach, West Palm Beach, White Plains; Seasonal: Bangor, Madison, Orange County, San Diego |
| Copa Airlines | Panama City–Tocumen |
| Delta Air Lines | Atlanta, Boston, Detroit, Fort Lauderdale, Las Vegas, Los Angeles, Miami, Minneapolis/St. Paul, New York–LaGuardia, Orlando, Salt Lake City, Seattle/Tacoma, Tampa; Seasonal: Cancún, New York–JFK, San Juan |
| Delta Connection | Austin, Cincinnati, Fort Myers, Indianapolis, Kansas City, Nashville, New York–JFK, New York–LaGuardia, Newark, Orlando, Washington–National |
| Frontier Airlines | Atlanta, Boston, Cleveland, Dallas/Fort Worth, Denver, Detroit, Fort Lauderdale, Miami, Orlando, Philadelphia, San Juan, Tampa; Seasonal: Buffalo, Houston–Intercontinental |
| Icelandair | Reykjavík–Keflavík |
| JetBlue | Boston, Fort Lauderdale, New York–JFK, San Juan |
| Lufthansa | Frankfurt |
| Southwest Airlines | Austin, Baltimore, Chicago–Midway, Dallas–Love, Denver, Fort Lauderdale, Houston–Hobby, Kansas City, Las Vegas, Nashville, New Orleans, Orlando, Phoenix–Sky Harbor, St. Louis, Tampa |
| Sun Country Airlines | Seasonal: Minneapolis/St. Paul |
| United Airlines | Chicago–O'Hare, Denver, Houston–Intercontinental, Newark, San Francisco, Washington–Dulles |
| United Express | Houston–Intercontinental, Newark, Washington–Dulles; Seasonal: Chicago–O'Hare |
| Volaris | Guadalajara |

Destinations maps
Domestic destinations from RDU (excludes Northeast U.S., and U.S. territories). Red dots represent year-round destinations; green dots represent seasonal destinations; blue dots represent future destinations.
Northeast U.S. destinations from RDU. Red dots represent year-round destinations; green dots represent seasonal destinations; blue dots represent future destinations.
North and Central American destinations from RDU (excludes continental U.S.). Red dots represent year-round destinations; green dots represent seasonal destinations; blue dots represent future destinations.
European destinations from RDU. Red dots represent year-round destinations; green dots represent seasonal destinations; blue dots represent future destinations.

=== Cargo ===
| Airlines | Destinations | Refs |
|---|---|---|
| FedEx Express | Indianapolis, Memphis, Greensboro | |
| FedEx Feeder | New Bern, Jacksonville (NC), Wilmington (NC) | |
| UPS Airlines | Louisville, Manteo/Dare County, New Bern, Philadelphia, Wilmington (NC) | |
| Quest Diagnostics | Concord, Reading | |

== Statistics ==
=== Top destinations ===
Busiest domestic routes from RDU (September 2025 – August 2026)
| Rank | City | Passengers | Carriers |
|---|---|---|---|
| 1 | Atlanta, Georgia | 682,210 | Delta, Frontier, Southwest |
| 2 | Charlotte, North Carolina | 399,690 | American |
| 3 | Orlando, Florida | 394,410 | Breeze, Delta, Frontier, Southwest |
| 4 | Dallas/Fort Worth, Texas | 334,240 | American, Frontier, Spirit |
| 5 | Chicago–O'Hare, Illinois | 324,090 | American, Frontier, United |
| 6 | Boston, Massachusetts | 313,350 | Delta, Frontier, JetBlue |
| 7 | Miami, Florida | 300,360 | American, Delta, Frontier |
| 8 | New York–LaGuardia, New York | 283,370 | American, Delta, Frontier |
| 9 | Newark, New Jersey | 278,790 | Delta, Spirit, United |
| 10 | New York–JFK, New York | 263,240 | American, Delta, JetBlue |

Busiest international routes from RDU (September 2025 – August 2026)
| Rank | Airport | Passengers | % change from 2025 | Change in rank | Carriers |
|---|---|---|---|---|---|
| 1 | Paris–Charles de Gaulle, France | 72,655 | ▼2.33% | Steady | Air France |
| 2 | London–Heathrow, United Kingdom | 70,784 | ▼4.31% | Steady | American |
| 3 | Frankfurt, Germany | 53,465 | ▲17.81% | Steady | Lufthansa |
| 4 | Reykjavík–Keflavík, Iceland | 41,401 | ▲5.24% | Steady | Icelandair |
| 5 | Toronto–Pearson, Canada | 37,670 | ▼3.62% | Steady | Air Canada |
| 6 | Panama City–Tocumen, Panama | 30,322 | ▲10.54% | Steady | Copa Airlines |
| 7 | Mexico City–Benito Juárez, Mexico | 24,478 | ▼4.57% | Steady | Aeroméxico |
| 8 | Montréal–Trudeau, Canada | 22,166 | ▲86.98% | Steady | Air Canada |
| 9 | Cancún, Mexico | 13,920 | ▲138.64% | Steady | Aeroméxico, American, Delta, Frontier, JetBlue |
| 10 | Dublin, Ireland | 13,455 | ▲100.00% | Steady | Aer Lingus |
| 11 | Punta Cana, Dominican Republic | 8,633 | ▲59.02% | Steady | American, Avelo, Breeze |
| 12 | Vancouver, Canada | 4,853 | ▲23.42% | Steady | Air Canada |
| 13 | Calgary, Canada | 1,399 | ▼68.97% | Steady | WestJet |
| 14 | Hamilton, Bermuda | 784 | ▲100.00% | ▲1 | BermudAir |
| 15 | Montego Bay, Jamaica | 554 | ▼88.13% | ▼1 | Avelo |

=== Annual traffic ===
Annual passengers at RDU, enplaned and deplaned, 1985–present
| Year | Passengers | Year | Passengers | Year | Passengers |
|---|---|---|---|---|---|
| 1985 | 2,771,009 | 2005 | 9,303,904 | 2025 | 15,644,658 |
| 1986 | 3,100,002 | 2006 | 9,432,925 | 2026 | 10,358,104 (Note: As of September 2026.) |
| 1987 | 4,854,073 | 2007 | 10,037,424 | 2027 | |
| 1988 | 7,352,007 | 2008 | 9,715,928 | 2028 | |
| 1989 | 8,594,671 | 2009 | 8,973,398 | 2029 | |
| 1990 | 9,265,665 | 2010 | 9,101,920 | 2030 | |
| 1991 | 9,381,586 | 2011 | 9,161,279 | 2031 | |
| 1992 | 9,925,364 | 2012 | 9,220,391 | 2032 | |
| 1993 | 9,695,886 | 2013 | 9,186,748 | 2033 | |
| 1994 | 8,999,491 | 2014 | 9,545,360 | 2034 | |
| 1995 | 5,937,135 | 2015 | 10,015,244 | 2035 | |
| 1996 | 6,417,871 | 2016 | 11,049,143 | 2036 | |
| 1997 | 6,724,874 | 2017 | 11,653,693 | 2027 | |
| 1998 | 7,228,653 | 2018 | 12,801,697 | 2038 | |
| 1999 | 8,941,775 | 2019 | 14,218,621 | 2039 | |
| 2000 | 10,438,585 | 2020 | 4,883,913 | 2040 | |
| 2001 | 9,584,087 | 2021 | 8,795,128 | 2041 | |
| 2002 | 8,241,253 | 2022 | 11,842,330 | 2042 | |
| 2003 | 7,912,547 | 2023 | 14,523,996 | 2043 | |
| 2004 | 8,637,606 | 2024 | 15,475,466 | 2044 | |

=== Airline market share ===
Carrier shares (September 2025 - August 2026)
1. Delta, 3,016,000 (20.6%)
2. American, 2,467,000 (16.8%)
3. Southwest, 2,030,000 (13.8%)
4. United, 1,545,000 (10.5%)
5. Frontier, 1,280,000 (8.72%)
6. Other, 4,341,000 (29.6%)

Largest airlines at RDU (September 2025 - August 2026)
| Rank | Airline | Passengers | Share |
|---|---|---|---|
| 1 | Delta Air Lines | 3,016,000 | 20.55% |
| 2 | American Airlines | 2,467,000 | 16.81% |
| 3 | Southwest Airlines | 2,030,000 | 13.83% |
| 4 | United Airlines | 1,545,000 | 10.53% |
| 5 | Frontier Airlines | 1,280,000 | 8.72% |
| | Other (Note: Includes flights operated by American Eagle, Delta Connection, and United Express partner airlines. The specific airline total passenger numbers only include mainline operations.) | 4,341,000 | 29.58% |

== Accidents and incidents ==
- On January 2, 1953, a USAF Douglas C-47 crashed near RDU attempting to land with rain and low visibility after diverting from Pope AFB in Fayetteville. The aircraft crashed nearly two miles south of the airport in Lake Crabtree County Park. Three out of the four occupants died.
- On December 4, 1971, an Eastern Air Lines DC-9-31, operating as flight 898, collided with a Cessna U206 while on final approach to runway 5 (now runway 5 right). Both aircraft were following instructions from air traffic controllers at the airport. As the DC-9 was on final and cleared to continue its approach, they reported to the tower that they had descended on top of another aircraft. Following the collision, the Cessna became stuck to the landing gear of the DC-9, falling off several miles later and crashing within the airport property. Both the pilot and single passenger of the Cessna were killed upon impact. The DC-9 landed safely about an hour later with no injuries to the 27 people on board, and suffered only minor damage to the landing gear. Following the crash, the NTSB determined that the probable cause of the crash was failures by the air traffic controllers at RDU, combined with the inability of the two crews to see the other aircraft.
- On Wednesday, November 12, 1975, Eastern Air Lines Flight 576, a Boeing 727-225, crashed while attempting to land on runway 23 (now runway 23 Left). The aircraft hit the ground 282 feet (86 m) short of the runway and bounced back into the air before coming down on the runway and sliding 4,150 feet (1,260 m) down the runway, stopping where the south end of Terminal 1 is today. Of the 139 persons on the flight, eight were injured, one seriously. The NTSB investigation initially blamed the crash on "the pilot's failure to execute a missed approach when he lost sight of the runway environment in heavy rain below decision height." The accident report and probable cause were later revised to include the influence of undetected wind shear. The aircraft (Boeing 727-225, N8838E) sustained major damage and was moved to an area on the north end of closed runway 18.
- On February 19, 1988, AVAir Flight 3378, a Fairchild Swearingen Metroliner was on a regularly scheduled flight between Raleigh and Richmond operating for American Eagle when it crashed into a reservoir about a mile from the airport in the vicinity of Cary. The aircraft had departed during low ceiling, low visibility and night conditions. Analysis of radar data indicated the aircraft was in a 45-degree descending turn. Both crew members and all 10 passengers were killed. It was revealed during the investigation that the pilot had complained of illness but decided to continue the flight.
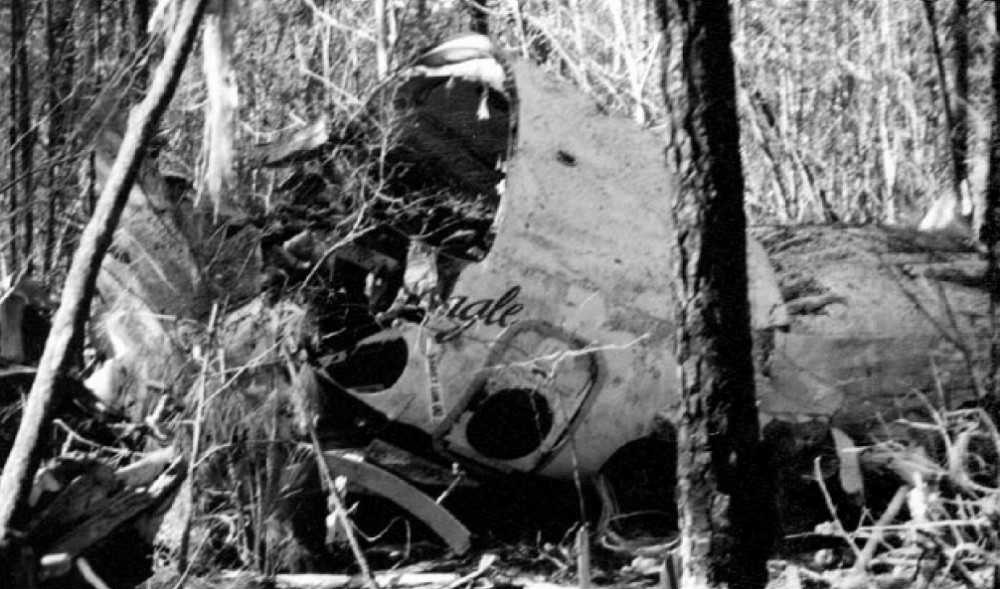
  Wreckage of Flagship Airlines Flight 3379
- On December 13, 1994, Flagship Airlines Flight 3379 operated by AMR's regional airline Flagship Airlines, a Jetstream 31 was on a regularly scheduled service of Raleigh–Greensboro–Raleigh when it crashed into a wooded area about 4 miles (6.4 km) SW of the airport, in the vicinity of Morrisville. Of the 20 onboard (18 passengers and two crewmembers) 15 were killed while the five survivors received serious injuries. The probable cause of the crash was the pilot not following proper procedure when it came to an engine failure situation.
- On July 31, 2000, a Win Win Aviation de Havilland Canada DHC-6 Twin Otter crashed on approach nearly two miles SSW of RDU on a positioning flight due to fog and darkness. The pilot was not instrument rated to fly in bad weather. One crewmember out of the three occupants died.
- On October 20, 2019, a Piper PA-32 crashed in a wooded area of Umstead State Park on approach to runway 32. Both occupants of the plane died.
- On July 29, 2022, a CASA C-212 Aviocar from Raeford West Airport made an emergency landing and subsequently slid off runway 23L due to its lack of right landing gear. On approach, the 23-year old co-pilot, Charles Hew Crooks, exited the plane over Fuquay-Varina and subsequently died. The pilot was transported to the hospital with minor injuries as the result of a rough landing.
- On April 25, 2024, a Socata TBM 850 from Wilmington operated by UNC Air Operations crashed during landing on runway 32. Both the pilot and the sole onboard passenger were injured.

== See also ==
- List of airports in North Carolina
- List of the busiest airports in the United States
- North Carolina World War II Army Airfields
