= 13th Field Artillery Regiment =

US military unit

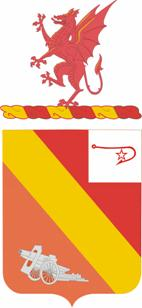
- Coat of arms
- Active: 1916
- Country: United States
- Branch: Army
- Type: Field artillery
- Motto(s): Without Fear, Favor or the Hope of Reward

Insignia
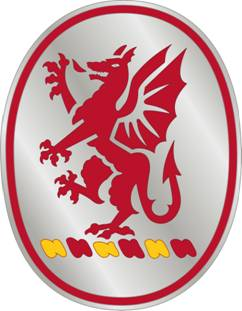
- Distinctive unit insignia

The 13th Field Artillery Regiment is a field artillery regiment of the United States Army first formed in 1916.

== History ==
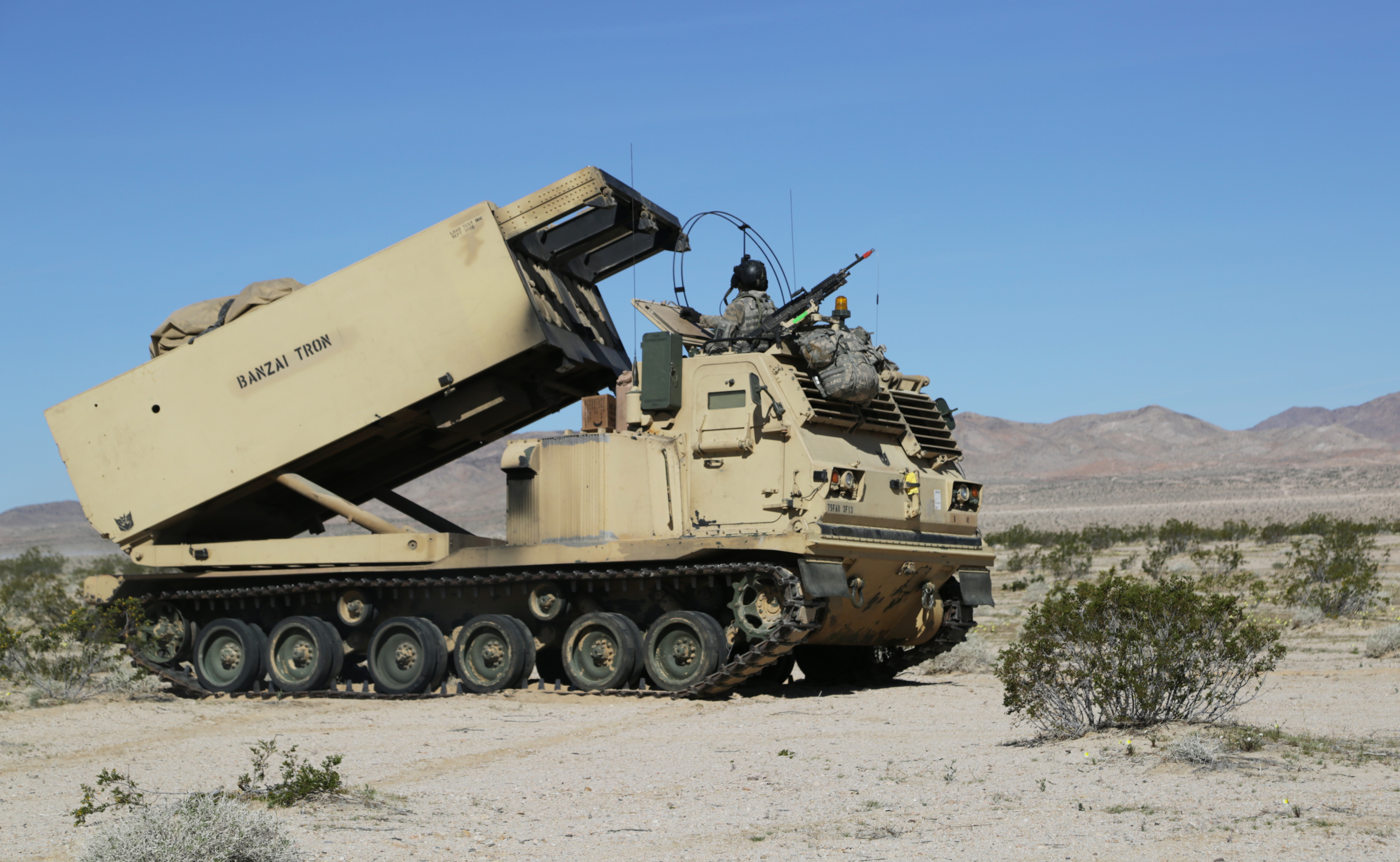
Soldiers from the 3rd Battalion, 13th Field Artillery Regiment, attached to the 2nd Brigade Combat Team, 1st Infantry Division, conduct a dry-fire exercise of the M270A1 Multiple Launch Rocket System during Decisive Action Rotation 15–06 at the National Training Center, Fort Irwin, Calif., 25 March 2015.

The 13th Field Artillery was constituted 1 July 1916 in the Regular Army at Camp Stewart, Texas.

== Lineage ==
Constituted 1 July 1916 in the Regular Army the 13th Field Artillery

Organized 1 June 1917 at Camp Stewart, Texas

Assigned 10 December 1917 to the 4th Division

Relieved 4 October 1920 from assignment to the 4th Division

Assigned 1 March 1921 to the Hawaiian Division (later redesignated as the 24th Infantry Division)

Reorganized and redesignated 1 October 1941 as the 13th Field Artillery Battalion

Relieved 31 March 1958 from assignment to the 24th Infantry Division; concurrently reorganized and redesignated as the 13th Artillery, a parent regiment under the Combat Arms Regimental System

Vietnam 1965-1975-

2nd 13th Artillery Battalion was organized in 1965 at Fort Sill OK and deployed to Vietnam under the II Field Force 23rd Artillery group.

3rd 13th Field Artillery Battalion was organized in 1966 and deployed to Vietnam as part of the 25th Infantry Division and in 1970 they were relieved of duty and returned to Schofield Barracks.

7th 13th Field Artillery Battalion was organized in 1966 at Fort Irwin, ca and assignment to the 1st Field Force the 41st and 52nd Artillery group, and attached to the 1st Air Cavalry and the 1/50th Mech Infantry.

From 1968 to 1969, A Battery, 2nd Battalion of the 13th F.A.R. combined briefly with B Battery, 3rd Battalion of the 197th F.A.R. of the New Hampshire National Guard, to form D Battery, 2nd Battalion of the 13th F.A.R., also known as the "Jungle Battery".

They were Deactivated in 1970.

Redesignated 1 September 1971 as the 13th Field Artillery

Withdrawn 16 March 1987 from the Combat Arms Regimental System and reorganized under the United States Army Regimental System

== Distinctive unit insignia ==
- Description

A Silver color metal and enamel device 1 1/16 inches (2.7 cm) in height consisting of an oval Argent within a diminished bordure Gules the crest of the regiment (on a wreath of the colors Or and Gules a dragon rampant of the last).

- Symbolism

The dragon commemorates a march from Esnes to Malincourt during the night of 26–27 September 1918, over very difficult terrain and against resistance. The dragon, a mythical animal, typifies the inferno prevailing that night.

- Background

The distinctive unit insignia was originally approved for the 13th Field Artillery Regiment on 15 January 1923. It was amended to revise the description on 14 February 1927. The insignia was redesignated for the 13th Field Artillery Battalion on 7 May 1942. It was redesignated for the 13th Artillery Regiment on 16 October 1958. The insignia was redesignated for the 13th Field Artillery Regiment on 1 September 1971.

== Coat of arms ==
- Blazon
- Shield

Per bend Gules and Tenné a band Or, on a sinister canton Argent a mullet of the like fimbriated of the first within a fishhook fesswise ring to dexter, barb to base of the first (for the 5th Field Artillery), a broken howitzer Proper.

- Crest

On a wreath of the colors Or and Gules, a dragon rampant of the last.

- Symbolism
- Shield

Scarlet and yellow are the colors used for Field Artillery. The canton with mullet and fishhook refers to the 5th Field Artillery from which the 13th Field Artillery was organized in June 1917. The bend is taken from the arms of Lorraine, where the heaviest fighting of the regiment occurred. The broken howitzer alludes to the Vesle River, where heavy losses were sustained and the two pieces put out of action by direct hits.

- Crest

The dragon commemorates a march from Esnes to Malincourt during the night of 26–27 September 1918, over very difficult terrain and against resistance. The dragon, a mythical animal, typifies the inferno prevailing that night.

- Background

The coat of arms was originally approved for the 13th Field Artillery Regiment on 29 September 1920. It was amended to revise the blazon of the shield on 1 February 1922. The insignia was redesignated for the 13th Field Artillery Battalion on 7 May 1942. It was redesignated for the 13th Artillery Regiment on 16 October 1958. The insignia was redesignated for the 13th Field Artillery Regiment on 1 September 1971. The coat of arms was amended to correct the motto on 2 February 1978.

== Current configuration ==
- 1st Battalion 13th Field Artillery Regiment (United States)
- 2nd Battalion 13th Field Artillery Regiment
- 3rd Battalion 13th Field Artillery Regiment
- 4th Battalion 13th Field Artillery Regiment
- 5th Battalion 13th Field Artillery Regiment
- 7th Battalion 13th field Artillery Battalion 1966-70

== Campaign participation credit ==
World War I: Aisne-Marne; St. Mihiel; Meuse-Argonne; Champagne 1918; Lorraine 1918

World War II: Central Pacific; New Guinea (with arrowhead); Leyte (with arrowhead); Luzon (with arrowhead); Southern Philippines (with arrowhead)

Korean War: UN Defensive; UN Offensive; CCF Intervention; First UN Counteroffensive; CCF Spring Offensive; UN Summer-Fall Offensive; Second Korean Winter; Korea, Summer 1953

Vietnam: Defense; Counteroffensive; Counteroffensive, Phase II; Counteroffensive, Phase III; Tet Counteroffensive; Counteroffensive, Phase IV; Counteroffensive, Phase V; Counteroffensive, Phase VI; Tet 69/Counteroffensive; Summer-Fall 1969; Winter-Spring 1970; Sanctuary Counteroffensive; Counteroffensive, Phase VII

Vietnam; 7th Bn 13th Arty Battalion

Vietnam Counter Offensive, Phase II - 1 July 1966 to 31 May 1967

Vietnam Counter Offensive, Phase III - 1 June 1967 to 29 June 1968

Tet Counter Offensive - 30 January 1968 to 1 April 1968

Vietnam Counter Offensive, Phase IV - 2 April 1968 to 30 June 1968

Vietnam Counter Offensive, Phase V - 1 July 1968 to 1 November 1968

Vietnam Counter Offensive, Phase VI - 2 November 1968 to 22 February 1969

Tet 69 Counter Offensive - 23 February 1969 to 8 June 1969

Vietnam Summer-Fall 1969 - 9 June 1969 to 31 October 1969

Vietnam Winter-Spring 1970 - 1 November 1969 to 30 April 1970

Sanctuary Counter Offensive - 1 May 1970 to 30 June 1970

Vietnam Counter Offensive, Phase VII - 1 July 1970 to 30

Southwest Asia: Defense of Saudi Arabia; Liberation and Defense of Kuwait; Cease-Fire

== Decorations ==
Presidential Unit Citation (Army) for DEFENSE OF KOREA

Meritorious Unit Commendation (Army) for VIETNAM 1965-1966

Meritorious Unit Commendation (Army) for VIETNAM 1966-1968

Meritorious Unit Commendation (Army) for VIETNAM 1967-1968

Meritorious Unit Commendation (Army) for VIETNAM 1968-1969

Philippine Presidential Unit Citation for 17 OCTOBER 1944 TO 4 JULY 1945

Republic of Korea Presidential Unit Citation for PYONGTAEK

Republic of Korea Presidential Unit Citation for KOREA 1952-1953

RVN Gallantry Cross Unit Citation awarded Dec. 1974

== Notable members ==
- Calvin Simon, served with C Battery, 3rd Battalion during the Vietnam War.

== See also ==
- Field Artillery Branch (United States)
