= Raleigh Municipal Airport =

Former airport of Raleigh, North Carolina, United States (1929–1973)

Raleigh Municipal AIrport
- IATA: none; ICAO: none

Summary
- Airport type: Defunct
- Serves: The Research Triangle Metropolitan Region of North Carolina
- Location: Raleigh, North Carolina
- Opened: September 1929
- Closed: 1973
- Passenger services ceased: May 1, 1943
- Time zone: America/Eastern (-5)
- Coordinates: 35.73°N 78.66°W

Map

Raleigh Municipal Airport was an airfield south of Raleigh, North Carolina which operated from 1929 through its closing in 1973. It was originally established by the Curtiss Wright Flying Service as Curtis Field and later leased to the city, constructed by the Works Progress Administration.

The airport consisted of 5 runways, the longest 3,200 feet (980 m), and a hangar with "Raleigh" painted in large letters on the roof.

Amelia Earhart visited in 1931 to christen a new aircraft for Curtiss Wright.

In 1932, Eastern Air Transport which later became Eastern Air Lines, began mail and passenger service between New York and Miami. In 1933 Curtiss Wright Flying Service went bankrupt and the city leased the property hiring Serv-Air to service the airport and operate a flying school in a rededication ceremony on October 4, 1934. By 1934 the airport had 3 runways made of clay, sand and grass, the longest was 3,475 feet (1,059 m). The airport also maintained a weather bureau station.

Surrounded by highways, a railroad and a cemetery, the airport was unable to expand to meet increasing demands for air travel, especially those from the military as World War II loomed. The airport was used for army training in 1940 and an anti-aircraft battery was installed. "The ladies of the neighborhood lavished the soldiers with pies and cakes." according to a 12-year-old boy at the time. In 1943, commercial flights were moved to the newly Army-constructed Raleigh–Durham International Airport 12 miles to the northwest and the airport continued to serve general aviation. The airport site sat largely abandoned until 2006, when it was redeveloped as commercial and residential property.
