= 449th Combat Aviation Brigade =

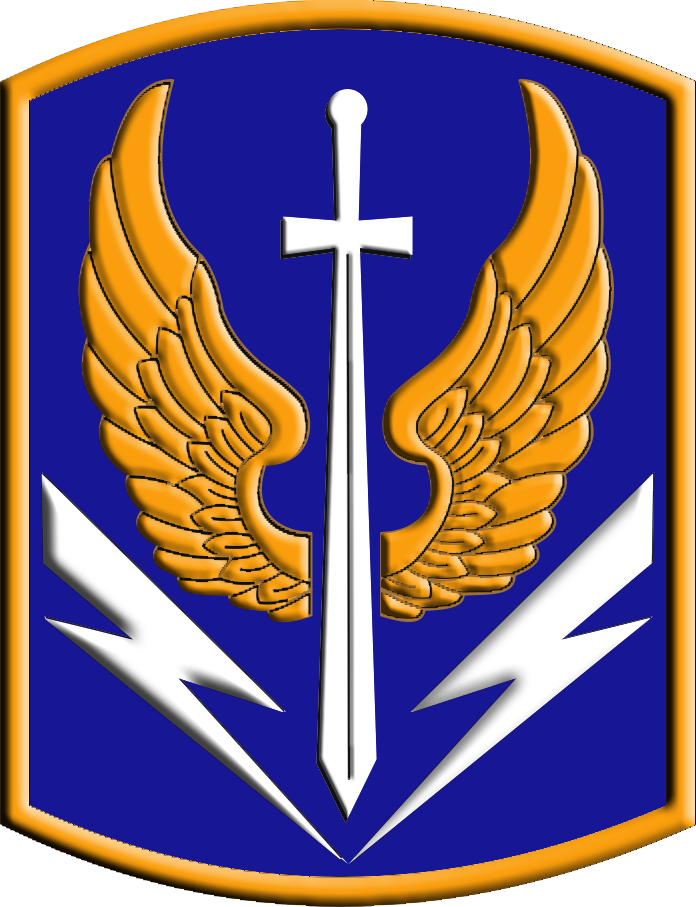
- Active: 1 October 1987 - present
- Country: United States
- Branch: United States Army National Guard
- Type: Brigade
- Role: Combat Aviation
- Part of: North Carolina Army National Guard
- Website: https://ng.nc.gov/449th-combat-aviation-brigade

Commanders
- Current commander: Col. Benny Collins

Insignia
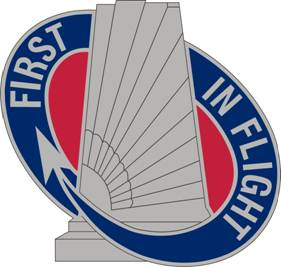
- 449th Aviation Brigade DUI

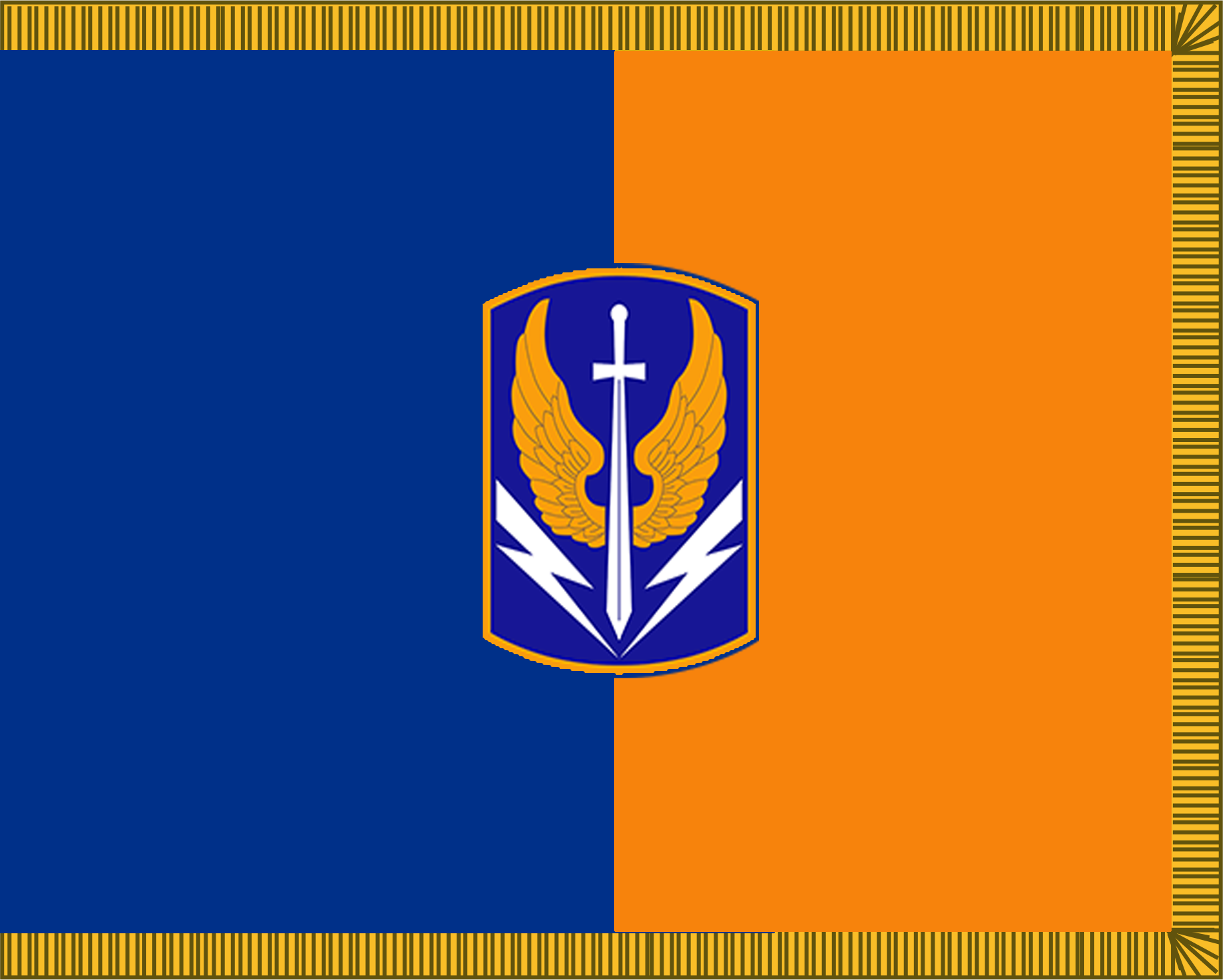
- 449th Aviation Brigade Flag

The 449th Combat Aviation Brigade is a Combat Aviation Brigade of the North Carolina Army National Guard based in North Carolina.

The unit was formed on 1 October 1987 in the North Carolina Army National Guard as Headquarters and Headquarters Company, 449th Aviation Group.

It was organized and Federally recognized 12 September 1987 at Kinston

It was reorganized and redesignated 1 September 2006 as Headquarters and Headquarters Company, 449th Aviation Brigade

== History ==
The unit deployed to Camp Taji during September 2017 as part of Operation Inherent Resolve and Operation Spartan Shield and included the following units:

- 1st Battalion (Assault), 244th Aviation Regiment
- 248th Aviation Support Battalion
- 17th Cavalry Regiment
  - 2nd Squadron
  - 7th Squadron
- 4th Battalion (Attack Reconnaissance), 4th Aviation Regiment
- 229th Aviation Regiment
  - B Company
- 227th Aviation Regiment
  - F Company
- 1st Battalion (General Support), 126th Aviation Regiment
  - Elements of 2nd Battalion (Airfield Operations), 130th Aviation Regiment
  - Elements of 1st Battalion (General Support), 189th Aviation Regiment

== Structure ==
Units:

- Headquarters and Headquarters Company
  - 1st Battalion (General Support) 126th Aviation Regiment
    - Company B
      - Detachment 2
    - Company C
      - Detachment 2
  - 1st Battalion (Attack Reconnaissance), 130th Aviation Regiment
  - 2nd Battalion (Airfield Operations), 130th Aviation Regiment
  - 1st Battalion (Assault Helicopter), 131st Aviation Regiment
    - Company C
  - Detachment 17 (Joint Operational Support Airlift Center)
  - 2nd Battalion, 151st Aviation Regiment
    - Company B
      - Detachment 1
  - 638th Aviation Support Battalion
    - Company B
      - Detachment 1
  - 677th Engineer Detachment (Firefighting Tactial Group (FFTG))
  - 430th Engineer Detachment (FFTG)
