= 197th Division =

197th Division may refer to:

- 197th Division (People's Republic of China)
- 197th Infantry Division (German Empire)
- 197th Infantry Division (Wehrmacht)
- 197th Motor Rifle Division, Soviet Union
- 197th Rifle Division, Soviet Union

== See also ==
- List of military divisions by number
- 197th Brigade (disambiguation)
- 197th Regiment (disambiguation)
- 197th (disambiguation)
