= 130th Aviation Regiment =

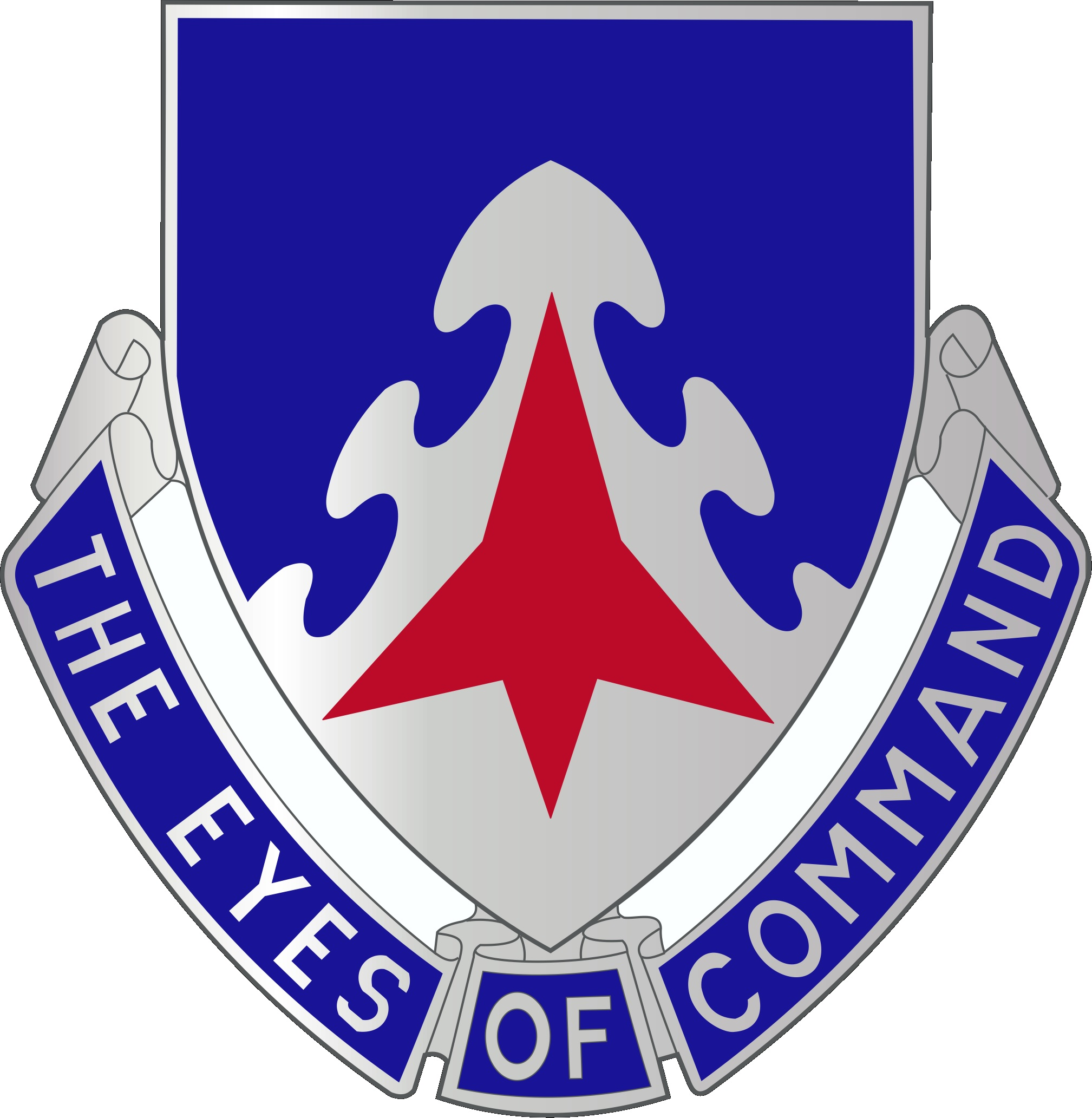
- coat of arms
- Country: United States
- Allegiance: North Carolina
- Branch: United States Army
- Type: Aviation
- Part of: North Carolina Army National Guard/United States Army Aviation Branch
- Garrison/HQ: Raleigh–Durham International Airport

Aircraft flown
- Attack helicopter: AH-64E

The 130th Aviation Regiment is an aviation regiment of the U.S. Army, and part of the North Carolina Army National Guard.

== Structure ==
- 1st Battalion (Attack Reconnaissance) "Panthers" (NC ARNG)
  - Afghanistan 2018 - March 2019
  - Company C (AH-64D) (NC ARNG)
    - Afghanistan - August 2003 - June 2004 / HQ at Kandahar.
- 2nd Battalion (Airfield Operations) (NC ARNG)
