= 197th Field Artillery Brigade =

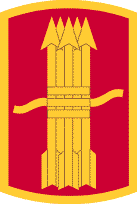
- 197th Field Artillery Brigade shoulder sleeve insignia
- Active: 1861
- Country: United States
- Branch: United States Army National Guard
- Type: Artillery
- Size: Brigade
- Part of: New Hampshire Army National Guard
- Garrison/HQ: Manchester, New Hampshire
- Nickname: Concord Volunteers (Special Designation)

Commanders
- Current commander: Colonel Jeffrey M. Samon
- Notable commanders: Thomas F. Spencer

Insignia
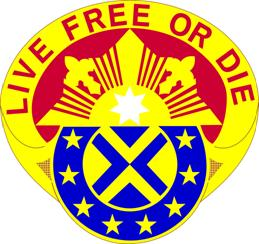
- Distinctive Unit Insignia

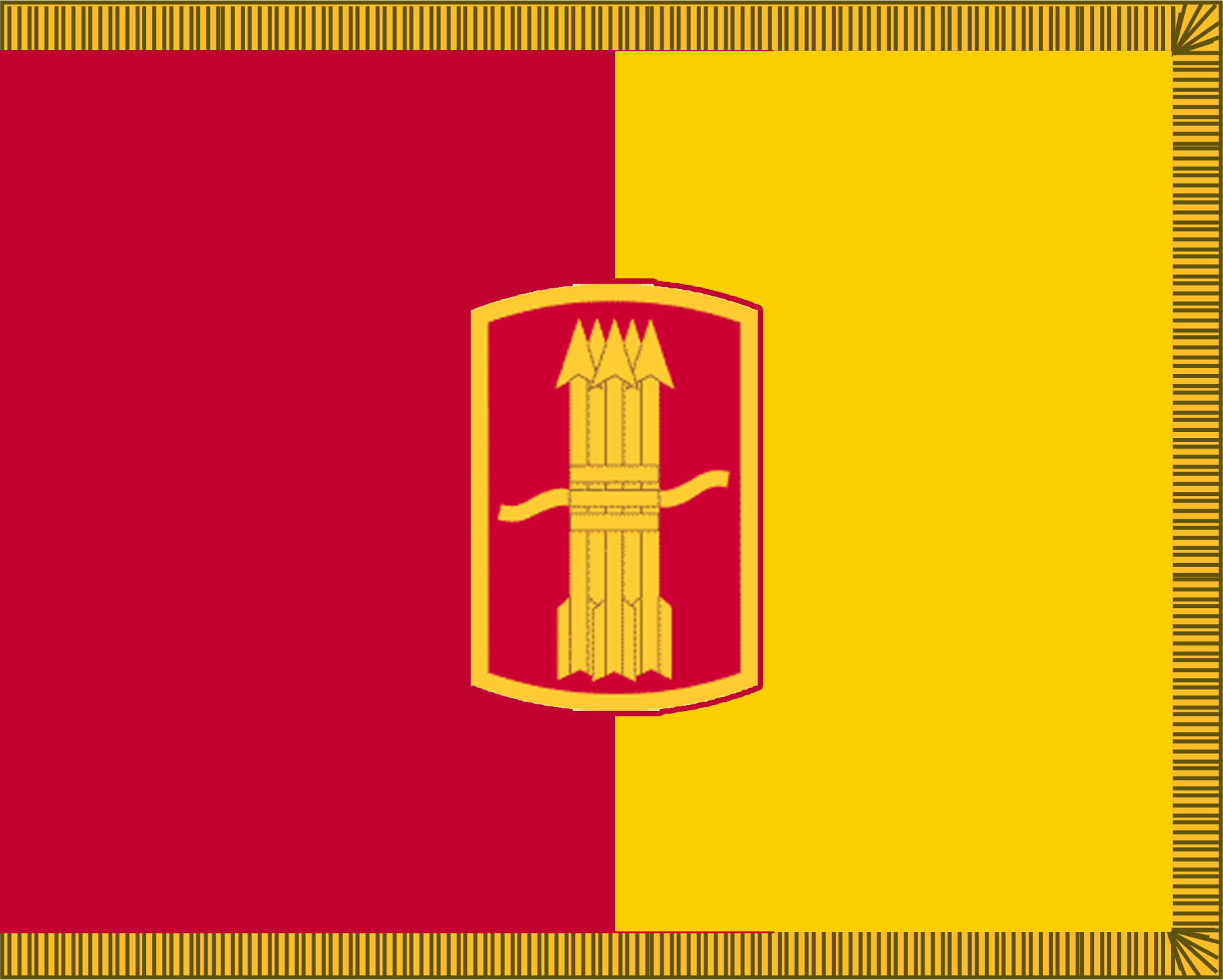
- 197th Field Artillery Brigade Flag

The 197th Field Artillery Brigade ("Concord Volunteers") is a field artillery brigade of the New Hampshire Army National Guard.

== Organization ==
- 197th Field Artillery Brigade, in Manchester (NH) — (NHARNG)
  - Headquarters and Headquarters Battery, in Manchester (NH)
  - 603rd Public Affairs Detachment, in Concord (NH)
  - 1st Battalion, 103rd Field Artillery Regiment, in Providence (RI) (M777A2) — (RIARNG)
    - Headquarters and Headquarters Battery, in Providence (RI)
    - Battery A, in Providence (RI)
    - Battery B, in North Smithfield (RI)
    - Battery C, in Lebanon (NH) — (NHARNG)
    - 1207th Forward Support Company, in East Greenwich (RI)
      - Detachment 1, in Lebanon (NH) — (NHARNG)
  - 1st Battalion, 182nd Field Artillery Regiment, in Detroit (MI) (M142 HIMARS) — (MIARNG)
    - Headquarters and Headquarters Battery, in Detroit (MI)
    - Battery A, in Detroit (MI)
    - Battery B, in Bay City (MI)
    - 182nd Forward Support Company, in Detroit (MI)
  - 3rd Battalion, 197th Field Artillery Regiment, in Plymouth (NH) (M142 HIMARS) — (NHARNG)
    - Headquarters and Headquarters Battery, in Plymouth (NH)
      - Detachment 1, Headquarters and Headquarters Battery, in Franklin (NH)
    - Battery A, in Littleton (NH)
    - Battery B, in Nashua (NH)
    - 744th Forward Support Company, in Hillsborough (NH)
  - 1st Battalion, 201st Field Artillery Regiment, in Fairmont (WV) (M109A6 Paladin) — (WVARNG)
    - Headquarters and Headquarters Battery, in Fairmont (WV)
    - Battery A, in Elkins (WV)
    - Battery B, in Morgantown (WV)
    - Battery C, in Lewisburg (WV)
    - 1201st Forward Support Company, in Kingwood (WV)
  - 3643rd Brigade Support Battalion, in Portsmouth (NH) — (NHARNG)
    - Headquarters Support Company, in Portsmouth (NH)
      - Detachment 1, Headquarters Support Company, in Manchester (NH)
    - 372nd Signal Company, in Manchester (NH)

== Lineage ==
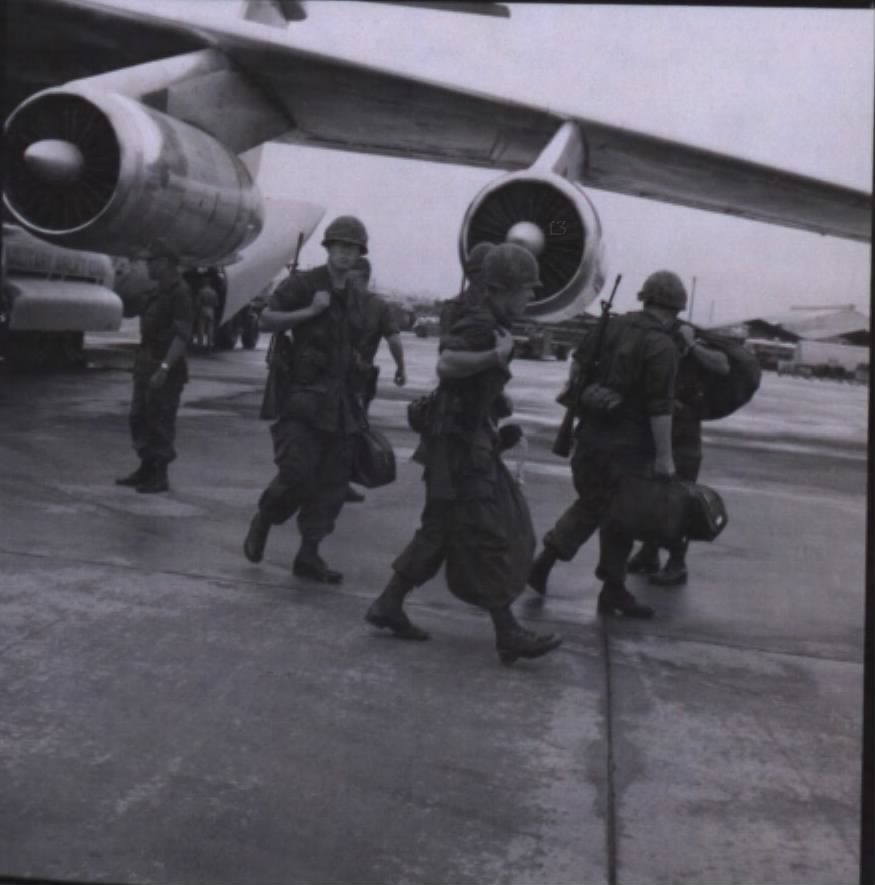
Men of the 3rd Battalion, 197th Artillery arrive at Bien Hoa Air Base, South Vietnam, 18 September 1968

Organized in 1861 at Concord as the Concord Volunteers. Mustered into federal service 3 June 1861 at Portsmouth as Company E, 2d New Hampshire Volunteer Infantry; mustered out of federal service 19 December 1865 at Cabin Point, Virginia. Reorganized 31 October 1865 in the New Hampshire Volunteer Militia at Concord as the State Capitol Guards. Redesignated 24 September 1866 as Company F (State Capitol Guards), 1st Regiment. Disbanded in 1869 at Concord.

Reorganized 15 March 1877 in the New Hampshire Volunteer Militia at Concord as Company K (State Capitol Guards), 2d Regiment. Redesignated 18 April 1878 as Company C (State Capitol Guards), 3d Regiment (New Hampshire Volunteer Militia redesignated 1 April 1879 as the New Hampshire National Guard). Mustered into federal service 8 May 1898 at Concord as Company C, 1st New Hampshire Volunteer Infantry; mustered out of federal service 31 October 1898 at Concord and reorganized as Company C, 3d Regiment. Redesignated 23 January 1900 as Company C, 2d Regiment. Redesignated 15 April 1909 as Company C, 1st Infantry. Mustered into federal service 30 June 1916 at Concord; mustered out of federal service 20 February 1917 at Concord. Mustered into federal service 25 July 1917 at Concord; drafted into federal service 5 August 1917. Reorganized and redesignated 11 February 1918 as Company C, First Army Headquarters Regiment. Demobilized 26 January 1919 at Camp Dix, New Jersey.

Reorganized and federally recognized 24 April 1922 in the New Hampshire National Guard at Concord as Headquarters Battery, 197th Artillery (Coast Artillery Corps). Redesignated 23 April 1924 as Headquarters Battery, 197th Coast Artillery (United States). Inducted into federal service 16 September 1940 at Concord. Reorganized and redesignated 15 May 1943 as Headquarters and Headquarters Battery, 197th Antiaircraft Artillery Group. Inactivated 28 December 1945 at Camp Stoneman, California.

Reorganized and federally recognized 15 April 1947 at Concord. Ordered into active federal service 14 August 1950 at Concord; released 13 August 1952 from active federal service and reverted to state control. Consolidated 1 February 1959 with Battery A, 744th Antiaircraft Artillery Battalion see ANNEX 1), and consolidated unit reorganized and redesignated as Headquarters and Headquarters Battery, 197th Artillery Group.

Consolidated 1 December 1967 with Headquarters and Headquarters Battery, II Corps Artillery (see ANNEX 2), and consolidated unit designated as Headquarters and Headquarters Battery, 197th Artillery Group; location concurrently changed to Manchester. Redesignated 1 November 1971 as Headquarters and Headquarters Battery, 197th Field Artillery Group. Redesignated 1 September 1978 as Headquarters and Headquarters Battery, 197th Field Artillery Brigade. Consolidated 30 June 1993 with Battery A, 197th Field Artillery (see ANNEX 3), and consolidated unit designated as Headquarters and Headquarters Battery, 197th Field Artillery Brigade.

Ordered into active Federal service 3 January 2004 at Manchester; released from active Federal service 30 June 2005 and reverted to state control. Reorganized and redesignated 1 September 2008 as Headquarters and Headquarters Battery, 197th Fires Brigade. Ordered into active Federal service 11 September 2010 at Manchester; released from active Federal service 15 October 2011 and reverted to state control.

=== ANNEX 1 ===
Organized 1 March 1877 in the New Hampshire Volunteer Militia at Concord as Company E (Pillsbury Light Guard), 2d Regiment. Redesignated 18 April 1878 as Company E (Pillsbury Light Guard), 3d Regiment. (New Hampshire Volunteer Militia redesignated 1 April 1879 as the New Hampshire National Guard). Disbanded 3 April 1885 at Concord.

Reorganized 14 April 1891 in the New Hampshire National Guard at Concord as Company E, 3d Regiment. Mustered into federal service 9 May 1898 at Concord as Company E, 1st New Hampshire Volunteer Infantry; mustered out of federal service 31 October 1898 at Concord and reorganized as Company E, 3d Regiment. Redesignated 23 January 1900 as Company E, 2d Regiment. Redesignated 15 April 1909 as Company E, 1st Infantry. Mustered into federal service 20 June 1916 at Concord; mustered out of federal service 20 February 1917 at Concord. Mustered into federal service 25 July 1917 at Concord; drafted into federal service 5 August 1917. Reorganized and redesignated 11 February 1918 as Company E, First Army Headquarters Regiment. Demobilized 26 January 1919 at Camp Dix, New Jersey.

Reorganized and federally recognized 22 December 1921 in the New Hampshire National Guard at Concord as Battery D, 197th Artillery (Coast Artillery Corps). Redesignated 12 February 1923 as Battery A, 197th Artillery (Coast Artillery Corps). Redesignated 23 April 1924 as Battery A, 197th Coast Artillery. Inducted into federal service 16 September 1940 at Concord. Reorganized and redesignated 15 May 1943 as Battery A, 744th Coast Artillery Battalion. Reorganized and redesignated 15 June 1944 as Battery A, 744th Antiaircraft Artillery Gun Battalion. Inactivated 29 December 1945 at Camp Stoneman, California. Reorganized and federally recognized 3 December 1947 at Concord. Redesignated 1 October 1953 as Battery A, 744th Antiaircraft Artillery Battalion.

=== ANNEX 2 ===
Organized 17 March 1873 in the New Hampshire Volunteer Militia at Manchester as Company F (Governor Straw Rifles), 1st Regiment. (New Hampshire Volunteer Militia redesignated 1 April 1879 as the New Hampshire National Guard). Expanded, reorganized, and redesignated 5 March 1896 as Companies F and L, 1st Regiment. Companies F and L consolidated 15 April 1909 and consolidated unit designated as Company F, 1st Infantry. Mustered into federal service 20 June 1916 at Concord; mustered out of federal service 20 February 1917 at Concord. Mustered into federal service 25 July 1917 at Manchester; drafted into federal service 5 August 1917. Reorganized and redesignated 11 February 1918 as Company F, First Army Headquarters Regiment. Demobilized 26 January 1919 at Camp Dix, New Jersey.

Consolidated 29 June 1921 with the Supply Company, First Army Headquarters Regiment (see ANNEX 4), and consolidated unit reorganized and federally recognized in the New Hampshire National Guard at Manchester as the Service Battery, 172d Field Artillery. Consolidated 1 July 1940 with Headquarters Battery, 172d Field Artillery (organized and federally recognized 15 May 1936 at Manchester), and consolidated unit as Headquarters Battery, 172d Field Artillery. Inducted into federal service 24 February 1941 at Manchester. Reorganized and redesignated 1 March 1943 as Headquarters Battery, 172d Field Artillery Group. Reorganized and redesignated 10 December 1943 as Headquarters Battery, XVI Corps Artillery. Inactivated 7 December 1945 at Camp Kilmer, New Jersey.

Converted and redesignated 23 May 1946 as Headquarters Company, 195th Infantry. Reorganized and federally recognized 31 March 1948 at Manchester. Converted and redesignated 1 December 1954 as Headquarters and Headquarters Battery, 172d Field Artillery Group. Reorganized and redesignated 1 February 1959 as Headquarters and Headquarters Battery, II Corps Artillery.

=== ANNEX 3 ===
Organized 24 June 1916 in the New Hampshire National Guard at Manchester as Field Hospital Company Number 1. Mustered into federal service 25 July 1917 at Manchester; drafted into federal service 5 August 1917. Reorganized and redesignated 25 August 1917 as Field Hospital Company Number 4, an element of the 26th Division. Redesignated 12 December 1917 as Field Hospital Company 104, an element of the 26th Division. Demobilized 29 April 1919 at Camp Devens, Massachusetts.

Consolidated 12 April 1922 with the Sanitary Detachment, First Army Headquarters Regiment (see ANNEX 5), and consolidated unit reorganized and federally recognized in the New Hampshire National Guard at Manchester as the Medical Department Detachment, 172d Field Artillery. Reorganized and redesignated 1 February 1941 as the Medical Detachment, 172d Field Artillery. Inducted into federal service 24 February 1941 at Manchester. Expanded, reorganized, and redesignated 1 March 1943 as the Medical Detachments, 172d and 941st Field Artillery Battalions. Medical Detachment, 172d Field Artillery Battalion, inactivated 19 November 1945 at Camp Patrick Henry, Virginia; Medical Detachment, 941st Field Artillery Battalion, inactivated 23 November 1945 at Camp Myles Standish, Massachusetts. Medical Detachments, 172d and 941st Field Artillery Battalions, consolidated, reorganized, and federally recognized 10 November 1947 at Manchester as the Medical Detachment, 172d Field Artillery Battalion. Converted and redesignated 1 June 1950 as the Medical Company, 195th Infantry. Converted and redesignated 1 December 1954 as Battery C, 172d Field Artillery Battalion. Reorganized and redesignated 1 February 1959 as Battery C, 1st Howitzer Battalion, 172d Artillery. Ordered into active federal service 15 October 1961 at Manchester; released 13 August 1962 from active federal service and reverted to state control. Reorganized and redesignated 1 November 1965 as Battery C, 1st Battalion, 172d Artillery. Reorganized and redesignated 1 December 1967 as Battery A, 197th Artillery. Redesignated 1 May 1972 as Battery A, 197th Field Artillery. Assigned 1 September 1978 to the 50th Armored Division.

=== ANNEX 4 ===
Organized 8 October 1915 in the New Hampshire National Guard at Manchester as the Supply Company, 1st Infantry. Mustered into federal service 20 June 1916 at Concord; mustered out of federal service 20 February 1917 at Concord. Mustered into federal service 25 July 1917 at Manchester; drafted into federal service 5 August 1917. Reorganized and redesignated 11 February 1918 as the Supply Company, First Army Headquarters Regiment. Demobilized 26 January 1919 at Camp Dix, New Jersey.

=== ANNEX 5 ===
Organized 5 March 1917 in the New Hampshire National Guard at Manchester as the Sanitary Detachment, 1st Infantry. Mustered into federal service 25 July 1917 at Manchester; drafted into federal service 5 August 1917. Reorganized and redesignated 11 February 1918 as the Sanitary Detachment, First Army Headquarters Regiment. Demobilized 26 January 1919 at Camp Dix, New Jersey.

HOME STATION: Manchester
