= 197th Ohio Infantry Regiment =

- Active: March 28, 1865, to July 31, 1865
- Country: United States
- Allegiance: Union
- Branch: Infantry

The 197th Ohio Infantry Regiment, sometimes 197th Ohio Volunteer Infantry (or 197th OVI) was an infantry regiment in the Union Army during the American Civil War.

== Service ==
The 197th Ohio Infantry was organized at Camp Chase in Columbus, Ohio, and mustered in March 28, 1865, for one year service under the command of Colonel Benton Halstead.

The regiment left Ohio for Washington, D.C., April 25, 1865, and was assigned to a Provisional Brigade, IX Corps. It served duty at Washington, D.C., and Alexandria, Virginia, until May 11, then moved to Dover, Delaware, and served duty at Camp Harrington until May 31. The regiment was then attached to 3rd Separate Brigade, VIII Corps, to May 1865. Moved to Havre de Grace May 31, and assigned to guard duty on the Philadelphia, Wilmington & Baltimore Railroad by detachments until July. Moved to Baltimore, Maryland, July 3, and served guard duty at various camps and hospitals around that city until July 31.

The 197th Ohio Infantry mustered out of service July 31, 1865, at Baltimore, Maryland.

== Casualties ==
The regiment lost a total of 18 enlisted men during service, all due to disease.

== Commanders ==
- Colonel Benton Halstead

== See also ==
- List of Ohio Civil War units
- Ohio in the Civil War
