= 197th Field Artillery Regiment =

197th Field Artillery
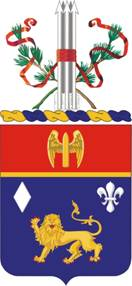
- Coat of arms
- Active: 1922
- Country: United States
- Branch: New Hampshire Army National Guard
- Size: Regiment
- Motto(s): "A Bas L’Avion" (Down With The Plane)

Insignia
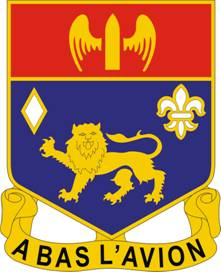
- Distinctive unit insignia

The 197th Field Artillery Regiment is a regiment in the New Hampshire Army National Guard.

== History ==
B Battery claims to have been formed before 1780 as 1st Company, Light Infantry, 2nd Regiment, 2nd Brigade, 2nd Division, New Hampshire Militia. C Battery traces its history to Captain Waldron's Minute Company, 2nd New Hampshire Regiment, which was organized on July 3, 1775, making C Battery one of several National Guard units with colonial roots.

The regiment's coat of arms honors several of its units for their service in the 2nd New Hampshire Volunteer Infantry during the American Civil War.

== Lineage and honors ==
=== Lineage ===
- Headquarters Battery from Company C, 1st Infantry, NHNG (24 April 1922)
- Service Battery from Company C, 1st Infantry, NHNG (29 June 1922)
- Medical Department detachment from new (6 June 1922)
- Headquarters Detachment and Combat Train, 1st Battalion, from new (9 June 1922)
- Battery A (Searchlight) from Company E, 1st Infantry, NHNG (22 December 1921)
- Battery B from the 4th Company, Coast Artillery Corps, NHNG (17 March 1922)
- Battery C from the 2nd Company, Coast Artillery Corps, NHNG (30 March 1922)
- Battery D from the 1st Company, Coast Artillery Corps, NHNG (16 February 1922)
- Headquarters Detachment, 2nd Battalion from Company M, 1st Infantry, NHNG (30 June 1922)
- Battery E from Company I, 1st Infantry, NHNG (6 December 1921)
- Battery F from Company L, 1st Infantry, NHNG (30 June 1922)
- Battery G from Company H, 1st Infantry, NHNG (27 January 1922)
- Battery H from Machine Gun Company, 1st Infantry, NHNG (15 May 1922)

The regiment was redesignated on 23 April 1924 as the 197th Coast Artillery Regiment (Antiaircraft) (Semimobile). It conducted annual training most years at Rye Beach, New Hampshire, and some years at Fort Greble, Maine, Warner, New Hampshire, or Fort Adams, Rhode Island. It was inducted into federal service on 16 September 1940 and transferred to Camp Hulen, Texas, arriving there on 30 September 1940, where it was assigned to the 33rd Coast Artillery Brigade (Antiaircraft) (GHQR) on 10 February 1941. The 3rd Battalion was activated in August 1942. The regiment was broken up on 15 May 1943 as follows:

- Headquarters and Headquarters Battery, as 197th Antiaircraft Artillery Group (see the 197th Field Artillery Brigade)
- 1st Battalion as 744th Antiaircraft Artillery Battalion
- 2d Battalion as 210th Antiaircraft Artillery Battalion
- 3d Battalion as 237th Antiaircraft Artillery Searchlight Battalion

These four units subsequently served in the South West Pacific theatre of World War II. On 1 February 1959, the 744th and 210th AAA Battalions were consolidated with the 197th Artillery, a parent regiment under the Combat Arms Regimental System From 1968-1969, the 3rd Battalion, 197th Artillery served in Vietnam

- B Battery 3-197th-FAR merged with A Battery 2-13th-FAR to form D Battery 2-13th-FAR, "The Jungle Battery".
- Battery E (Target Acquisition), 197th Field Artillery Regiment, was activated 1 June 2012

=== Campaign participation credit ===
==== American Civil War ====
- Bull Run
- Peninsula
- Manassas
- Gettysburg
- Virginia 1864
- Cold Harbor
- Petersburg
- Appomattox

==== World War I ====
- Streamer without inscription

==== World War II ====
- Bismarck Archipelago
- East Indies
- Leyte
- Luzon
- New Guinea
- Southern Philippines

=== Decorations ===
Valorous Unit Award, Meritorious Unit Commendation

== Vietnam (1968–1969) ==
During the Vietnam War, 3rd Battalion 197th-FAR served in country from 1968 to 1969.

=== "Jungle Battery" D BTRY-2nd BN-13th FAR ===
During its time in Vietnam, Bravo Battery 3-197th merged with Alpha Battery 2-13th to form D Battery 2-13th, known in country as "The Jungle Battery". The newly formed D Battery comprised three 155mm Howitzers from B-BTRY and three 105mm Howitzers, allowing it to provide a multitude of artillery support. The unit supported special forces groups for most of its existence. On April 19, 1969, CPT Roland C Labonte was killed by an enemy mortar round. CPT Labonte was the commander of B BTRY 3–197. He is remembered on the Vietnam Wall, (Panel W26, Line 9), as well as a memorial stone outside of the Nashua Armory, still home of B BTRY 3–197, in Nashua NH.

=== Casualties ===
The following are the known losses for 3rd BN-197th FAR during Vietnam, by date.

- 02/26/1969

†Non-Battle SFC Raymond Charles Mroczynski (SVC BTRY)

- 04/19/1969

 † CPT Roland Charles Labonte (B BTRY)

- 06/23/1969

†Non-Battle SGT William George Gray (HHB)

- 07/27/1969

†Non-Battle CPL Mark Lawrence McManus (SVC BTRY)

- 08/24/1969

 † 2LT Thomas Jerome Dostal (A BTRY)

- 08/26/1969

 † SGT Gaetan Jean Guy Beaudoin (A BTRY)
 † SGT Guy Andre Blanchette (A BTRY)
 † SGT Richard Edgar Genest (A BTRY)
 † SFC Richard Paul Raymond (A BTRY)
 † SGT Richard Edward Robichaud (A BTRY)[2]

== Heraldry ==
=== Distinctive unit insignia ===
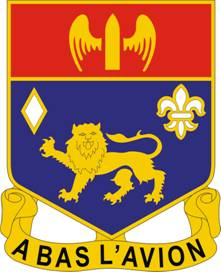

- Description

A Gold color metal and enamel device 1 1/8 inches (2.9 cm) in height overall consisting of a shield blazoned: Azure, in base a lion passant guardant Or, and in fess a lozenge and a fleur-de-lis Argent; on a chief Gules fimbriated of the second a winged projectile, wings inverted, of the last. Attached below the shield a Gold scroll inscribed "A Bas L’Avion" in Black letters.

- Symbolism

The shield is blue to indicate the longer service of the unit as Infantry. The gold lion passant guardant is for service in the War of 1812; the white lozenge—the corps badge for the 2nd Division, 3rd Corps, during the Civil War—represents Civil War service and the fleur-de-lis, service during World War I. The chief is red for Artillery and the winged projectile indicates that it is an anti-aircraft unit.

- Background

The distinctive unit insignia was originally approved for the 197th Coast Artillery Regiment, New Hampshire National Guard on 16 April 1927. It was redesignated for the 744th Antiaircraft Artillery Gun Battalion, New Hampshire National Guard on 28 December 1951. The insignia was redesignated for the 197th Artillery Regiment, New Hampshire National Guard on 29 March 1961. It was redesignated for the 197th Field Artillery Regiment, New Hampshire Army National Guard on 9 August 1972.

=== Coat of arms ===
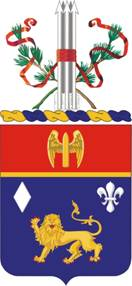

- Blazon
  - Shield: Azure, in base a lion passant guardant Or, and in fess a lozenge and a fleur-de-lis Argent; on a chief Gules fimbriated of the second a winged projectile, wings inverted, of the last.
  - Crest: That for the regiments and separate battalions of the New Hampshire Army National Guard: On a wreath of the colors Or and Azure, two pine branches saltirewise Proper crossed behind a bundle of five arrows palewise Argent, bound together by a ribbon Gules, the ends entwining the branches.

Motto: "A Bas L’Avion" (Down With The Plane).

- Symbolism
  - Shield: The shield is blue to indicate the longer service of the unit as Infantry. The gold lion passant guardant is for service in the War of 1812; the white lozenge—the corps badge for the 2nd Division, 3rd Corps, during the Civil War—represents Civil War service and the fleur-de-lis, service during World War I. The chief is red for Artillery and the winged projectile indicates that it is an anti-aircraft unit.
  - Crest: The crest is that of the New Hampshire Army National Guard.
- Background: The coat of arms was originally approved for the 197th Coast Artillery Regiment, New Hampshire National Guard on 19 April 1927. It was redesignated for the 744th Antiaircraft Artillery Gun Battalion, New Hampshire National Guard on 28 December 1951. The insignia was redesignated for the 197th Artillery Regiment, New Hampshire National Guard on 29 March 1961. It was redesignated for the 197th Field Artillery Regiment, New Hampshire Army National Guard on 9 August 1972.
