= 4th Aviation Regiment (United States) =

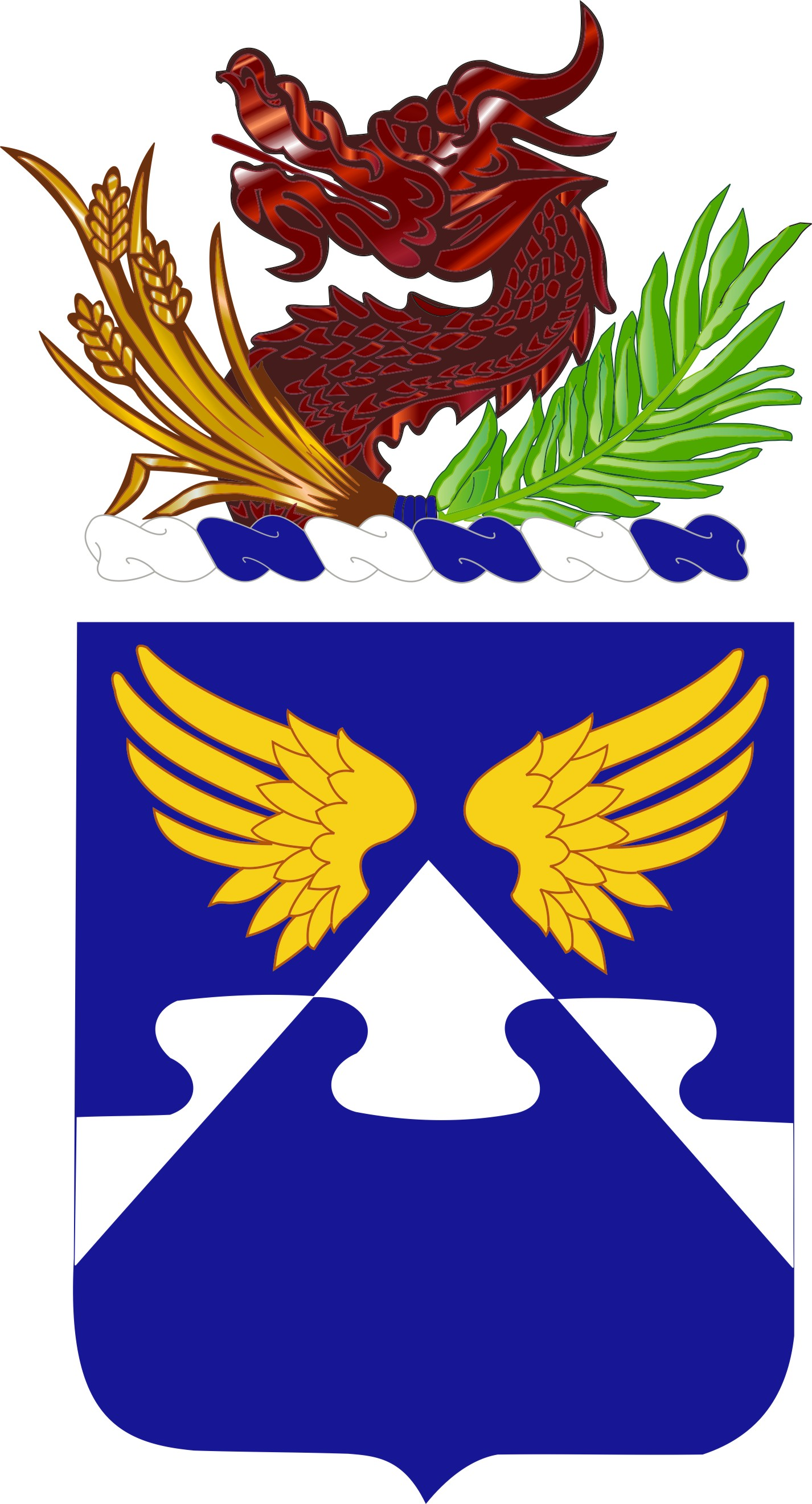
- coat of arms
- Active: 1957-present, antecendants of regiment 1987–present as 4th Aviation Regiment
- Country: United States
- Branch: United States Army Aviation Branch
- Type: Aviation
- Size: Regiment
- Part of: 4th Infantry Division
- Nickname(s): "Ivy Eagles"
- Motto(s): VIGILANTIA AETERNA (eternal vigilance)

Insignia
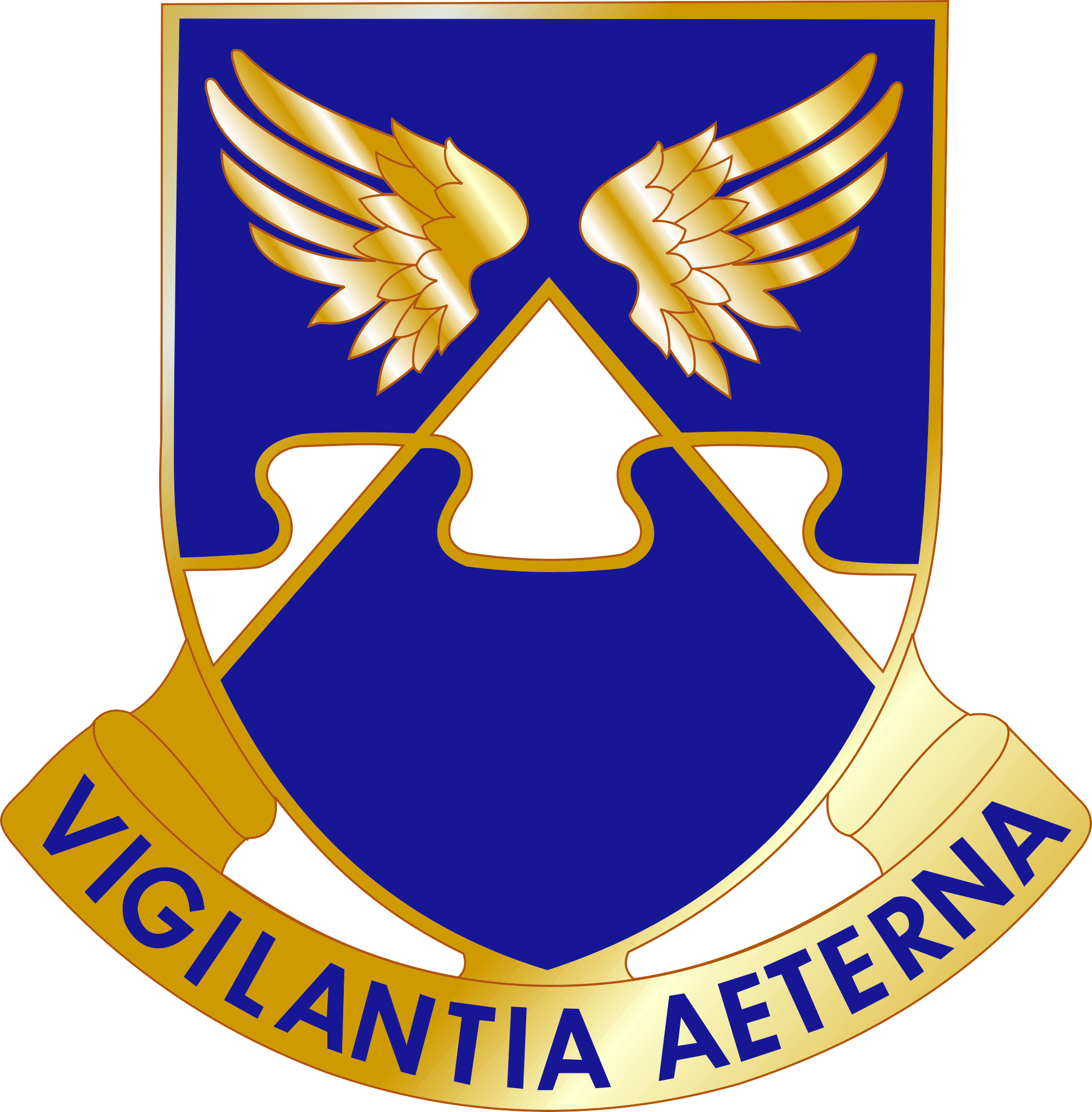
- Distinctive Unit Insignia

Aircraft flown
- Attack helicopter: AH-64D Apache
- Cargo helicopter: CH-47F Chinook
- Utility helicopter: UH-60M Blackhawk

The 4th Aviation Regiment is an aviation regiment of the United States Army, tracing its history back to 1957.

== Lineage ==
The regiment was constituted 1 April 1957 in the Regular Army as the 4th Aviation Company, assigned to the 4th Infantry Division, and activated at Fort Lewis, Washington.

Reorganized and redesignated 1 October 1963 as Headquarters and Headquarters Company, 4th Aviation Battalion (organic elements constituted 21 August 1963 and activated 1 October 1963).

In Vietnam the battalion fought in the official campaigns designated Vietnam; Counteroffensive, Phase II (Operation Sam Houston); Counteroffensive, Phase III (Operation Francis Marion); Tet Counteroffensive (Operation MacArthur); Counteroffensive, Phase IV; Counteroffensive, Phase V; Counteroffensive, Phase VI; Tet 69/Counteroffensive; Summer–Fall 1969; Winter–Spring 1970; Sanctuary Counteroffensive; and Counteroffensive, Phase VII.

During combat operations in Vietnam, the UH-1A Iroquois Huey "slicks" were commonly known as "Black Jacks" and the UH-1D Iroquois gunships were commonly known as "Gamblers.". The 4th Aviation "Attack Reconnaissance" Battalion was stationed at the base of Dragon Mountain, otherwise known as Camp Enari, 4th Infantry Division headquarters, in the Central Highlands of Pleiku, South Vietnam. In 1968, the Bell AH-1 Huey Cobra gunships entered service. The 4th Aviation Battalion gunship motto was "Ace High.".

The battalion was inactivated 4 December 1970 at Fort Lewis, Washington.

Headquarters and Headquarters Company, 4th Aviation Battalion, redesignated 21 November 1972 as Aviation Company, 4th Infantry Division, and activated at Fort Carson, Colorado

Reorganized and redesignated 17 March 1980 as Headquarters and Headquarters Company, 4th Aviation Battalion (organic elements concurrently activated)

Battalion reorganized and redesignated 16 August 1987 as the 4th Aviation, a parent regiment under the United States Army Regimental System. On 1 October 2005 the word 'Regiment' was formally added to the title.

Elements of the regiment participated in the Iraq War, including in 2005–06.

Globalsecurity said about the 4th Aviation Brigade, 4th Division that: On 16 December 2004, the 4th Infantry Division officially became the Army's newest "modular" division. Major additions to the Division included nearly doubling the Aviation Brigade, which was expanded to include a new attack helicopter battalion and an assault helicopter battalion. The aviation brigade increased from 16 AH-64D Apache helicopters in one attack battalion to 48 Apaches in 2 battalions. 2-4th Aviation was also reorganized. Seven CH-47 helicopters from C/7-101st Aviation at Fort Campbell, Kentucky, deployed to Hood Army Airfield, Fort Hood, Texas on 18 November 2004. The helicopters were to become part of 2-4th Aviation. It had been 30 years since Chinooks were assigned to the Division.

As of December 2005, the Combat Aviation Brigade of the 4th Infantry Division was operating out of Camp Taji, Iraq, in support of Operation Iraqi Freedom. The Combat Aviation Brigade was assigned to support the 4th Infantry Division in a wide array of combat and logistical operations during its deployment.

Currently the regiment includes four battalions.

== Current structure ==
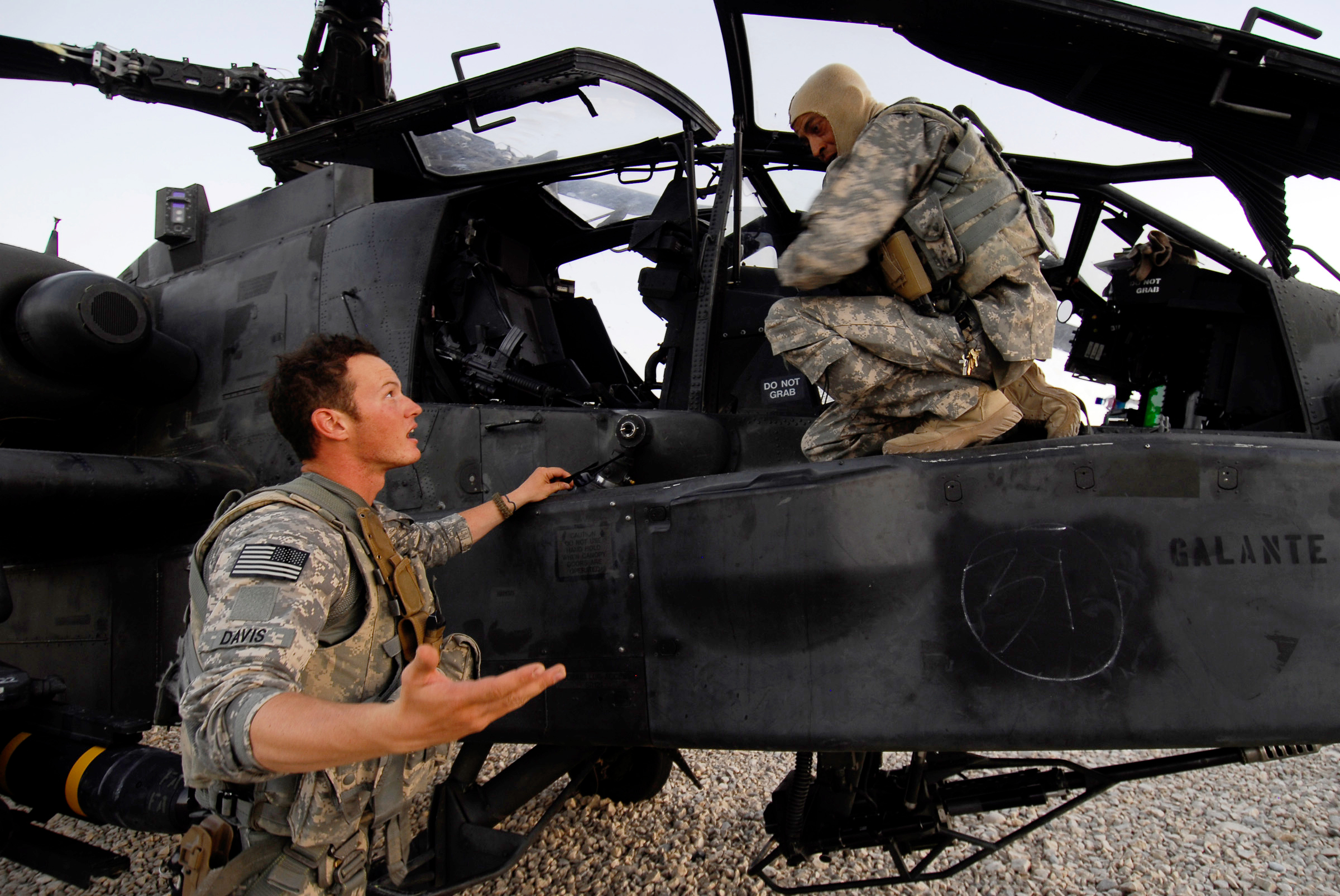
AH-64 Apache helicopter from Company B, 1st Battalion, 4th Aviation Regiment, Attack Reconnaissance Battalion in Kunduz, Afghanistan (Reflagged as 6-17)

- 6th Squadron 17th Air Cavalry Regiment "Out Front"
  - Headquarters & Headquarters Troop (HHT) "Pale Horse"
  - Troop A "Aces"
  - Troop B "Blackfoot"
  - Troop C "Crazy horse"
  - Troop D "Dakota"
  - Troop F "Fury"
- 2nd Battalion (General Support) "Mustangs"
  - Headquarters & Headquarters Company (HHC) "Outlaws"
  - Company A (UH-60) "BlackJacks"
  - Company B (CH-47) "Clydesdales"
  - Company C (HH-60) "Archangel"
  - Company D (Maintenance) "Mavericks"
  - Company E (Support) "Executioners"
  - Company F "Sky Knights"
- 3rd Battalion (Assault Helicopter) "Comanches"
  - Headquarters & Headquarters Company (HHC) "War Chief"
  - Company A (UH-60) "Tomahawks"
  - Company B (UH-60) "Braves"
  - Company C (UH-60) "Warriors"
  - Company D (Maintenance) "Dark Riders"
  - Company E (Support) "Crazy Horse"
- 4th Battalion (Attack) "Gamblers"
  - Headquarters & Headquarters Company (HHC) "High Roller"
  - Company A (AH-64) "Peacemakers"
  - Company B "Brutal"
  - Company C "Jokers"
  - Company D "Darkhorse"
  - Company E "Snakeyes"
  - Company F "Chaos"
- 404th Battalion (Aviation Support) "Providers"
  - Headquarters & Headquarters Company (HHC) "Hellraisers"
  - Company A (Support) "Assassins"
  - Company B (Maintenance) "Mad Dogs"
  - Company C (Signal) "Cobras"

== Decorations ==
- Meritorious Unit Commendation (Army), Streamer embroidered VIETNAM 1967–1968
- Meritorious Unit Commendation (Army), Streamer embroidered IRAQ 2005–2006
- Army Superior Unit Award, Streamer embroidered 1996–1997
- Republic of Vietnam Cross of Gallantry with Palm, Streamer embroidered VIETNAM 1966–1969
- Republic of Vietnam Cross of Gallantry with Palm, Streamer embroidered VIETNAM 1969–1970
- Republic of Vietnam Civil Action Honor Medal, First Class, Streamer embroidered VIETNAM 1969–1970
