= 39th Infantry Division (United States) =

- 39th ID Shoulder Sleeve Insignia
- Active: 18 July 1917–23 January 1919; 27 May 1946–1 December 1967; redesignated 39th Infantry Brigade
- Country: United States
- Branch: Army
- Type: Infantry
- Role: Headquarters
- Size: Division
- Part of: Army National Guard
- Nickname: "Delta Division"
- Colors: Red and blue
- Engagements: World War I

Commanders
- Notable commanders: Henry Clay Hodges Jr. Raymond H. Fleming

The 39th Infantry Division (Delta Division) was an infantry formation of the Army National Guard, originally formed as the 18th Division in 1917. The division consisted of troops from Arkansas, Louisiana, and Mississippi. After training at Camp Beauregard, Louisiana, the division was deployed to France but did not see combat before the end of World War I. In July 1923 the division was re-designated as the 31st Infantry Division. The 39th Infantry Division was reactivated after World War II with troops from Louisiana and Arkansas and its headquarters in Louisiana. In 1967, the 39th Infantry Division was reorganized to become the 39th Infantry Brigade (Separate). Its headquarters was in Little Rock and the unit consisted entirely of troops from Arkansas.

== History ==
=== World War I ===
In July 1917, a few weeks after the American entry into World War I, it was announced that National Guard units from Arkansas, Mississippi, and Louisiana would be assigned to Alexandria, Louisiana, for training as the 18th Division. Alexandria is the location of Camp Beauregard, named after General P. G. T. Beauregard, C.S.A.

==== Re-numbering and loss of state designations ====
Upon transfer to Camp Beauregard, all National Guard units were stripped of their state designations and re-numbered under a new federal system. At this time the division of troops from Arkansas, Louisiana, and Mississippi was re-

designated the 39th Division. The 39th "Delta" Division was composed of:

Headquarters	New unit designation	Former state designation	State
39th Division	HQ and HQ Company	2nd Separate Troop, Louisiana Cavalry	Louisiana
77th Infantry Brigade	153rd Infantry Regiment	1st Arkansas Infantry	Arkansas
	154th Infantry Regiment	3rd Arkansas Infantry (Minus 3rd Battalion), Companies G, I, M, 1st Louisiana Infantry, less one third men; 1st Battalion, 2nd Mississippi Infantry	Arkansas, Mississippi, Louisiana
	141st Machine Gun Battalion	3rd Battalion, 3rd Arkansas Infantry plus Machine Gun Company from 2nd Arkansas Infantry	Arkansas
78th Infantry Brigade	155th Infantry Regiment	1st Mississippi Infantry, attachments from Companies F and H, 2nd Mississippi Infantry	Mississippi
	156th Infantry Regiment	1st Louisiana Infantry, less companies G, H, I, K, L, and M	Louisiana
	142nd Machine Gun Battalion	Companies H and L, 1st Louisiana Infantry	Louisiana
64th Field Artillery Brigade	140th Field Artillery Regiment (75 mm)	1st Mississippi Field Artillery	Mississippi
	141st Field Artillery Regiment (75 mm)	1st Louisiana Field Artillery, less 2 officers and 120 men	Louisiana
	142nd Field Artillery Regiment (155 mm)	2nd Arkansas Infantry, Minus Machine Gun Company	Arkansas
	114th Trench Mortar Battery	2 Officers and 120 Men, 1st Louisiana Field Artillery	Louisiana
Divisional Troops	140th Machine Gun Battalion	Machine Gun Troop, 2nd Separate Squadron, Mississippi Cavalry, 3rd Battalion and Companies G and Machine Gun Company, 2nd Mississippi Infantry	Mississippi
	114th Engineer Regiment	Company A, Mississippi Engineers, one third enlisted men from Companies G, I, and M, 1st Louisiana Infantry, Band and one half enlisted men from Company E, 2nd Mississippi Infantry	Mississippi, Louisiana
	114th Field Signal Battalion	One half enlisted men from Company K, 1st Louisiana Infantry, one half enlisted men from Company K, 1st Louisiana Infantry	Mississippi, Louisiana
	114th Train Headquarters and Military Police	Headquarters and Headquarters Company (less Band), Supply Company, Part of companies F and H, 2nd Mississippi Infantry, and one half the enlisted men from the 1st Louisiana Infantry	Mississippi, Louisiana
	114th Ammunition Train	1st Arkansas Ammunition Train, minus 257 men. 1st Mississippi Field Hospital, 1st Louisiana Field Hospital, 1st Separate Squadron (Less Machine Gun Troop), plus 193 men from 2nd Separate Squadron, Mississippi Cavalry. 1st Mississippi Field Hospital, 1st Louisiana Field Hospital	Arkansas, Mississippi
	114th Supply Train	2nd Separate Squadron, Mississippi Cavalry, Minus 193 Men, Plus 257 men from the 1st Arkansas Ammunition Train	Arkansas, Mississippi
	114th Engineer Train	Transfers from the 114th Engineers and Draftees	Mississippi
	114th Sanitary Train (Ambulance Companies & Field Hospitals 153, 154, 155, 156)	1st Arkansas Ambulance Company and the 1st Arkansas Field Hospital, 1st Mississippi Field Hospital, 1st Louisiana Field Hospital	Arkansas, Mississippi, Louisiana

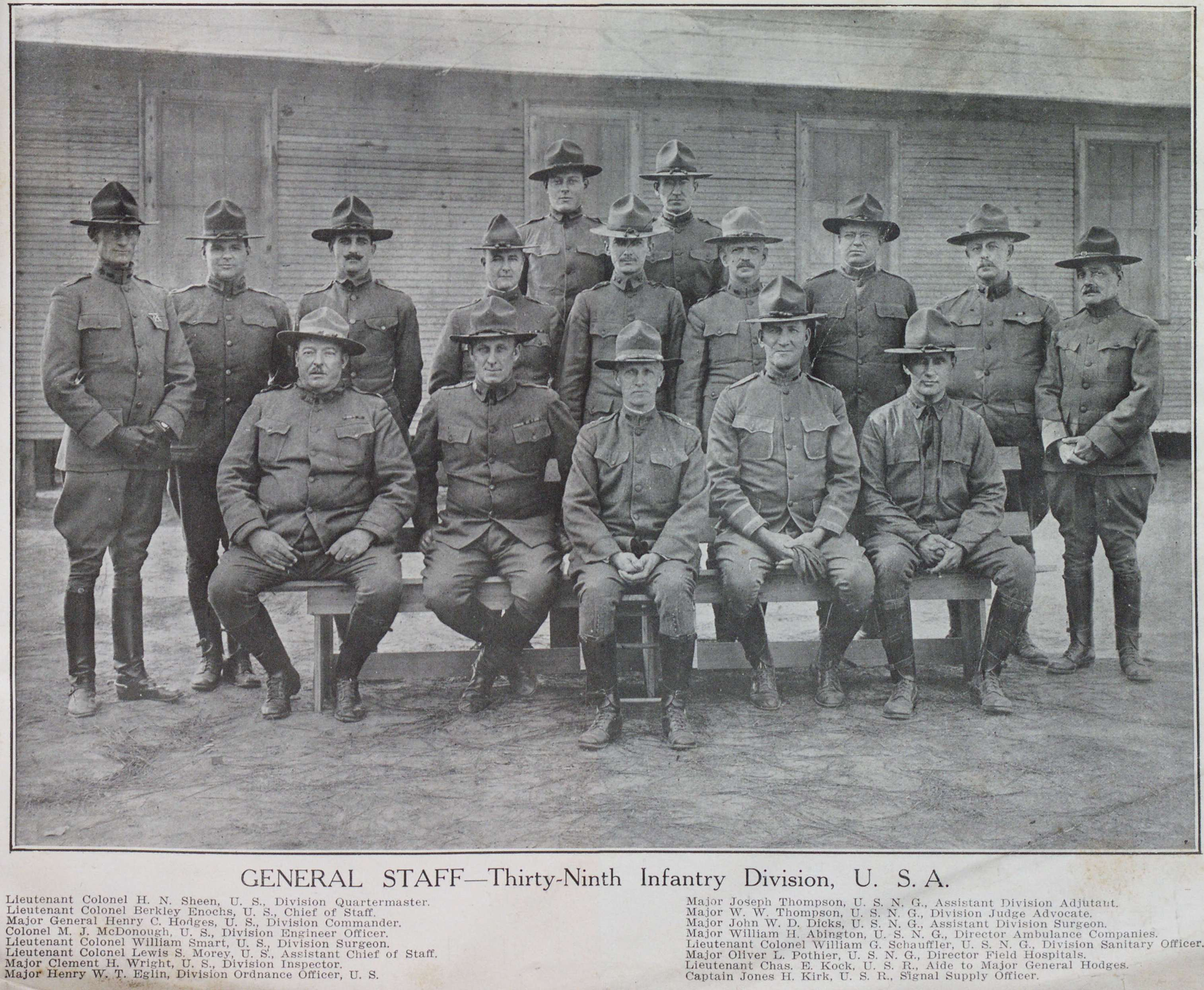
Major General Henry C. Hodges Jr., seated in the front row, third from the left, together with members of the staff of his 39th Division, 1918.

Sickness was a problem for the National Guard troops while at Camp Beauregard. In the later part of October 1917, measles kept the men from drilling. In January 1918, the National Guard Reserve was transferred to the active list. In the same month, the town of Alexandria was placed off limits, and soldiers could not visit other regiments because of an outbreak of meningitis. The off-limits order lasted until 6 March 1918. The soldiers were instructed in the use of deadly gases and then exposed to tear gas, which complicated the health concerns. The soldiers complained about the bugs and were anxious to go to France. By March 1918, the soldiers had received new Enfield rifles. Camp Beauregard was struck with Spanish influenza in early October 1918, which led to lobar pneumonia in many patients. All available facilities were used when the hospitals became overcrowded. The 39th Division was brought up to strength with the addition of soldiers from Ohio, Illinois, and Kentucky.

The entire 39th Division passed in review for the governors of Mississippi and Louisiana in April.

==== Deployed to France ====
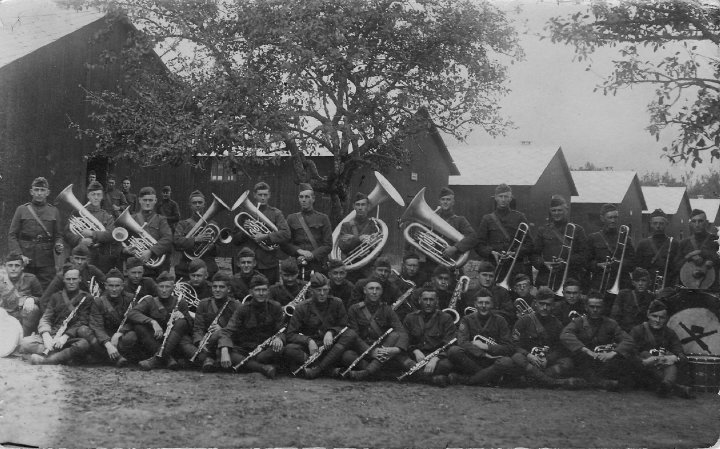
142nd Field Artillery Regimental Band, in France, 1918.

The army units already engaged in theater were suffering from a personnel shortage. The army had no system for providing replacement soldiers for unit losses. In May 1918, the army offered privates the opportunity to volunteer for duty overseas by agreeing to transfer out of the 39th Division. In the rush to help end the war, officers resigned their commissions so they would qualify for duty overseas before the war was over. Shortly thereafter, Private Robert Springer was the first state guardsman to lose his life in France. Approximately 20 percent of the soldiers of the 39th Division were allowed to volunteer to deploy as individual replacements. In June 1918 the individual replacements arrived in France. The officers remained at Camp Beauregard with the other 80 per cent that were still in training. At Camp Beauregard the division was brought to full strength by the arrival of troops from Camp Zachary Taylor (men from the states of Ohio, Illinois, and Kentucky).

It took 12 months for the entire 39th Division organization to reach France, where it remained for three months, before the war ended. At the time of its departure from the United States, the 39th Division was composed of 22 percent Arkansas National Guard, 40 per cent National Army draftees, and 10 per cent shortage from authorized strength.

The 39th Division, less its artillery units, left Camp Beauregard on 1 August, and sailed for overseas service on 6 August 1918. The first unit of the 39th Division arrived in France on 12 August, and the last unit arrived on 12 September.

==== Designation as depot division ====
The 39th Division was designated as the Fifth Depot Division on 14 August 1918, and moved to St. Florent area south-west of Bourges. The greatest American involvement in World War I, the Meuse-Argonne Offensive, began on 26 September. The divisions were so depleted after one week of combat that General John "Blackjack" Pershing, commanding the American Expeditionary Force (AEF) on the Western Front, ordered personnel from the 84th and 86th Divisions, which had just arrived in France, to be used as replacements. The arrangement was supposed to be temporary, and at first only men from infantry and machine gun units served as replacements. Eventually all divisional personnel were taken, except for one enlisted man per company and one officer per regiment who maintained unit records. The manpower shortage persisted. The 31st, 34th, and 38th Divisions were stripped of their personnel and their men used as replacements. The high casualty rate took a toll on all combat units, and Pershing slashed the authorized strength of infantry and machine gun companies from 250 to 175 enlisted men, thereby temporarily reducing each division by 4,000 men.

The units of the 39th, (not the 5th Depot Division) served as training cadres whose duties were to receive, train, equip, and forward replacements of both officers and men for the infantry units and machine gun units, and for ammunition and supply trains. On 29 October 1918, the 39th Division was "skeletonized" with most of the remaining men assigned as replacements and the senior officers attached to the 1st Depot Division (41st Division) at St. Aignan.">

While scrambling for personnel, Pershing reorganized the replacement system, and tried to improve its responsiveness to the flexible army corps and army organizations. Pershing ordered the 40th and 85th Divisions to serve as regional replacement depots for the First and Second Armies, respectively, and the 41st and 83rd as depot divisions in the Services of Supply. Eventually, the 39th and 76th Divisions were stripped of their personnel. The replacement system remained unsatisfactory to the end of the war.

==== Some units remained intact ====
In November 1918, the 39th Division moved to St. Aignan, where several of the units were transferred to combat divisions.

The 64th Field Artillery Brigade remained intact and was designated as corps artillery.

The 114th Engineers, 39th Division, were transferred to the I Army Corps in France. The 114th Engineers laid railroad tracks and built bridges for the I Army Corps during the Meuse-Argonne drive. Some of the division's machine gun battalions began training for a new role when they were re-designated as Anti Aircraft Machine Gun Battalions. They were still in training at the time the armistice was signed.

=== Demobilization ===
Most former guardsmen began returning to the United States during January and February 1919. The division returned to the United States for demobilization between 30 November 1919, and 1 May 1919. The division demobilized the following month at Camp Beauregard, Louisiana. With the war ended, the 153rd Infantry landed in Hoboken, New Jersey, 27 February 1919, making the crossing aboard the USS President Grant.

On 12 April 1919, the transport SS Kaiserin Auguste Victoria brought the 64th Field Artillery Brigade and the 141st Machine Gun Battalion of the 39th Division to New York. The headquarters, ordnance, and medical detachments, and some companies of the 114th Engineers, 39th Division were transported to Newport News, Virginia, on the battleship USS Nebraska.

The 142nd stayed in France to conduct tests and exercises to develop techniques for motorized artillery battalions and won a commendation for efficient performance. In March 1919, the 1st Battalion, 142nd Artillery, 39th Division was acting as a school battalion for the entire artillery forces of the American Expeditionary Forces with their headquarters at Valdahon, France. In May 1919, word reached Little Rock that the 142nd Field Artillery Battalion (old 2nd Arkansas) was doing convoy duty with the Army of Occupation and a segment was still firing for the Artillery School at Camp Valdahon. It was not until early June when the 142nd Field Artillery left France on the transport USS Amphion. They arrived 15 June 1919, at Newport News, Virginia. On the train trip to Little Rock the 142nd Field Artillery marched in a parade in Atlanta. On 21 June 1919, the group arrived at Camp Pike. On the following day the 142nd Field Artillery was featured in a big parade in Little Rock and then treated to a big show and picnic in the park.

The last group of Guardsmen to return to the United States for discharge was the 114th Sanitary Train (formerly the 1st Arkansas Ambulance Company and the 1st Arkansas Field Hospital), Seventh Army Corps. The 114th Sanitary Train had been stationed for six months at Wittlick, Germany, before being transferred back to the United States.

=== Unauthorized World War I patch ===
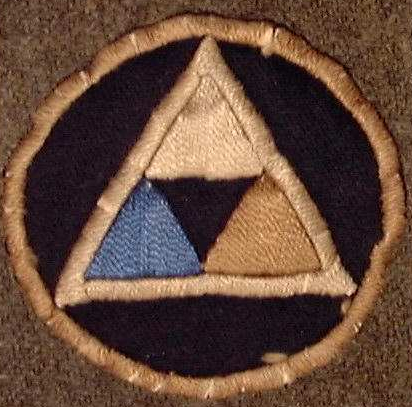
Unauthorized World War 1 39th "Delta" Division shoulder sleeve insignia

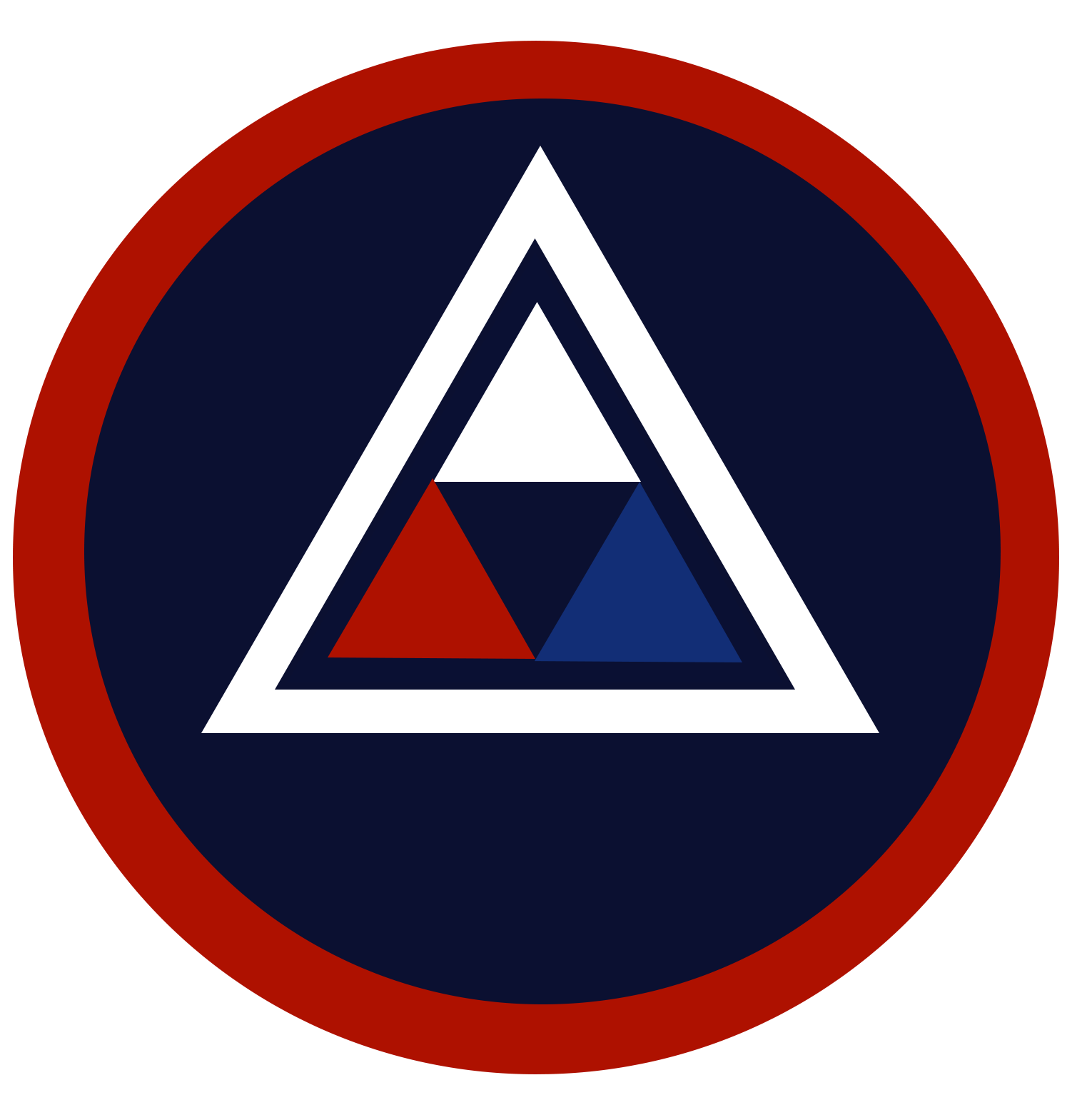
39th Infantry Division Patch WWI - Gen. Hodges design

The 39th Division had been organized from National Guard units from Arkansas, Louisiana, and Mississippi, and had adopted the name "Delta Division" since they were from the delta region of the Mississippi River. After being assigned as a depot division and eventually skeletonized, nothing had been done to adopt a shoulder patch until January 1919, when the 64th Field Artillery Brigade proposed a design for the division's insignia. The 64th had remained intact and had been reassigned as a Corps Artillery unit. The brigade commander, Brigadier General Ira A. Haynes, was the senior officer of what remained of the 39th Division. Haynes attempted to consult with the former division commander, Brigadier General Henry Clay Hodges Jr., but Hodges had been reassigned to Scholfield Barracks in Hawaii. Haynes issued General Order #1, 64th Field Artillery Brigade, on 18 January 1919, which described the insignia and authorized its wear by remaining division personnel. The design was submitted to American Expeditionary Forces (AEF) for approval, but was rejected on the grounds than it only applied to the 64th Field Artillery Brigade (brigades were not authorized to have separate patches) and that the design was too similar to the Third Army patch. Haynes applied for reconsideration and, this time, was able to gain the support of Hodges. In his request for reconsideration, Haynes wrote, "The States of Arkansas, Louisiana and Mississippi have long been known as the Delta States. The 39th Division was known to ourselves at least as the Delta Division and our baggage was marked in that way. We take pride in Honoring the State of our origin..." The U.S. Army Adjutant General did not approve the patch, and told Hodges that it would be retained on file, and if the 39th Division were ever activated again, it would be reconsidered. When the 39th Division was reorganized following World War II, a different design was adopted. Nevertheless, many soldiers of the old 39th Division returned home wearing the unauthorized patch.

The World War I patch consisted of a dark blue disc bordered red having upon it a steel gray triangle (the Greek Delta symbol). The area within the triangle was divided into four equilateral triangles, with the lower left red, the top white, the lower right blue, and the central triangle the same dark blue as the disk. There are numerous variations of the World War I design, with the colors of the triangles transposed in various combinations. One common variant has three inner triangles instead of the prescribed four.

=== Interwar period ===
After the war, the division was reorganized in Alabama, Arkansas, Florida, Louisiana, and Mississippi. Because of the change of geographic area, the National Guard requested the division to be re-organized less the Arkansas elements and re-designated as the 31st Infantry Division. The re-designation was approved on 1 July 1923, and the 39th Division disappeared from the rolls until after World War II.

=== Cold War ===
The 39th Infantry Division was reconstituted on 30 September 1946. It was composed of units from Arkansas (headquartered in Little Rock, Arkansas) and Louisiana (headquartered at Jackson Barracks, New Orleans). The division artillery commander, a brigadier general, was assigned to command the Arkansas portion of the division, while the division commander remained in Louisiana. During this period the division included the following combat arms units:

153rd Infantry Regiment, Arkansas National Guard
156th Infantry Regiment, Louisiana National Guard
199th Infantry Regiment, Louisiana National Guard
Division Artillery (DIVARTY)

445th Field Artillery Battalion Arkansas National Guard
437th Field Artillery Battalion Arkansas National Guard
935th Field Artillery Battalion Louisiana National Guard
141st Field Artillery Battalion Louisiana National Guard

Armor Unit

206th Tank Battalion

==== Arkansas stationing 1946–59 ====
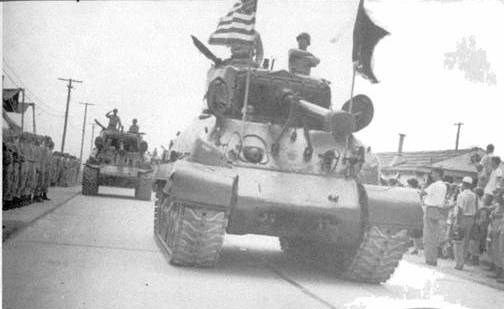
Elements of the 206th Heavy Tank Battalion pass in review during Annual Training 1950.

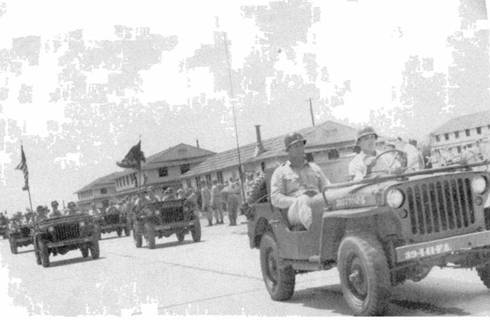
Elements of the 141st Field Artillery Battalion at Fort Polk Louisiana during Annual Training, 1950.

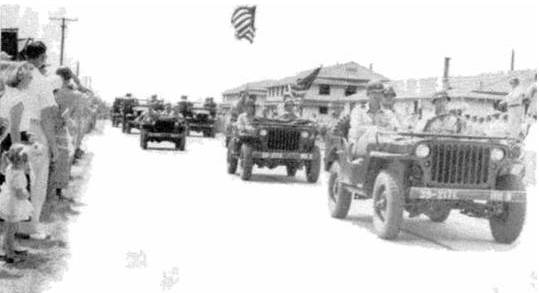
Elements of the 217th Engineer Battalion, during Annual Training, 1950.

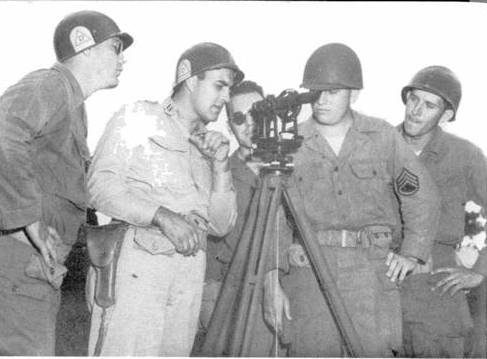
Soldiers of the 39th Division Artillery conduct Survey Training during Annual Training, 1950.

Headquarters	Company	Station
39th Division Headquarters (Arkansas Part)		Little Rock
153 Infantry Regiment	HHC, 153rd IN	Little Rock
	Service Company	Searcy
	Tank Company	Pine Bluff
	Heavy Mortar Company	DeQueen
	Medical Company	Little Rock
1st Battalion, 153 Infantry Regiment	Headquarters and Headquarters Company	Texarkana
	Company A, 1–153 IN	Hope
	Company B, 1–153 IN	Malvern
	Company C, 1–153 IN	Prescott
	Company D, 1–153 IN	Arkadelphia
2nd Battalion, 153 Infantry Regiment	Headquarters and Headquarters Company	Morrilton
	Company E, 2-153 IN	Clarksville
	Company F, 2-153 IN	Dardanelle
	Company G, 2-153 IN	Conway
	Company H, 2-153 IN	Russellville
3rd Battalion, 153 Infantry Regiment	Headquarters and Headquarters Company	Beebe
	Company I, 3-153 IN	Jonesboro
	Company K, 3-153 IN	Walnut Ridge
	Company L, 3-153 IN	Batesville
	Company M, 3-153 IN Command	Blytheville
445th Field Artillery Battalion	Headquarters and Headquarters Battery	Marianna
	Battery A, 445th FA	Helena
	Battery B, 445th FA	Newport
	Battery C, 445th FA	Brinkley
	Service Battery, 445th FA	Wynne, Arkansas
437th Field Artillery Battalion	Headquarters and Headquarters Battery	Hazen
	Battery A, 437th FA	Hot Springs
	Battery B, 437th FA	Newport
	Battery C, 437th FA	Dumas
	Service Battery, 437th FA	Brinkley
217th Engineer Battalion	Headquarters and Headquarters Company	Russellville
	Company A, 217th EN	Russellville
	Company B, 217th EN	Monticello
	Company C, 217th EN	Magnolia
	Company D, 217th EN	McGehee
	Medical Detachment, 217th EN	Russellville
206th Tank Battalion	Headquarters and Headquarters Company	El Dorado
	Company A, 206th Tank BN	Warren
	Company B, 206th Tank BN	Camden
	Company C, 206th Tank BN	Fordyce
	Company D, 206th Tank BN	Crossett
	Medical Detachment, 206th Tank BN	Fordyce
125th Medical Battalion	Headquarters and Headquarters Company	Little Rock
	Clearing Company, 125th Med BN	Little Rock
	Ambulance Company, 125th Med BN	Little Rock
739th Ordnance Battalion	Headquarters and Headquarters Company	Little Rock
	Company A, 739th Ord BN	Little Rock
	Company B, 739th Ord BN	Little Rock
39th Division Artillery	Headquarters and Headquarters Battery	Little Rock
	39th Replacement Company	Little Rock
	39th Military Police Company	Little Rock

">

==== Pentomic division 1959 ====
In 1959, the division was reorganized, along with all other National Guard divisions, in accordance with the new Pentomic Division Concept. This concept attempted to provide a new divisional structure to fight on the atomic battlefield.

The reorganization resulted in the end of the regiment as a tactical unit. Traditionally, regiments were the basic branch element, especially for the infantry, and their long histories had produced deep traditions considered essential to unit esprit de corps. The new divisional structure, replacing infantry regiments with anonymous battle groups, threatened to destroy all of these traditions. Secretary of the Army Wilber M. Brucker settled the question on 24 January 1957 when he approved the Combat Arms Regimental System. Although regiments (armored cavalry notwithstanding) would no longer exist as tactical units, certain distinguished regiments were to become "parent" organizations for the combat arms. Under the new concept, the Department of the Army assumed control of regimental headquarters – the repository for a unit's lineage, honors, and traditions – and used elements of the regiments to organize battle groups, battalions, squadrons, companies, batteries, and troops, which shared in the history and honors of their parent units.

In place of the regiment or brigade, the new pentomic infantry division fielded five battle groups, each containing 1,356 soldiers.

The 156th Infantry and 199th Infantry (less 3d Battalion) consolidated 1 July 1959 and the consolidated unit was reorganized as the 156th Infantry, a parent regiment under the Combat Arms Regimental System, to consist of the 1st, 2nd, and 3rd Battle Groups, elements of the 39th Infantry Division.

The 153rd Infantry was reorganized 1 June 1959 as a parent regiment under the Combat Arms Regimental System, to consist of the 1st, and 2nd, Battle Groups, elements of the 39th Infantry Division.

As a part of the reorganization of 1959 and the shift to the Combat Army Regimental System, the artillery units assigned to the Division were re-designated to their historical artillery regiments:

The 445th Field Artillery Battalion, Arkansas National Guard, was re-designated as the 1st Battalion, 206th Artillery, and was organized as a composite battalion with one battery of 105 mm towed howitzers and one battery of 155 mm towed howitzers.

The 437th Field Artillery Battalion, Arkansas National Guard, was re-designated as the 2nd Battalion, 206th Artillery and was organized as a composite battalion with one battery of 105 mm towed howitzers and one battery of 155 mm towed howitzers.

The 935th Field Artillery Battalion, Louisiana National Guard, was consolidated with the 141st Field Artillery Battalion and the consolidated unit was re-designated as the 1st Battalion, 141st Artillery. The new battalion was organized as a composite battalion with one battery of 105 mm towed howitzers and one battery of 155 mm towed howitzers.

A new battalion was created in the Arkansas National Guard from existing units, 3rd Battalion, 206th Artillery was a composite unit with one 8-inch howitzer battery and one MGR-1 Honest John rocket battery.

==== Reorganization 1963 ====
By 1963 the army again changed the basic design for a division. The battle groups of the pentomic division had proved to be unwieldy, and it was felt that their span of control was not sufficient to handle all of the various units and troops assigned to their command. The army reverted to the infantry battalion as the basic building block and provided for additional command and control by providing a brigade headquarters. The 1st and 2nd Brigade, 39th Division were allocated to the Louisiana National Guard, while the 3rd Brigade was allocated to the Arkansas National Guard.

The 153rd Infantry was reorganized to consist of the 1st, 2nd, and 3rd Battalions.

The 156th Infantry was reorganized to consist of the 1st, 2nd, 3rd and 4th Battalions.

The 1st Battalion, 206th Field Artillery was deactivated and the 3rd Battalion, 142nd Field Artillery was added to the 39th Division Artillery. The 3rd Battalion, 142nd Field Artillery had previously been under the command and control of the 142nd Field Artillery Group.

The 3rd Battalion, 206th Field Artillery was reduced to one Honest John Rocket Battery, Battery A.

The 206th Armor was expanded to consist of the 1st and 2nd Battalion, 206th Armor Regiment.

==== Little Rock Central High School integration crisis ====
The Arkansas portion of the 39th Infantry Division were ordered into active federal service on 24 September 1957 at home stations, in support of the Little Rock Central High School integration crisis in Little Rock Arkansas. The 1st and 3rd Battalions of the 153rd Infantry Regiment were mobilized at Camp Robinson for duty at Central High School. Task Force 153rd Infantry remained on duty at Central High School for the remainder of the 1957–1958 school year. The task force was constantly mentioned in daily situation report for President Eisenhower. The 39th was released on 24 October 1957 from active federal service and reverted to state control.

==== 39th Infantry Brigade ====
During the 1960s, the Department of Defense continued to scrutinize the reserve forces. It questioned the number of divisions and brigades, as well as the redundancy of maintaining two reserve components, the National Guard and the Army Reserve. In 1967, Secretary of Defense Robert McNamara decided that 15 combat divisions in the Army National Guard were unnecessary. He cut the number to eight divisions (one mechanized infantry, two armored, and five infantry), but increased the number of brigades from seven to 18 (one airborne, one armored, two mechanized infantry, and 14 infantry). The loss of the divisions did not set well with the states. Their objections included the inadequate maneuver element mix for those that remained and the end to the practice of rotating divisional commands among the states that supported them. Under the proposal, the remaining division commanders were to reside in the state of the division base. No reduction, however, in total Army National Guard strength was to take place, which convinced the governors to accept the plan. The states reorganized their forces accordingly between 1 December 1967 and 1 May 1968.

On 1 December 1967, the Arkansas portion of the 39th Division was reorganized and redesignated as the 39th Infantry Brigade. The new 39th Infantry Brigade (Separate) was composed of elements of the following units:

- 1st Battalion, 153rd Infantry Regiment
- 2nd Battalion, 153rd Infantry Regiment
- 3rd Battalion, 153rd Infantry Regiment
- Troop E, 151st Cavalry Regiment
- 5th Battalion, 206th Field Artillery Regiment
- 39th Support Battalion

The division's units from Louisiana were reassigned to the newly created 256th Infantry Brigade. The 256th Infantry Brigade (Separate) was composed of the following units:

- 1st Battalion, 156th Infantry Regiment
- 2nd Battalion, 156th Infantry Regiment
- 3rd Battalion, 156th Infantry Regiment
- Troop A, 108th Cavalry Regiment
- 1st Battalion, 141st Field Artillery Regiment
- 256th Support Battalion

== Current unit ==
The 39th Division is currently known as the 39th Infantry Brigade Combat Team (United States), of the Arkansas Army National Guard, headquartered at the Robinson Maneuver Training Center, North Little Rock, Arkansas.

== Commanding officers ==
Major General Henry Clay Hodges Jr.	1917–1919
Brigadier General Ira A. Haynes (temporary ad interim)	17 to 30 September 1917, 27 November 1917 to 26 February 1918.
Major General Raymond H. Fleming	1946–1951
Major General Joseph A. Redding	1951–1957
BG John B. Webb	1957–1958
MG George W. Trousdale	1958–1963
MG Lincoln M Cummings	1963–1967
