= Raymond H. Fleming =

Army National Guard officer (1889–1974)

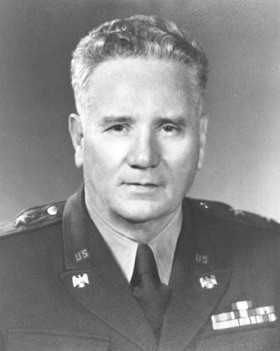
- Fleming in uniform, c. 1951
- Born: July 5, 1889; Waxahachie, Texas, US
- Died: November 23, 1974 (aged 85); New Orleans, Louisiana, US
- Burial place: Hillcrest Burial Park Cemetery, Waxahachie, Texas, US
- Military career
- Allegiance: United States
- Branch: United States Army
- Service years: 1916 - 1964
- Rank: Major General
- Units: Louisiana Army National Guard; National Guard Bureau
- Commands: 55th Cavalry Brigade; Adjutant General of Louisiana; 39th Infantry Division; Chief, Army Division, National Guard Bureau; Chief of the National Guard Bureau
- Conflicts: Pancho Villa Expedition; World War I World War II
- Awards: Distinguished Service Medal (U.S. Army); Legion of Merit

Raymond H. Fleming (July 5, 1889—November 23, 1974) was a United States Army Major General who served as Chief of the National Guard Bureau, commander of the 39th Infantry Division (the "Delta Division"), and Adjutant General of Louisiana.

== Early life ==
Raymond Hartwell Fleming was born in Waxahachie, Texas, on July 5, 1889. He graduated from San Antonio's Trinity University in 1915 and moved to Louisiana.

== Pancho Villa Expedition ==
Fleming joined the Louisiana National Guard in 1916 and served on the Mexican border during the Pancho Villa Expedition, attaining the rank of Sergeant.

== World War I ==
In 1917 Fleming received his commission as a second lieutenant. Assigned to the 141st Field Artillery Regiment, he served in France throughout World War I, advancing to captain as commander of Battery D. His unit was mustered out in 1919, and he returned to Louisiana.

== Post World War I ==
After the war Fleming continued his membership in the Louisiana National Guard and took part in its reorganization. He commanded Batteries A and D of the 141st Field Artillery Regiment as a captain, and continued to advance through the ranks in command and staff positions of increasing responsibility. He graduated from the United States Army Command and General Staff College in 1925 and the United States Army War College in 1928.

Fleming also continued his academic studies by undertaking post-graduate work in economics and labor relations at Tulane University.

== Adjutant General of Louisiana ==
In 1928 Fleming was appointed Adjutant General of the Louisiana National Guard with the rank of brigadier general. He continued to serve in this position until 1948.

Seen as an ally of the political organization run by Senator Huey Long and Governor O.K. Allen, in 1934 Fleming deployed National Guardsmen to the offices of election officials in New Orleans when Allen declared martial law during a disputed election between the Long-Allen group and a group headed by Mayor T. Semmes Walmsley. In response, Walmsley deployed hundreds of New Orleans police officers. Fleming was charged with contempt of court for refusing a judge's order to dismiss the troops. The dispute was resolved when the National Guard vacated the election offices (while remaining in New Orleans) and the police stood down, and the election proceeded as planned.

When Long was assassinated in 1935, Fleming commanded the honor guard for his funeral.

From 1940 to 1946 Fleming also commanded the 55th Cavalry Brigade, a unit of the 23rd Cavalry Division.

From 1940 to 1947 Fleming also concurrently served during World War II as the federal Director of Selective Service for Louisiana.

== Post World War II ==
In 1946 Fleming was named commander of the 39th Infantry Division, an assignment he carried out while still serving as Adjutant General. He was promoted to major general in 1947.

== National Guard Bureau ==
Fleming was appointed Chief of the Army Division at the National Guard Bureau in 1947. He was the first individual to hold this post, which was created as a result of the founding of the Air National Guard. The Chief of the Army Division and Chief of the Air Division each reported to the Chief of the National Guard Bureau.

In 1948 also took on an additional assignment as an Assistant to Lewis B. Hershey, the federal Director of Selective Service.

In 1950 Fleming was named acting Chief of the National Guard Bureau, succeeding Kenneth F. Cramer. In 1951 Fleming's nomination was confirmed, and he served as NGB Chief until reaching the federal military's mandatory retirement age in 1953.

In 1951 he was succeeded as commander of the 39th Infantry Division by Joseph A. Redding.

== Return as Adjutant General ==
In 1952 Fleming was reappointed as Louisiana's Adjutant General, serving until 1956. He resumed the Adjutant General's post again in 1960, serving until his 1964 retirement.

== Awards and decorations ==
Fleming's awards included the Distinguished Service Medal (U.S. Army) and Legion of Merit.

== Retirement and death ==
In retirement Fleming resided in New Orleans. He died there on November 23, 1974, and was buried in Waxahachie's Hillcrest Burial Park Cemetery.

== Legacy ==
The headquarters building at Jackson Barracks was named Fleming Hall. The building was damaged during Hurricane Katrina, but has since been rehabilitated. It is now used for ceremonies, conferences and other meetings.

Military offices
Preceded by MG Kenneth F. Cramer	Chief of the National Guard Bureau; 1950 - 1953	Succeeded by MG Earl T. Ricks
