= Joseph A. Redding =

Army National Guard officer (1894–1984)

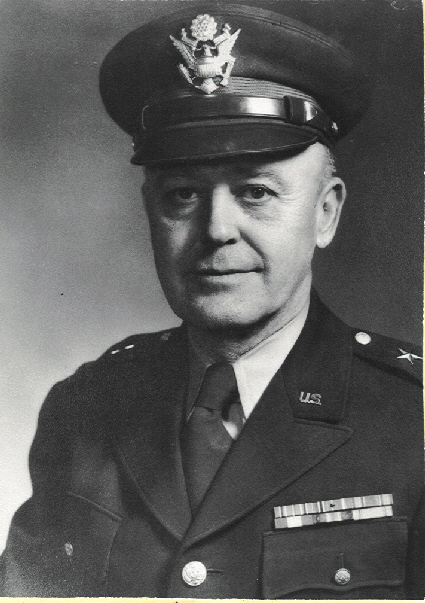
- Redding in uniform, c. 1952
- Born: June 7, 1894; Yazoo City, Mississippi
- Died: February 24, 1984 (aged 89); Baton Rouge, Louisiana
- Burial place: Forest Park East Cemetery, Shreveport, Louisiana
- Military career
- Allegiance: United States of America
- Branch: United States Army
- Service years: 1912 - 1956
- Rank: Major General
- Unit: Louisiana Army National Guard
- Commands: 204th Coastal Artillery Regiment; 199th Infantry Regiment; 39th Infantry Division
- Conflicts: Pancho Villa Expedition; World War I World War II
- Awards: Purple Heart
- Other work: Owner, Redding Tire; Owner, tax consulting office

Joseph Alsop Redding (June 7, 1894 – February 24, 1984) was a United States Army Major General who served as commander of the Army National Guard's 39th Infantry Division.

== Early life ==
Redding was born in Yazoo City, Mississippi on June 7, 1894, and his family relocated to Shreveport, Louisiana in 1910. Redding attended Louisiana State University from 1910 to 1912, and was a member of the Sigma Alpha Epsilon fraternity.

== Start of military career ==
Redding joined Company L, 1st Louisiana Infantry Regiment in 1912, and advanced through the ranks to Sergeant before obtaining his commission as a second lieutenant in 1916. Redding served on the Mexican border with the 1st Louisiana Infantry during the Pancho Villa Expedition in 1916.

== Business career ==
Redding became owner and operator of Redding Tire Service, a wholesale and retail automobile and truck tire business in Shreveport.

== World War I ==
Promoted to first lieutenant in 1917, Redding was with the 1st Louisiana Infantry when the regiment was federalized and renamed the 156th Infantry Regiment. He served at Camp Nicholls, Camp Beauregard and in France, including assignments as Adjutant of the regiment's 1st Battalion, Commander of the regiment's Headquarters and Headquarters Company, and regimental Adjutant.

During the war Germans attacked Redding's unit with gas, and he received wounds that resulted in award of the Purple Heart. Redding was a captain when he was discharged at the end of the war.

== Post World War I ==
Redding maintained his commission as a member of the organized reserve, and in 1922 returned to the Louisiana National Guard as a captain and Commander of Company H, 156th Infantry Regiment.

== World War II ==
At the start of World War II, Redding was commander of the 204th Coastal Artillery Regiment (Antiaircraft), stationed in San Diego, California.

He later served in Europe on the staff of Staff of the IX Air Defense Command, a unit of the Ninth Air Force. He was Commander of the Bad Neustadt area during the post-war occupation of Germany.

== Post World War II ==
In 1946 Redding was appointed Commander of the Louisiana National Guard's 199th Infantry Regiment.

He later served as Assistant Division Commander of the 39th Infantry Division, receiving promotion to brigadier general.

In 1951 Redding was appointed Commander of the 39th Infantry Division and promoted to Major General. He served until his retirement in 1956.

In 1952 he sold his tire business and moved to Baton Rouge, where he operated a tax consulting office.

== Death and burial ==
Redding died in Baton Rouge on February 24, 1984. His wife Mary Byrd Redding and he are buried at Forest Park East Cemetery in Shreveport.
