= 154th Regiment (United States) =

154th Regiment (Regional Training Institute)
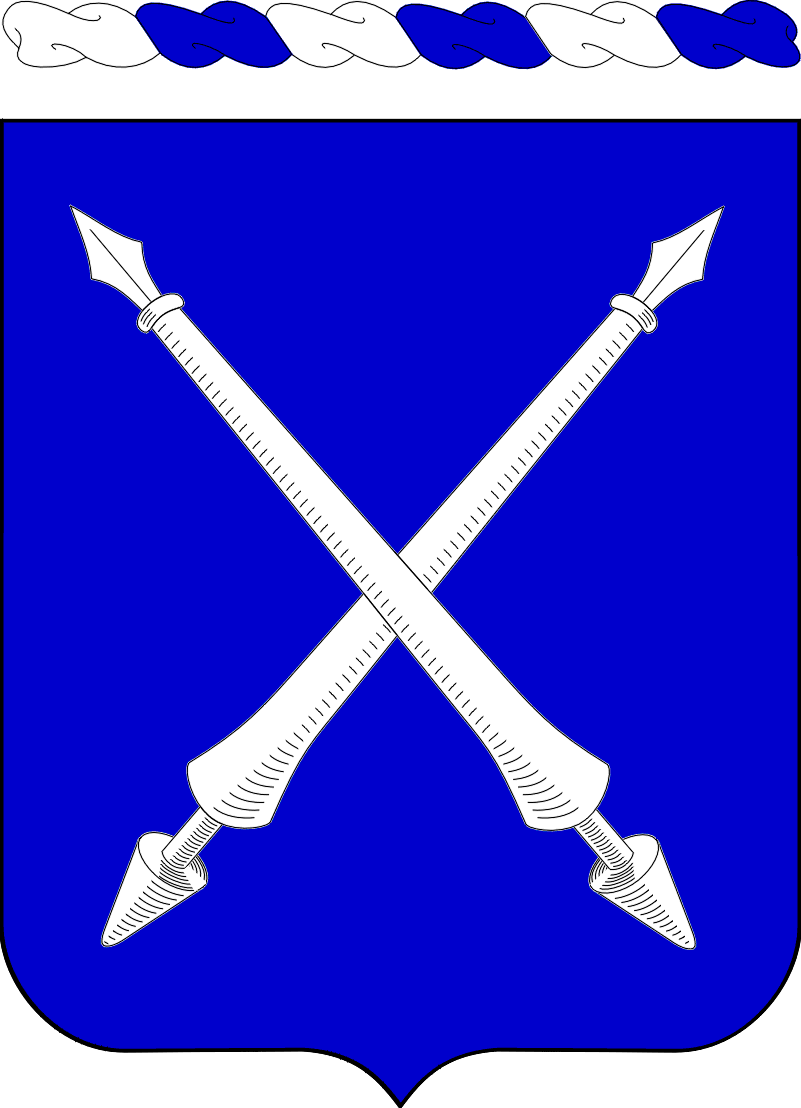
- Regimental Coat of Arms
- Active: 1917–1919; 1921-1924; 1989-
- Country: United States
- Branch: Mississippi Army National Guard; Formerly Arkansas Army National Guard
- Type: Infantry / Training
- Nickname: Third Arkansas
- Motto: "Firm To My Trust"
- Engagements: World War I *Streamer without Inscription

The 154th Regiment (Regional Training Institute) ("Third Arkansas") is a training regiment/institute of the Army National Guard. Most of its history before the 1990s can be traced to the 154th Infantry Regiment which was created from the 1st and 2nd Battalions of the 3rd Arkansas Infantry Regiment, Arkansas National Guard, in 1917. The Regiment was activated as for World War I, re-designated as the 154th Infantry and shipped to France as a part of the 39th Infantry Division, but became a replacement regiment and its personnel were reassigned to other American Expeditionary Force (AEF) units.

The 154th Infantry Regiment was never reactivated in the Arkansas National Guard following World War I. However, by 1999, it had been reformed as a Regiment (Regional Training Institute) of the Mississippi Army National Guard.

== History ==
=== Activation of the 3rd Arkansas Infantry Regiment ===
The United States declared war on Germany 6 April 1917 less than two months after the last Arkansas National Guard units completed mustering out from duty on the Mexican border. At this time the Arkansas Guard consisted of two infantry regiments, the 1st and 2nd Arkansas, which had each been mobilized for service on the Mexican border. The National Defense Act of 1916 had provided for a massive expansion of the National Guard, from a force of just over 100,000 to over 400,000.

While a 3rd Arkansas Infantry had existed in the Arkansas State Guard prior to the Spanish–American War, the unit had been deactivated and never reorganized following the war with Spain. On 17 April 1917, plans for the 3rd Arkansas Regiment were formulated: new units were to be raised in sixteen cities to support the new Regiment. On 16 May 1917, it was announced that Little Rock was one of the cities to be allowed a new infantry company which would be part of the 3rd Arkansas Regiment. Enlistments were to be for the duration of the war. The pay per month for the enlisted men was as follows:

Rank	Pay
Sergeants, First Class	$45
Sergeants	$36
Privates, First Class	$18
Privates	$15
Cooks	$30

To qualify for a commission in the guard, an individual had to be a former officer or private of the guard, officer on reserve or unassigned list, active or retired officer of the regular army, navy or marine corps; graduate of the United States military or naval academy's or graduate of a school, college or university where military science under a regular army officer was taught.

The age limits that were established for officers of the new units were these:

Rank	Age Requirements
Colonel	21 to 65 years
Lieutenant Colonel	21 to 50 years
Majors	21 to 45 years
Captain	21 to 40 years
First Lieutenant	21 to 30 years.

Recruitment for men in Little Rock was carried out by seventeen girls wearing badges bearing the words, "If You Are A Real Man Enlist." The girls distributed buttonhole tags with, "Are You A Slacker?" The other side of the tag read, "Are You A Man?" The girls worked until 5 June 1917, when the draft law became effective.

=== Mobilization ===
On 18 May 1917, the Arkansas National Guard was notified that on 5 August 1917, the guard as a whole would be called into Federal service. On 16 July 1917, the 3rd Arkansas included the following units:

Regiment	Unit	Station	Officers	Enlisted
3rd Regiment	Company A	Augusta	3	150
	Company B	Little Rock	3	150
	Company C	Hot Springs and Camden	3	160
	Company D	Morrilton	3	150
	Company E	Newport	3	150
	Company F	Batesville	3	160
	Company G	Walnut Ridge	3	160
	Company H	Paragould	3	160
	Company I	Ashdown and Nashville	3	150
	Company K	Magnolia	3	150
	Company L	Fordyce	3	150
	Company M	Clarksville	3	150
	Headquarters Company	Little Rock	2	97
	Supply Company	Little Rock	2	37
	Machine Gun Company	Helena	4	74
	Medical Corps	Eureka Springs	4	33

On 18 July 1917, it was announced that Arkansas National Guard would move to Alexandria, Louisiana, for training as part of the Eighteenth Division. Alexandria, Louisiana, was the location of Camp Beauregard which was named after General P. G. T. Beauregard, C.S.A.

The 3rd Arkansas Infantry Regiment mobilized 5 August and was encamped around the new state capitol by 8 August. The 2nd and 3rd Infantry Regiments were examined for Federal service on 6 August 1917, at Ft. Brough (located on the Capital grounds). The regiments, under the control of General Wood, were sent to Ft. Roots and moved to Camp Pike by 24 August 1917. The Commander of the supply company of the 3rd Arkansas received instructions from the Augusta Arsenal to go into the open market and buy mess kits to complete the equipment needed for the new regiments. In mid-September the Arkansas units were notified that they were to be part of a newly created division, initially called the 18th but later re-designated as the 39th Division.

The 3rd Arkansas Regiment used sixty coaches, three standard pullmans, six baggage cars, twelve boxcars, and one stock car, and set off on a train journey to Camp Beauregard, Louisiana, lasting about fourteen hours; they mustered into Federal service 27 September – 18 October 1917.

=== Creation of the 154th Infantry Regiment ===
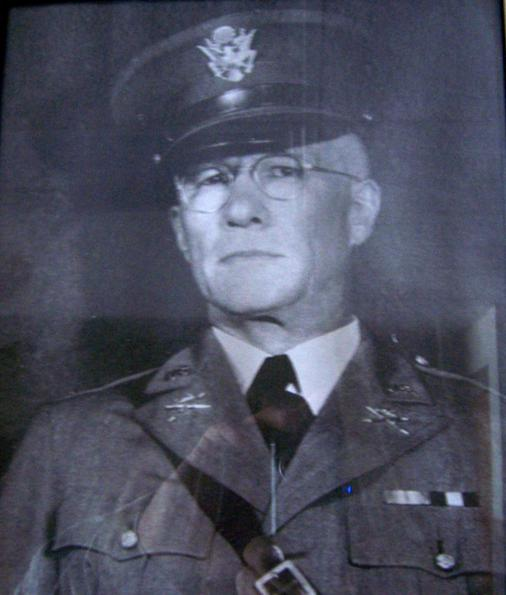
COL Ebenezer L. Compere, 1917–1919

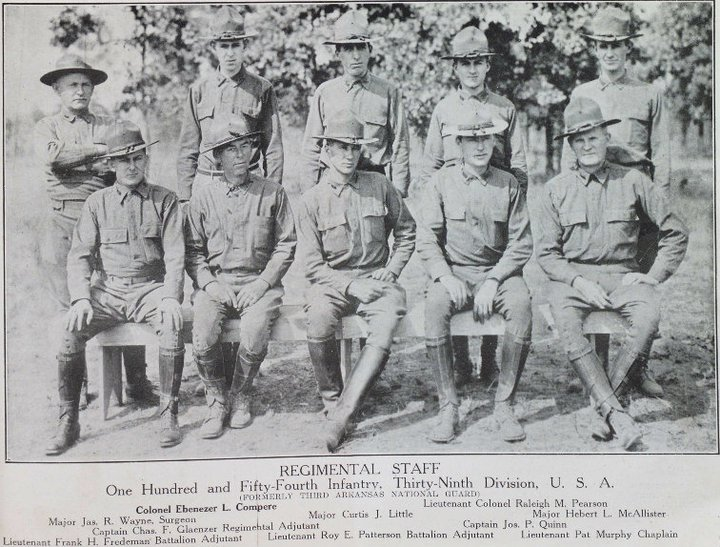

Once the Arkansas regiments arrived at Camp Beauregard, they were re-organized under a new national system for numbering army regiments. The 1st Arkansas Infantry became the 153rd Infantry Regiment, the 2nd Regiment (minus its Machine Gun Company) became the 142nd Field Artillery Regiment. The 3rd Arkansas Infantry, which had reported to Camp Beauregard with over 1800 Soldiers, was divided into two new units. The 1st and 2nd Battalions of the 3rd Arkansas Infantry Regiment were re-designated as the 154th Infantry. The former 3rd Battalion, 3rd Arkansas Infantry Regiment and the Machine Gun Company from the 2nd Arkansas Infantry were re-designated as the 141st Machine Gun Battalion.

The 18th Infantry Division was re-designated as the 39th "Delta" Division, U.S.N.G., and the Arkansas units were assigned to the 77th Infantry Brigade (153rd Infantry, 154th Infantry, and the 141st Machine Gun Battalion).

=== Deployed to France ===
In May 1918, privates were given the opportunity to volunteer for duty overseas. In the rush to help end the war officers resigned their commissions so they would be qualified for duty overseas before the war was over. As a result, the first Arkansas National Guard Soldier to die in combat during World War I was Private Robert Springer of Company C 313th Labor Battalion on 19 May 1918, a former member of the 3rd Arkansas.

June 1918, marked the arrival in France of 20 per cent of the enlisted personnel of the 154th Infantry, and the 141st Machine Gun Battalion, U.S.N.G. The movement consisted of only 20 per cent of each organization, and the officers did not accompany their troops but remained at Camp Beauregard with the other 80 per cent still in training.

The first unit of the 39th Division arrived in France on 12 August 1918, and the last unit arrived on 12 September 1918. The Division was then sent to the St. Florent area, southwest of Bourges, where it was designated as a replacement division. In November 1918, it moved to St. Aignan. There several of the units were transferred to combat divisions. The 141st Machine Gun Battalion was deployed to near Chaumont, Department of Haute-Marne, France. Soon after reaching its billets an order was received from G. H. Q. designating this unit as the 141st Anti-aircraft Machine Gun Battalion and ordering it to proceed to Langres, France for training. The organization finished the war at Noigent waiting for transportation. Letters from a soldier of the 3rd Arkansas were received in Arkansas.

The unit returned to the United States and was discharged in 1919. It was demobilized 13 January 1919 at Camp Beauregard, Louisiana.

== Since 1919 ==
In the post-World War I reorganization of the National Guard, the 154th Infantry Regiment was constituted in the National Guard in 1921, assigned to the 39th Division, and allotted to the state of Florida. The regiment was organized on 19 December 1921 by the redesignation of the 1st Infantry Regiment, Florida National Guard (organized 4 June 1921). The 1st and 2nd Battalions were called up to conduct riot control during a railroad workers' strike from 7-16 August 1922. On 1 July 1923, the 39th Division was redesignated the 31st Division, and the 154th Infantry was concurrently relieved from assignment to the 39th Division and assigned to the 31st Division. On 28 May 1924, the 154th Infantry Regiment was redesignated the 124th Infantry Regiment.

The 124th and 156th Infantry Regiments were relieved from the 31st Division on 15 December 1941 and 15 July 1942, respectively, to perform other duties, and the division was without a third infantry regiment until 20 September 1942, when the 154th Infantry Regiment was activated in the Army of the United States and assigned to the division. The 124th Infantry was inactivated on 2 March 1944 at Fort Jackson, South Carolina. The Governor of Florida, Spessard Holland, appealed to the Secretary of War, Henry Stimson, that the 124th Infantry be kept in service, and 5 April 1944, the 154th Infantry Regiment was disbanded, with the personnel and equipment used to fill the reactivated 124th Infantry Regiment, which was assigned to the 31st Division.

By 1999, the lineage of the 154th Infantry had been taken up in the neighboring Mississippi Army National Guard as the state's Regional Training Institute, and it remains active in that form.

== Campaign participation credit ==
=== World War I ===
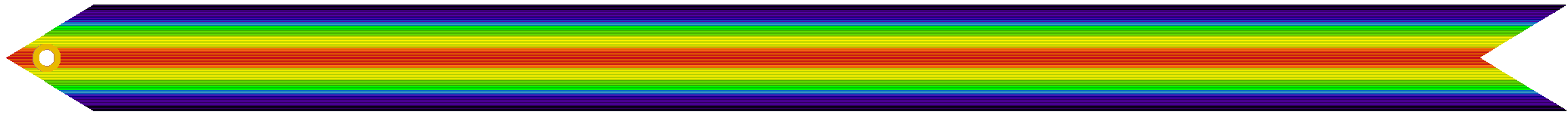
