= 156th Infantry Regiment (United States) =

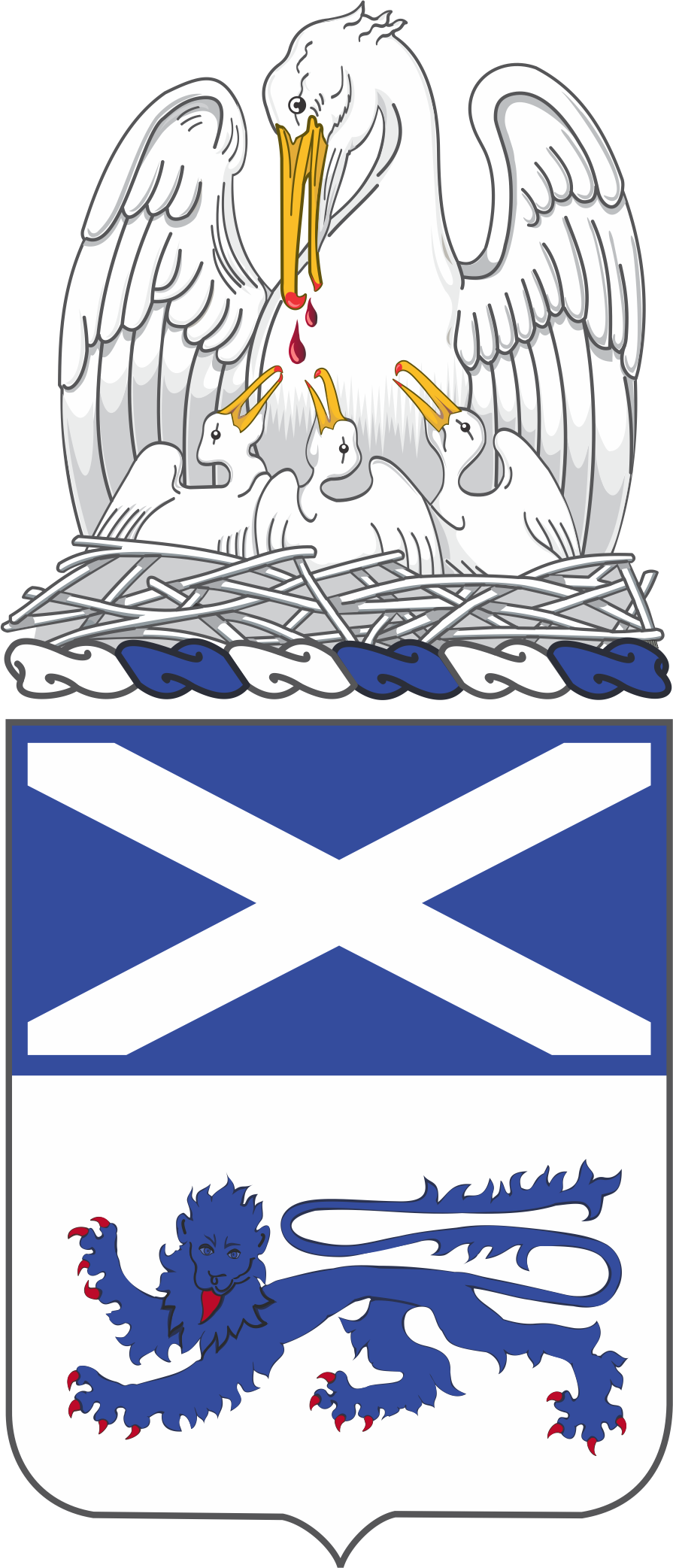
- Coat of Arms
- Active: 1861-65; 1878-present
- Country: United States
- Allegiance: Louisiana
- Branch: United States Army
- Type: Infantry
- Nickname: First Louisiana (Special Designation)
- Mottos: Dieu Et Moi; God and Me
- Engagements: American Civil War {CS} World War II; Iraq Campaign

Insignia
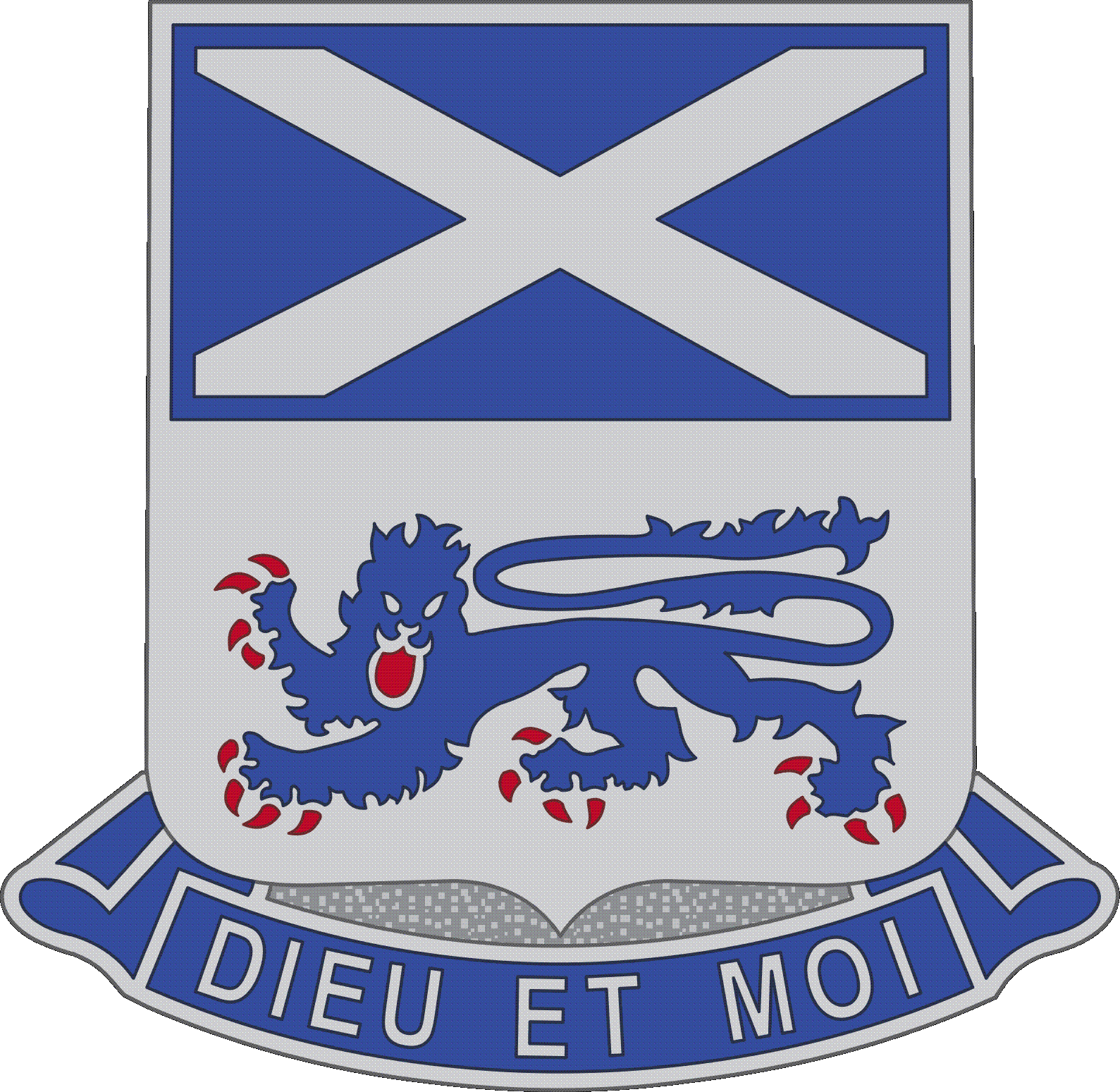
- Distinctive unit insignia

The 156th Infantry Regiment ("First Louisiana") is an infantry regiment in the United States Army and the Louisiana National Guard. It began as a Confederate Army unit in 1861, and surrendered to the Union at the Battle of Appomattox Court House in 1865. It was reformed in 1878 as a militia unit, and reorganized into the Louisiana National Guard in 1899. It saw support service in World War I. In World War II, it served as a rear-area guard unit in Europe, for which it added a lion to its coat of arms to symbolize its service in northern France. It deployed to the Middle East twice during the Iraq War.

== History ==
The 2nd Battalion, 156th Infantry Regiment was originally organized between 9 and 17 May 1861 as the 2nd and 3rd Louisiana Volunteer Infantry Regiments and mustered into Confederate service at New Orleans. The 2nd Louisiana Volunteer Infantry Regiment surrendered on 9 April 1865 at Appomattox, VA, with the Army of Northern Virginia; the 3d Louisiana Volunteer Infantry Regiment disbanded on 20 May 1865 at Shreveport, LA.

The 2nd and 3rd Louisiana Volunteer Infantry Regiments reconstituted on 30 March 1878 as the Special Militia Force to include separate companies and battalions outside Orleans Parish; its elements organized between 1878 and 1890 embracing fifteen companies by 1890. They were reorganized in part on 26 December 1891 as the 1st and 2nd Battalions of Infantry and transferred to the Louisiana State National Guard. The battalions consolidated on 17 March 1896 to form the 1st Regiment of Infantry with headquarters at Baton Rouge.

The unit was mustered into federal service between 8–18 May 1898 at New Orleans as the 1st Louisiana Volunteer Infantry and mustered out of federal service on 3 October 1898 at Jacksonville, FL. It was reorganized on 8 August 1899 in the Louisiana State National Guard as the 1st Battalion of Infantry with headquarters at Monroe. It was expanded, reorganized, and redesignated on 6 December 1904 as the 1st Regiment of Infantry with headquarters at Monroe. The Louisiana State National Guard was meanwhile redesignated in 1910 as the Louisiana National Guard.

=== World War I ===
The 1st Louisiana Infantry was drafted into federal service on 5 August 1917 and assigned to the 39th Division. The Headquarters Company, Supply Company, Machine Gun Company, and Companies A, B, C, D, E and F were used to form the 156th Infantry Regiment. Two-thirds of the enlisted men from Companies G, I, and M were assigned as part of the 154th Infantry Regiment, while one-third were assigned to the 114th Engineer Regiment. Companies H and L were assigned as part of the 114th Machine Gun Battalion. Half of the enlisted men from Company K were assigned to the 114th Field Signal Battalion, while the other half were assigned to the 114th Train Headquarters and Military Police. The 39th Division was redesignated the 5th Depot Division on 14 August 1918, and was used to receive, orient, and forward replacements to combat units for the remainder of the war.

=== Interwar period ===
The 156th Infantry arrived at the port of Newport News, Virginia, on 31 December 1918 on the USS Princess Matoika, and was demobilized on 23 January 1919 at Camp Beauregard, Louisiana. Per the terms of the National Defense Act of 1920, the 156th Infantry was reconstituted in the National Guard in 1921, assigned to the 39th Division, and allotted to the state of Louisiana. It was initially reorganized in June 1921 as seven separate companies of infantry, and reorganized, expanded, and redesignated on 2 November 1921 as the 156th Infantry. The regimental headquarters was organized on 4 August 1922 and federally recognized at New Orleans, Louisiana. It was successively relocated as follows: to Lafayette, Louisiana, 22 July 1929; and Shreveport, Louisiana, 25 February 1937. The 156th Infantry was relieved from the 39th Division on 1 July 1923 and assigned to the 31st Division. The regiment, or elements thereof, was called up to perform the following state duties: six companies performed flood relief duty at communities flooded by the Mississippi River, 24 April–7 June 1922; regiment performed flood relief duty at communities flooded by the Mississippi River, 26 April–19 June 1927. It conducted annual summer training most years at Camp Beauregard, Louisiana, from 1922–39. The 2nd Battalion was relieved and reorganized as the 2nd Battalion, 204th Coast Artillery Regiment in February 1940, and concurrently, a new 2nd Battalion was organized. The regimental headquarters was relocated about March 1940 to Lake Charles, Louisiana. The 156th Infantry was inducted into active federal service at New Orleans on 20 November 1940, and moved to Camp Blanding, Florida, where it arrived on 21 December 1940.

=== World War II ===
After American entry into World War II, the 156th Infantry moved from Camp Blanding to Camp Bowie, near Brownwood, Texas, on 26 February 1942 where it was relieved from assignment to the 31st Infantry Division on 14 July 1942. The 156th arrived in England on 6 October 1942 and the 2nd Battalion, because of the French language abilities of many of its members, was sent to Algeria for military police duties and was redesignated the 202nd Infantry Battalion on 1 September 1943, inactivating on 25 February 1944. The personnel of the 202nd Infantry Battalion were then assigned to the 66th through 74th Military Police Companies (constituted 12 February 1944 in the Army of the United States and activated on 25 February 1944). The regiment was subsequently assigned to the U.S. Army Assault Training Center at Woolacombe, England, and a new 2nd Battalion was activated by shipping the 3rd Battalion, 131st Infantry Regiment to England from Fort Brady, Michigan. The 156th went ashore in France in June 1944 and acted as a separate infantry regiment, performing guard duties at headquarters, POW camps (like CCPWE26 in Belgium) or supply installations, and containing German troops bypassed by allied forces in France. The regiment returned to the United States and was inactivated on 13 March 1946 at Camp Kilmer, New Jersey.

=== Cold War to present ===
The 156th Infantry was assigned on 28 May 1946 to the 39th Infantry Division, and was reorganized and federally recognized on 18 December 1946 with headquarters at Lafayette. The 156th Infantry and the 199th Infantry (less 3rd Battalion) were consolidated on 1 July 1959 and reorganized as the 156th Infantry, a parent regiment under the U.S. Army Combat Arms Regimental System, to consist of the 1st, 2nd, and 3rd Battle Groups, elements of the 39th Infantry Division. The 3d Battalion, 199th Infantry, was concurrently converted and redesignated as the 539th Transportation Battalion – hereafter separate lineage.

The 156th Infantry was reorganized on 1 May 1963 to consist of the 1st, 2nd, 3rd, and 4th Battalions, elements of the 39th Infantry Division. It reorganized on 1 December 1967 to consist of the 1st, 2nd, and 3rd Battalions, elements of the 256th Infantry Brigade; on 1 March 1977 to consist of the 2nd and 3rd Battalions, elements of the 256th Infantry Brigade; on 1 July 1991 to consist of the 2nd and 3rd Battalions, elements of the 256th Infantry Brigade, and the 4th Battalion; and on 1 February 1993 to consist of the 2nd and 3rd Battalions, elements of the 256th Infantry Brigade. As part of the 256th IBCT, the unit deployed twice to Iraq, in 2004-5 and again in 2010.

== Organization ==
=== 1st Battalion ===
Disbanded and removed from service following re-organization of the regiment on 1 March 1977.

=== 2nd Battalion ===
The 2nd Battalion, 156th Infantry is headquartered in Abbeville, Louisiana in Vermilion Parish. It consists of the following:

Headquarters and Headquarters Company (HHC) located in Abbeville, LA with a detachment in Jeanerette, LA.

Alpha Company (Rifle) located in Breaux Bridge, LA with a detachment in Plaquemine, LA.

Bravo Company (Rifle) located in New Iberia, LA with a detachment in Franklin, LA.

Charlie Company (Rifle) located in Houma, LA.

Delta Company (Weapons) located in Thibodaux, LA.

Golf Company (FSC attached from 199th BSB) located in Jeanerette, LA with a detachment in Abbeville, LA

=== 3rd Battalion ===
The 3rd Battalion, 156th Infantry is headquartered in Lake Charles, Louisiana. It consists of the following:

Headquarters and Headquarters Company (HHC) located in Lake Charles, LA with a detachment in DeQuincy, LA

Alpha Company (Rifle) located in Fort Johnson, LA with a detachment in DeRidder, LA

Bravo Company (Rifle) located in Pineville, LA (Camp Beauregard) with a detachment in Baton Rouge, LA

Charlie Company (Rifle) located in Crowley, LA with a detachment in New Orleans, LA

Delta Company (Weapons) located in Opelousas, LA

Hotel Company (FSC attached from 199th BSB) located in DeQuincy, LA

=== 4th Battalion ===
Disbanded and removed from service following re-organization of the regiment on 1 December 1967.

== Distinctive unit insignia ==
- Description

A Silver color metal and enamel device 1 1/8 inches (2.86 cm) in height overall consisting of a shield blazoned: Per fess enhanced Azure and Argent in chief a saltire couped of the second and in base a leopard passant guardant of the first armed and langued Gules. Attached below and to the sides of the shield a Blue scroll inscribed "DIEU ET MOI" in Silver letters.

- Symbolism

The shield is in the colors of the Infantry. The organization's honorable Civil War service is shown by the saltire, (St. Andrews cross), taken from the Confederate battle flag. The leopard is taken from the arms of Normandy and symbolized the campaigns fought in Northern France. The motto translates to "God and I."

- Background

The distinctive unit insignia was approved on 12 October 1951.

== Coat of arms ==
- Blazon
  - Shield- Per fess enhanced Azure and Argent in chief a saltire couped of the second and in base a leopard passant guardant of the first armed and langued Gules.
  - Crest- That for the regiments and separate battalions of the Louisiana Army National Guard: On a wreath of the colors Argent and Azure, a pelican in her piety affronté with three young in nest, Argent, armed and vulned Proper. Motto: DIEU ET MOI (God and I).
- Symbolism
  - Shield- The shield is in the colors of the Infantry. The organization's honorable Civil War service is shown by the saltire, (St. Andrews cross), taken from the Confederate battle flag. The leopard is taken from the arms of Normandy and symbolized the campaigns fought in Northern France.
  - Crest- The crest is that of the Louisiana Army National Guard.
- Background- The coat of arms was approved on 12 October 1951.
