= 141st Field Artillery Regiment =

United States Army unit

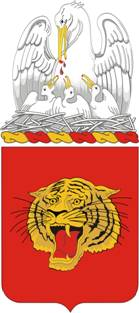
- Coat of arms
- Active: 1838–present
- Country: United States
- Allegiance: United States (1838-1861; 1865-present); Confederate States (1861–1865)
- Branch: Louisiana Army National Guard
- Nickname: Washington Artillery (special designation)
- Motto: "Try Us!"
- Mascot: Tiger
- Engagements: Mexican–American War; US Civil War{CSA} Spanish–American War; Mexican Expedition; World War II; Operation Iraqi Freedom; Operation Inherent Resolve

Commanders
- Current commander: LTC Michael B. Lacoste

Insignia
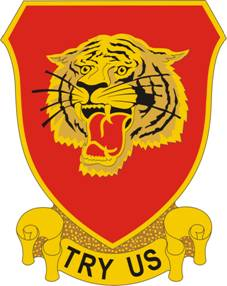
- Distinctive unit insignia

The 141st Field Artillery Regiment (Washington Artillery) is a United States field artillery regiment.

== History ==
The 141st Field Artillery is currently part of the Louisiana Army National Guard headquartered in New Orleans, Louisiana. It traces its lineage to a militia artillery battery back to 1838, and its heritage includes substantial combat service in several major wars. It earned the Presidential Unit Citation (US) for its service in World War II.

The Washington Artillery was founded on 7 September 1838, as the Washington Artillery Company. In 1844, locals in the community gave the company a flag described as having stripes of red, white, and blue. The motto of the company on one side with "Washington Artillery," and a palmetto on the other side. They received another regimental flag in August 1846 after serving under Zachary Taylor in the Mexican–American War.

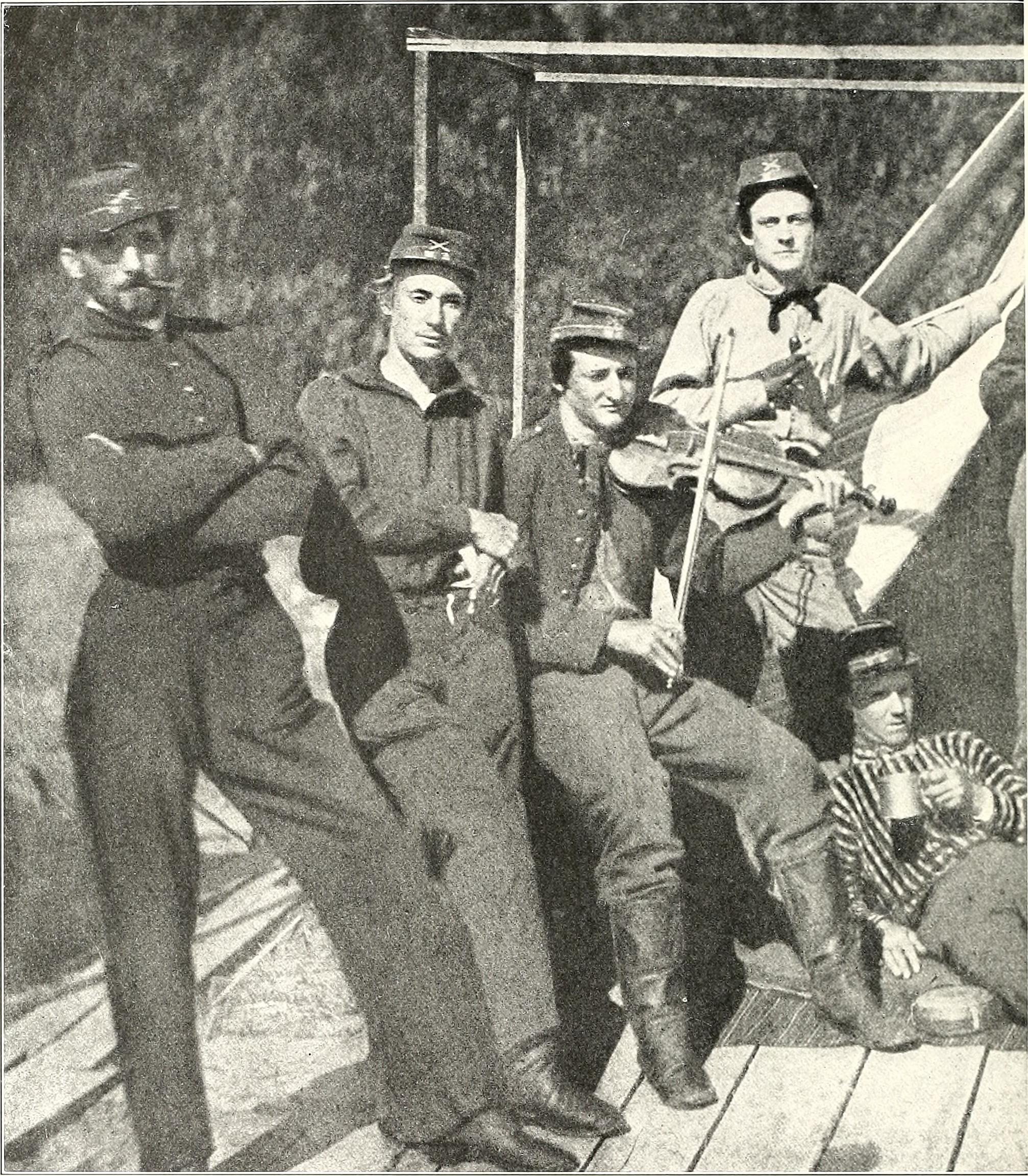
Civil War service

26 May 1861 the Unit was mustered into the American Civil War; four companies served in the Army of Northern Virginia and a fifth was in the Army of Tennessee. Elements of the Washington Artillery participated in over sixty major actions. A few notable engagements include: Battle of Antietam, Battle of Perryville, Battle of Gettysburg, Battle of Shiloh, Battle of Chickamauga, Battle of Fredericksburg, First Battle of Manassas, and the Battle of Cold Harbor.

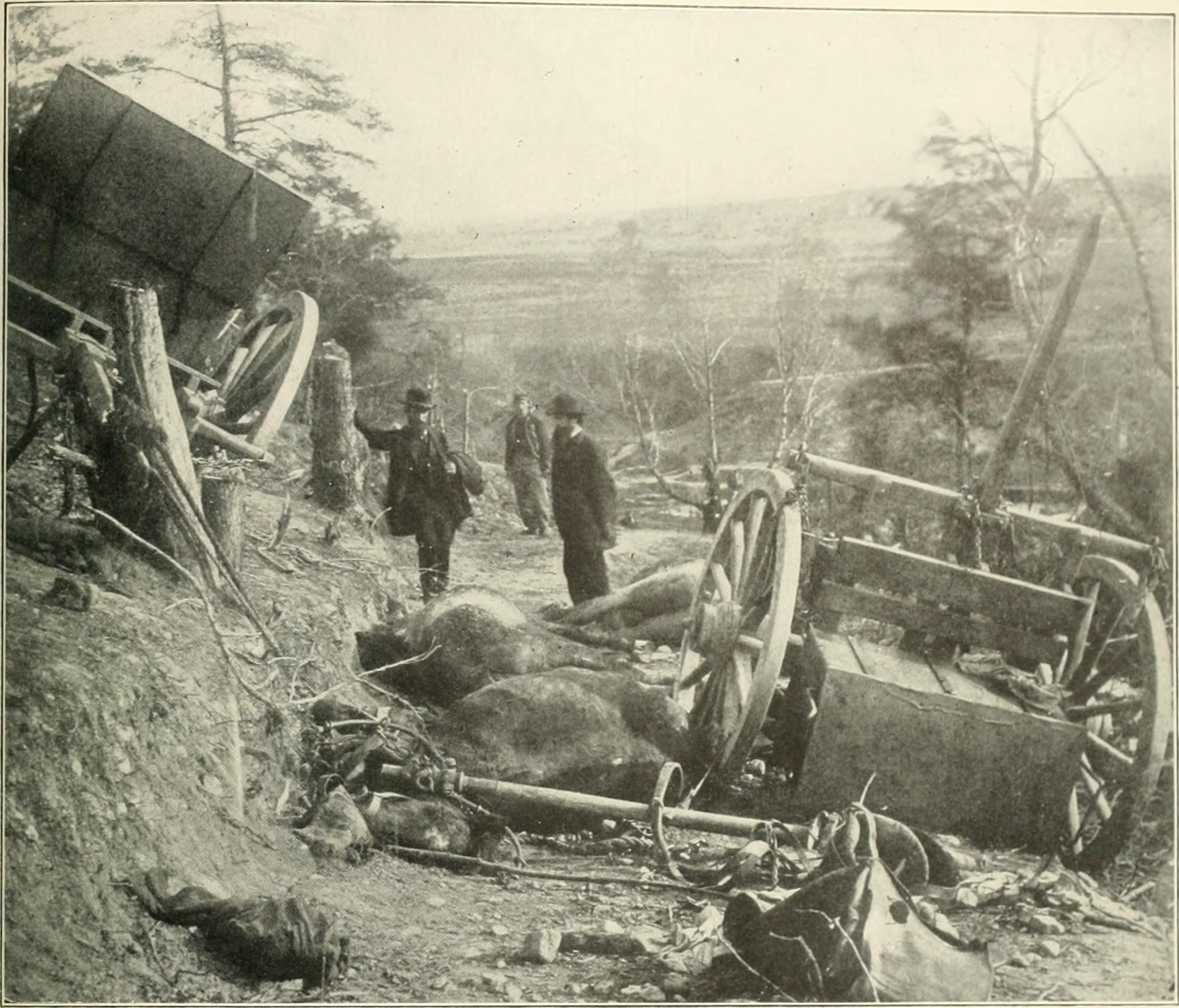
General Haupt and W. Wright, Superintendent of the Military Railroad survey a Confederate Artillery Battery caisson on Maryes Heights, Fredericksburg Va that was wrecked by Union artillery fire May 5, 1863. This was of the Washington Artillery of eight artillery pieces, with six guns surrounded under command of Capt Squires and Lt Owen.

After the Civil War, it was reorganized as an independent unit called the "Louisiana Volunteer Field Artillery" where it served the United States in the occupation of Cuba. It later was called into service to protect the Mexican border in 1916. A year later it received the designation 141st Artillery. In early 1941, the 141st Field Artillery was mobilized for World War II where it earned the Presidential Unit Citation; a duplicate unit was formed, the 935th Field Artillery Battalion, with both serving in Europe and North Africa. The anti-tank batteries of the battalion were separated in mid-1941, and formed the 773rd Tank Destroyer Battalion.

On 1 July 1959, the 141st and 935th Field Artillery Battalions were consolidated with Headquarters and Headquarters Battery, 204th Antiaircraft Artillery Group, 527th Antiaircraft Artillery Battalion, and the 219th Antiaircraft Artillery Detachment to form the 141st Artillery, a parent regiment under the Combat Arms Regimental System to consist of the 1st, 2nd, and 3rd Howitzer Battalions, elements of the 39th Infantry Division, the 4th Automatic Weapons Battalion, and the 5th Detachment. The 141st Artillery was redesignated on 1 May 1972 as the 141st Field Artillery to consist of the 1st Battalion, an element of the 256th infantry Brigade. It was withdrawn 30 June 1986 from the Combat Arms Regimental System and reorganized under the United States Army Regimental System.

In 2004 through 2005 and again in 2010, the 141st FA as part of the 256th Infantry Brigade mobilized to Baghdad, Iraq, in support of Operations Iraqi Freedom and New Dawn.

On 29 August 2005, Hurricane Katrina struck the Gulf Coast of Louisiana and Mississippi while most members of the Washington Artillery were still serving their final weeks of deployment in Iraq. Following the return of the battalion to Louisiana, a detachment immediately mobilized to New Orleans to aid law enforcement with rescue efforts. With the help of the Louisiana State Police, those efforts transitioned into a support mission for the New Orleans Police Department. Joint Task Force Gator was created to help combat the rise of looting and other crimes resulting from the loss of law enforcement officers in the New Orleans area. After three-and-a-half years of assisting local police and patrolling the city, the task force was released from duty on 28 February 2009.

From November 2020 through October 2021 the 141st FA would be deployed to Iraq and Syria as a part of the 256th Infantry Brigade in support of Operation Inherent Resolve, where they would see combat against manned and unmmaned indirect fire attacks and drone strikes. The 141st FA would conduct artillery, base defense, and operations of several outposts and bases across the area of operations.

== Regimental colors and streamers ==
Regimental colors of the Washington Artillery

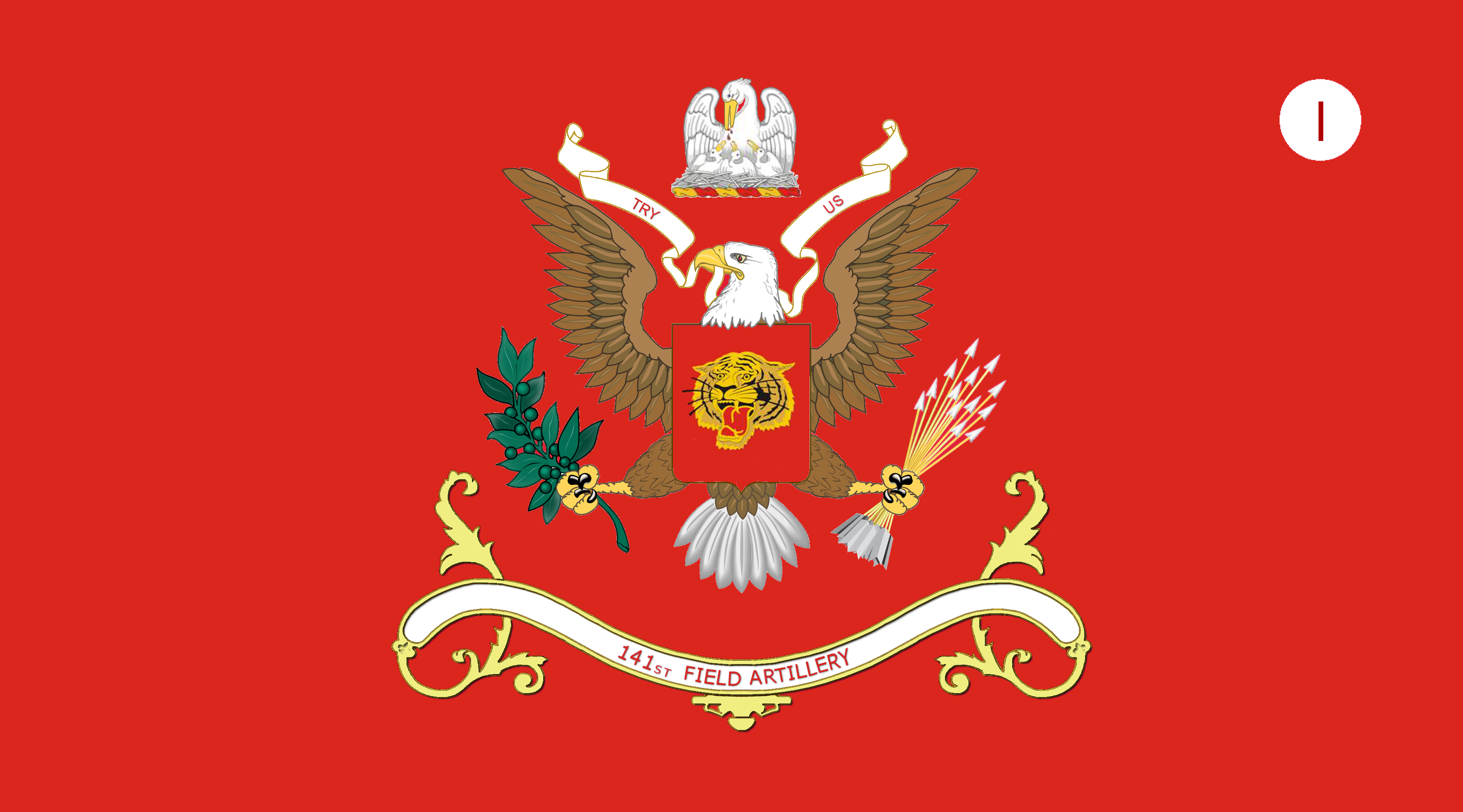

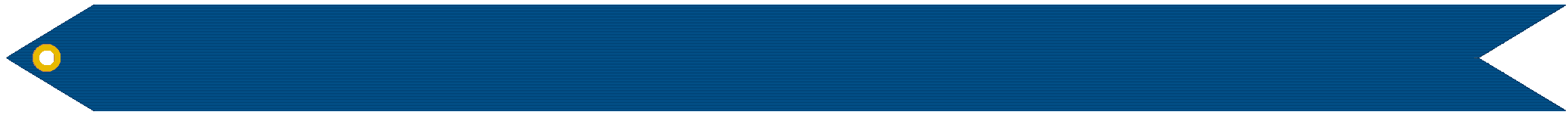
- Presidential Unit Citation
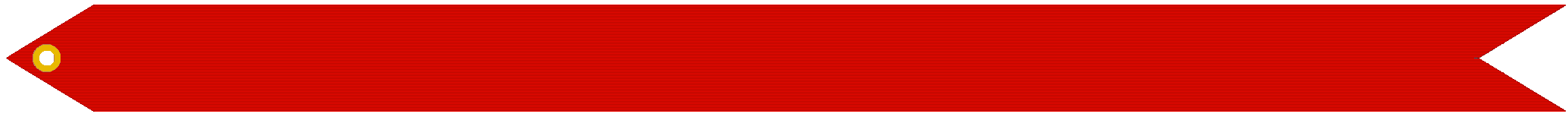
- Meritorious Unit Commendation

These are the Campaign streamers awarded to the Regiment:

Mexican–American War

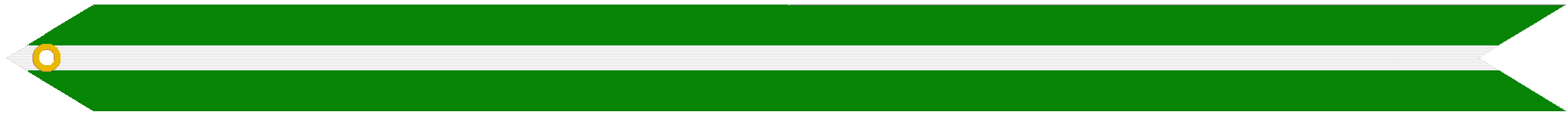
- Streamer without inscription

American Civil War

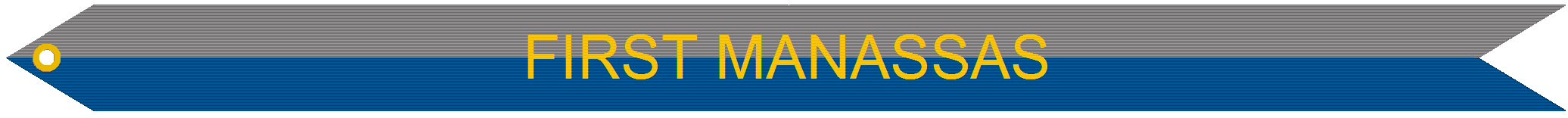
- First Manassas
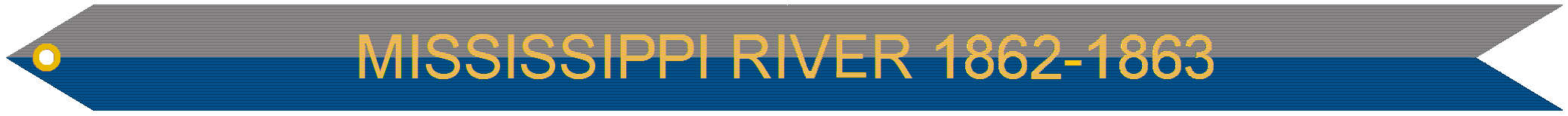
- Mississippi River
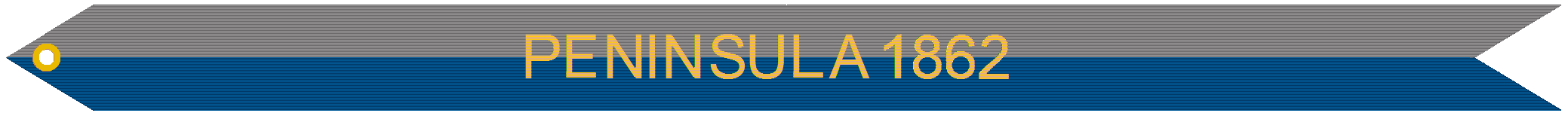
- Peninsula 1862
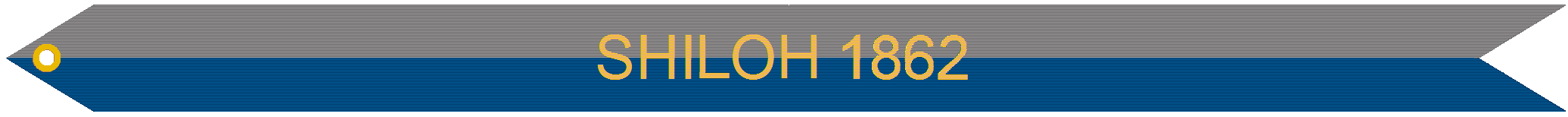
- Shiloh 1862
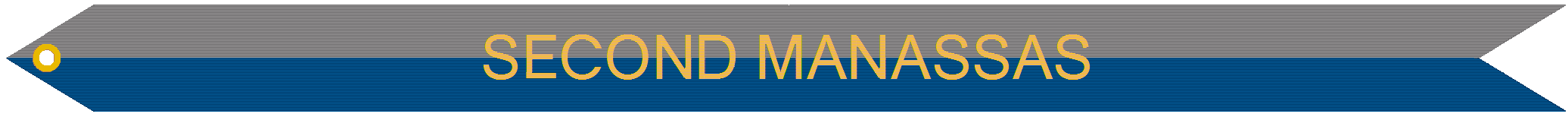
- Second Manassas
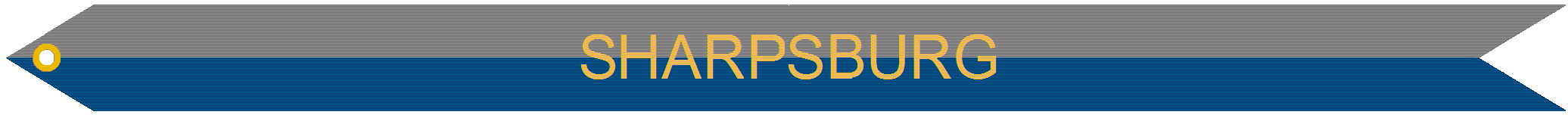
- Sharpsburg
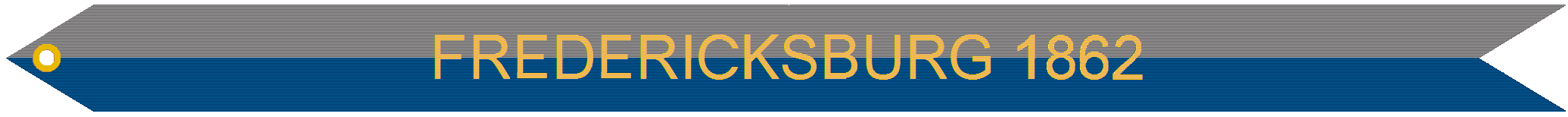
- Fredericksburg
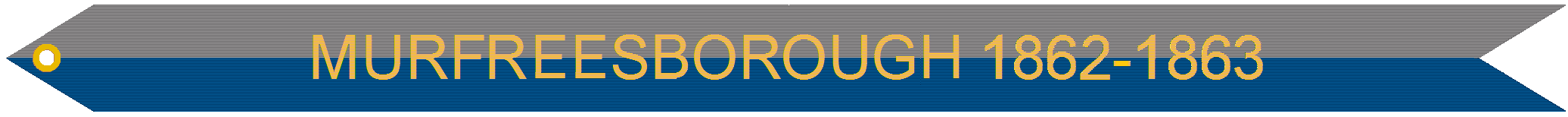
- Murfreesborough
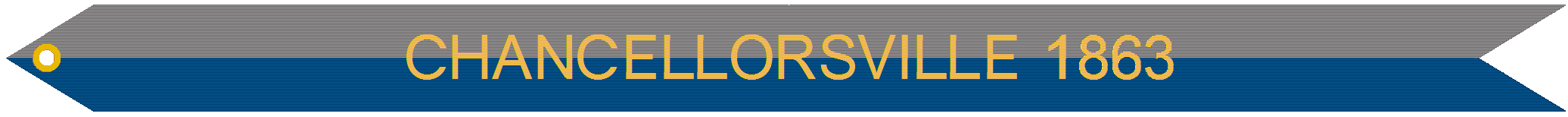
- Chancellorsville
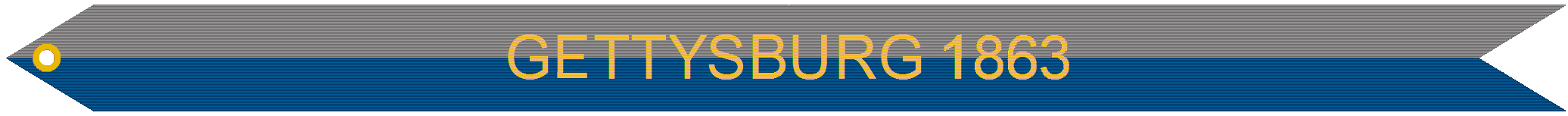
- Gettysburg
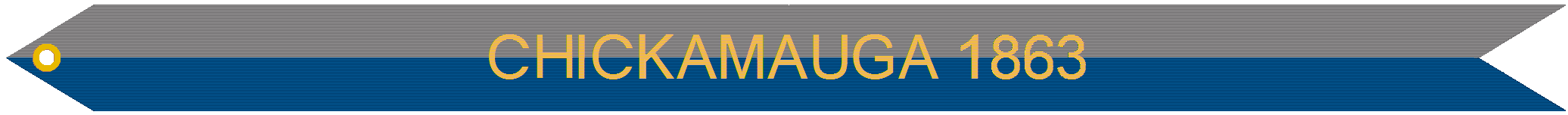
- Chickamauga
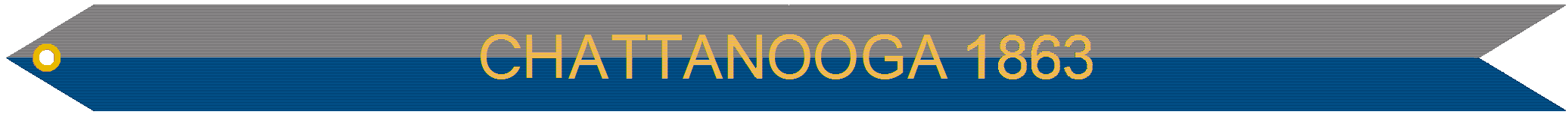
- Chattanooga
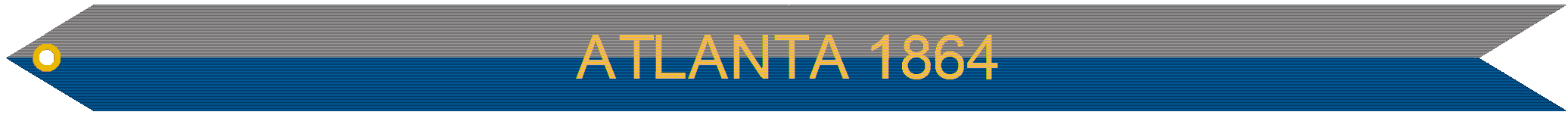
- Atlanta
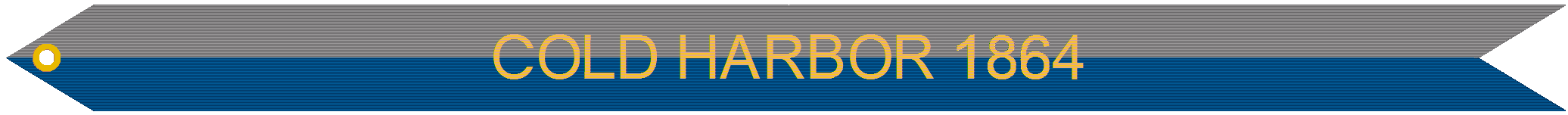
- Cold Harbor
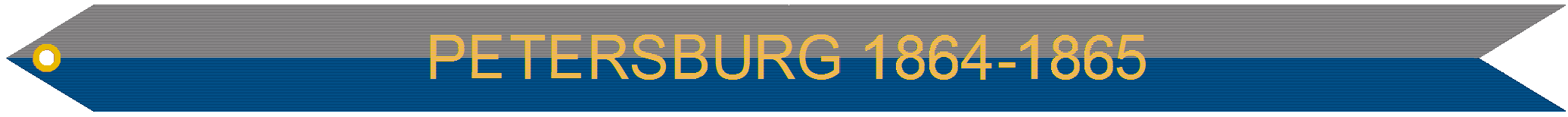
- Petersburg
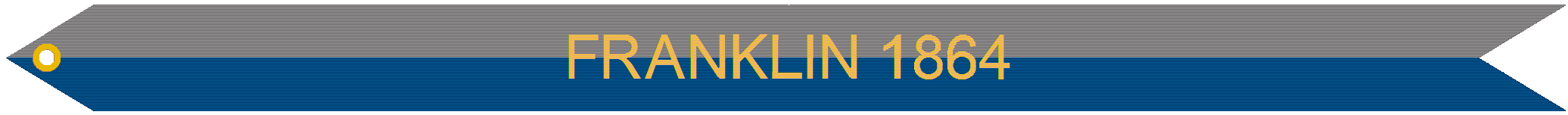
- Franklin
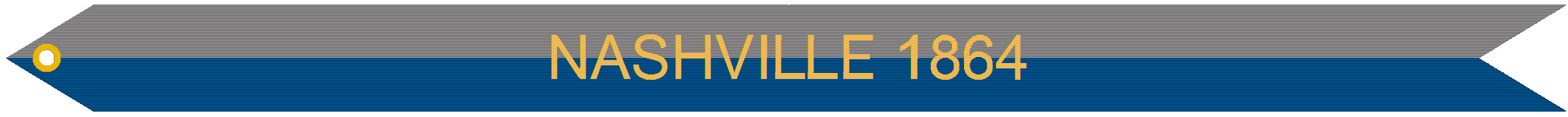
- Nashville
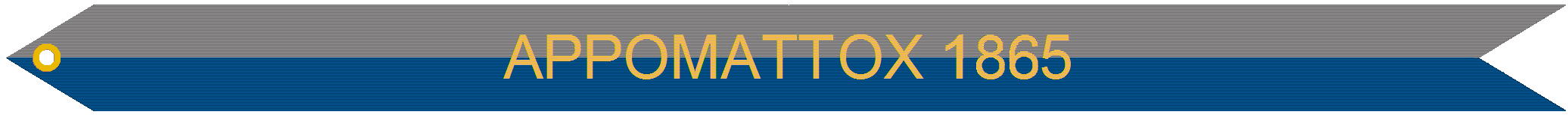
- Appomattox

World War I

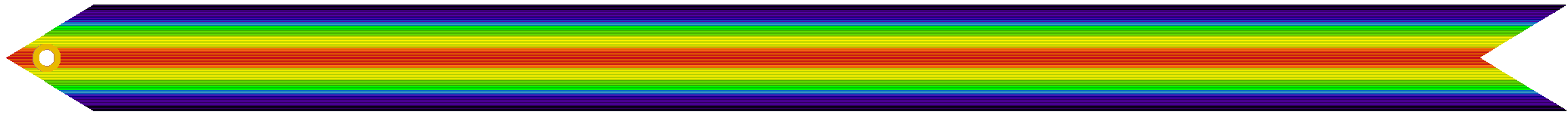
- Streamer without inscription

World War II

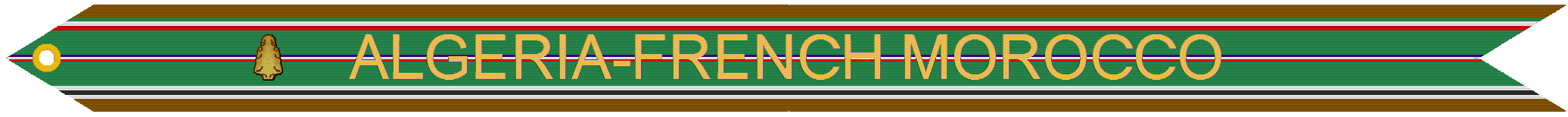
- Algeria-French Morocco
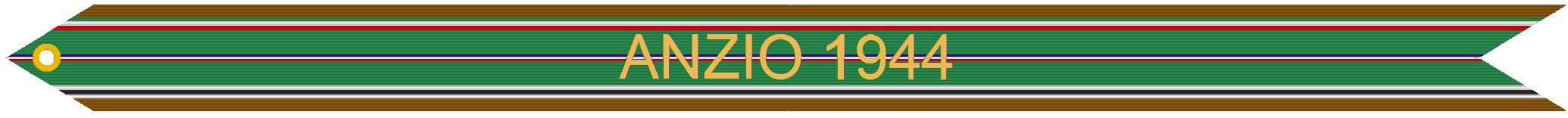
- Anzio
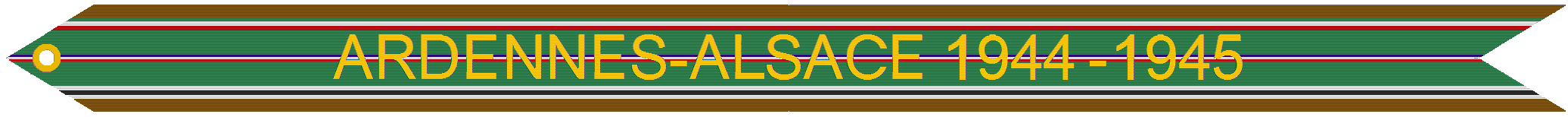
- Ardennes-Alsace
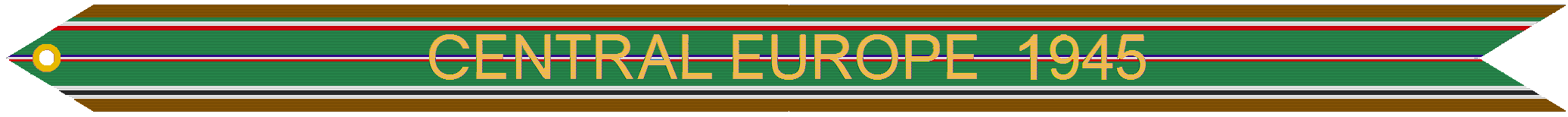
- Central Europe 1945
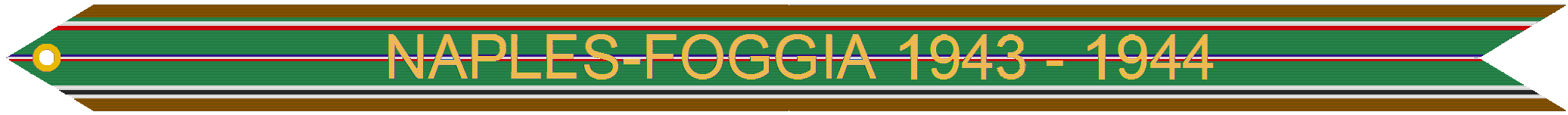
- Naples-Foggia
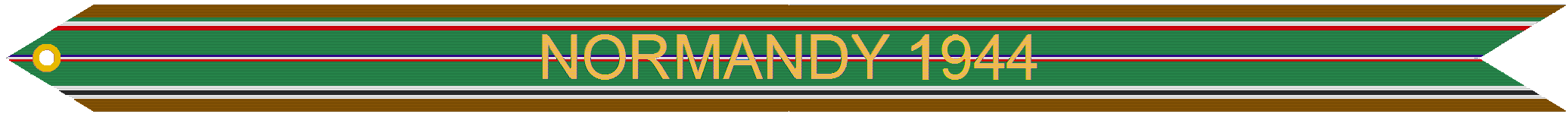
- Normandy
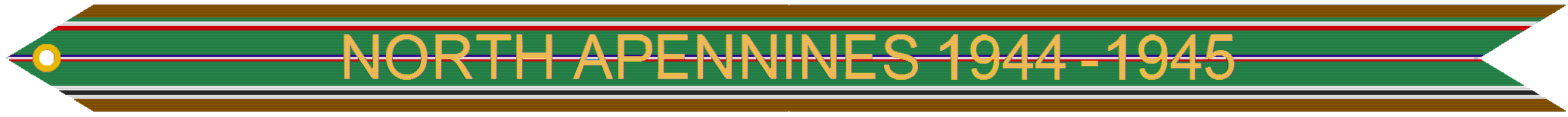
- North Apennines
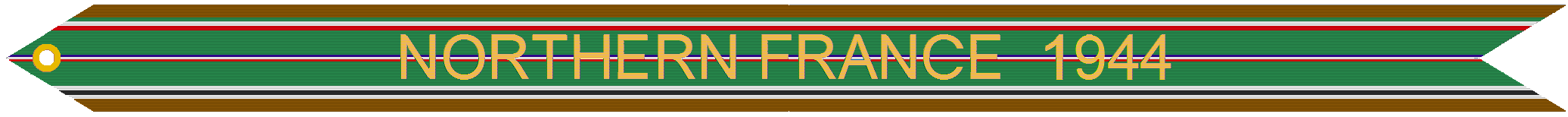
- Northern France 1944
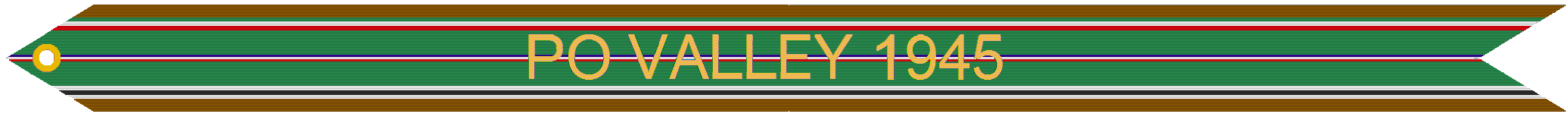
- Po Valley
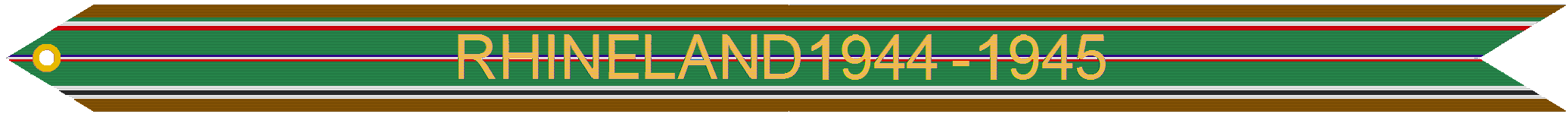
- Rhineland
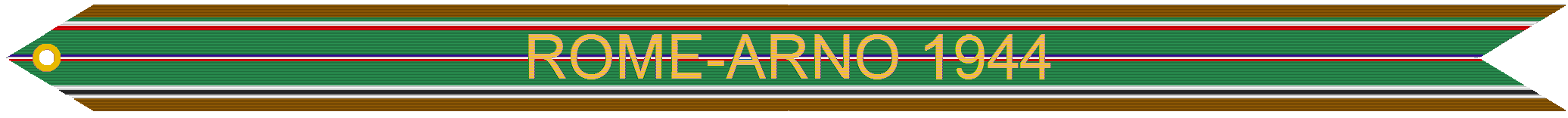
- Rome-Arno
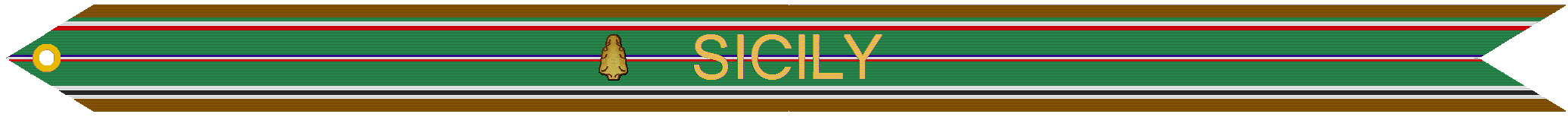
- Sicily
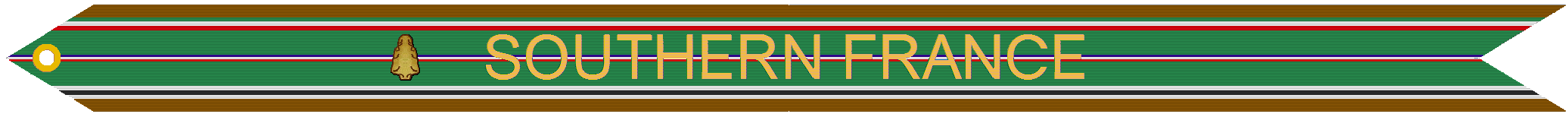
- Southern France 1944
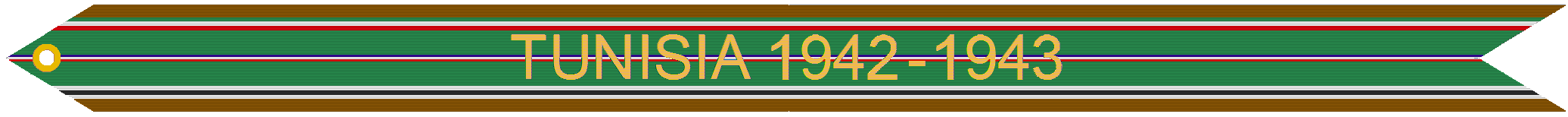
- Tunisia

Operation Iraqi Freedom

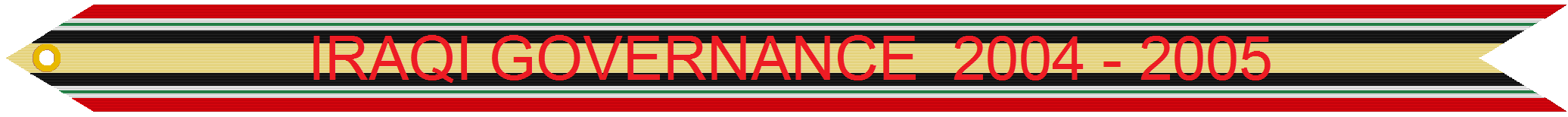
- Iraqi Governance

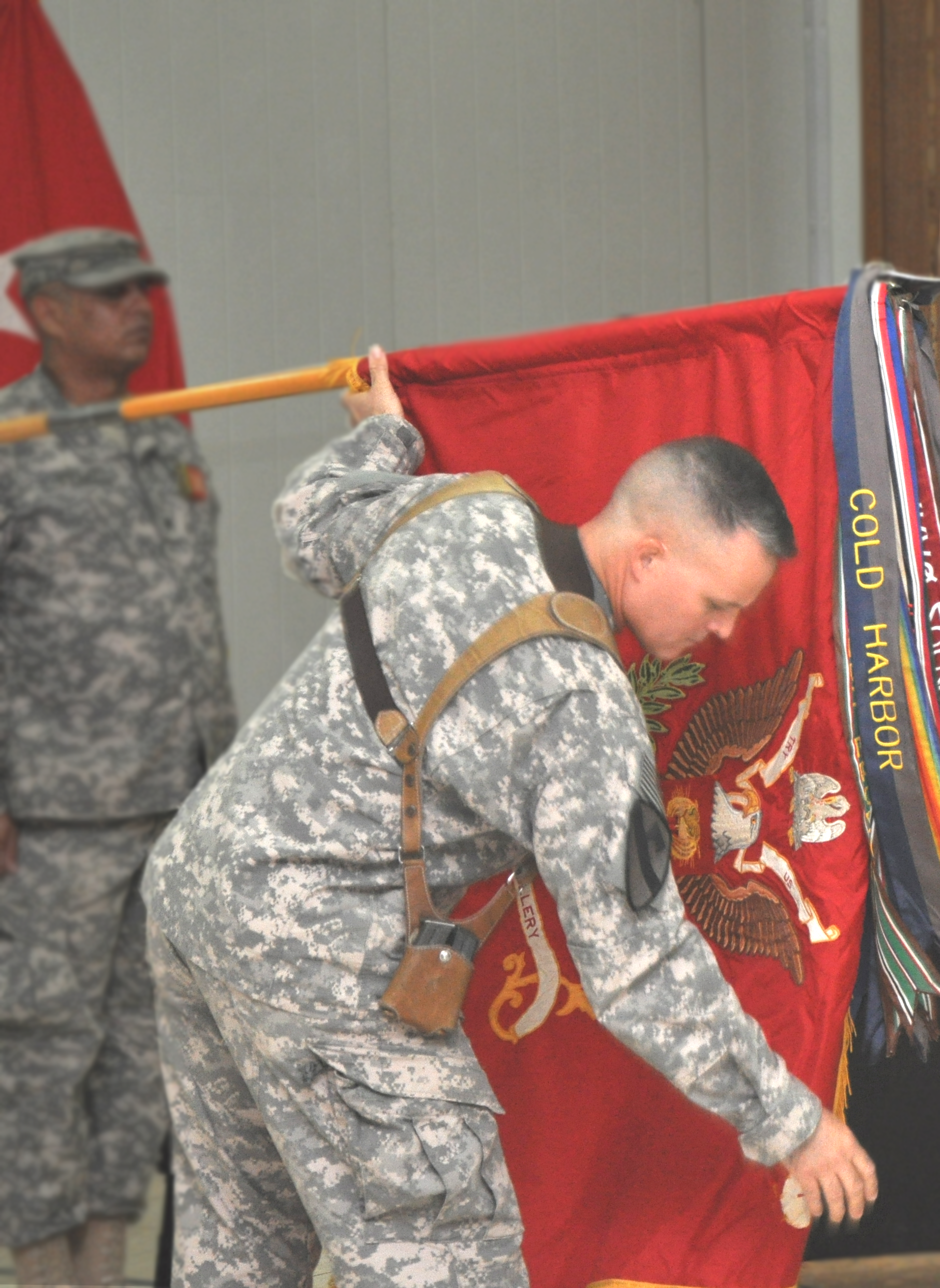
LTC Brian P. Champagne unfurling the battalion colors, Baghdad, Iraq 2010

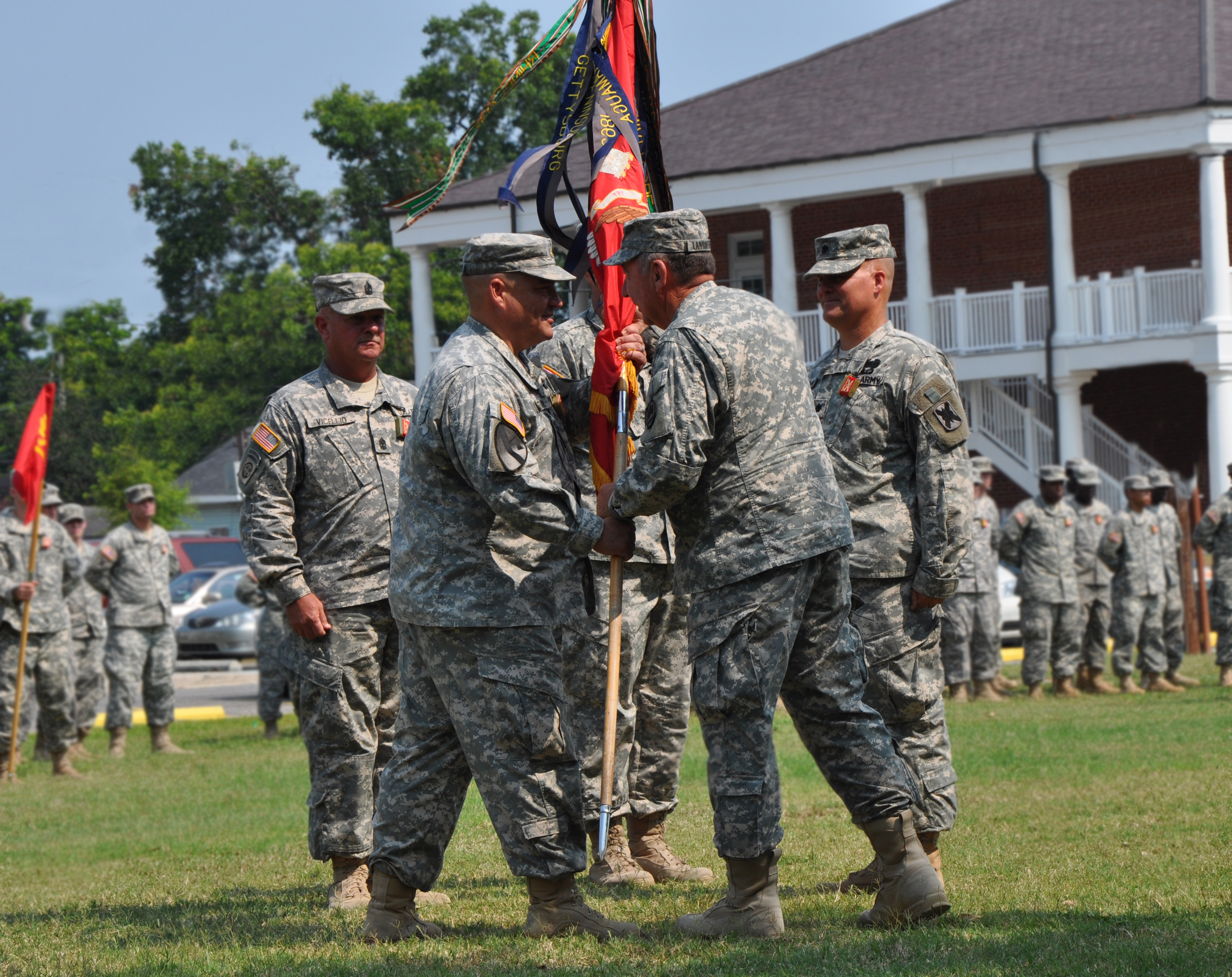
MAJ Steven M. Finney (left of center) accepts the battalion colors from the Louisiana Adjutant General, MG Bennett C. Landreneau (right of center) becoming the battalion commander in June 2011

== Current ==
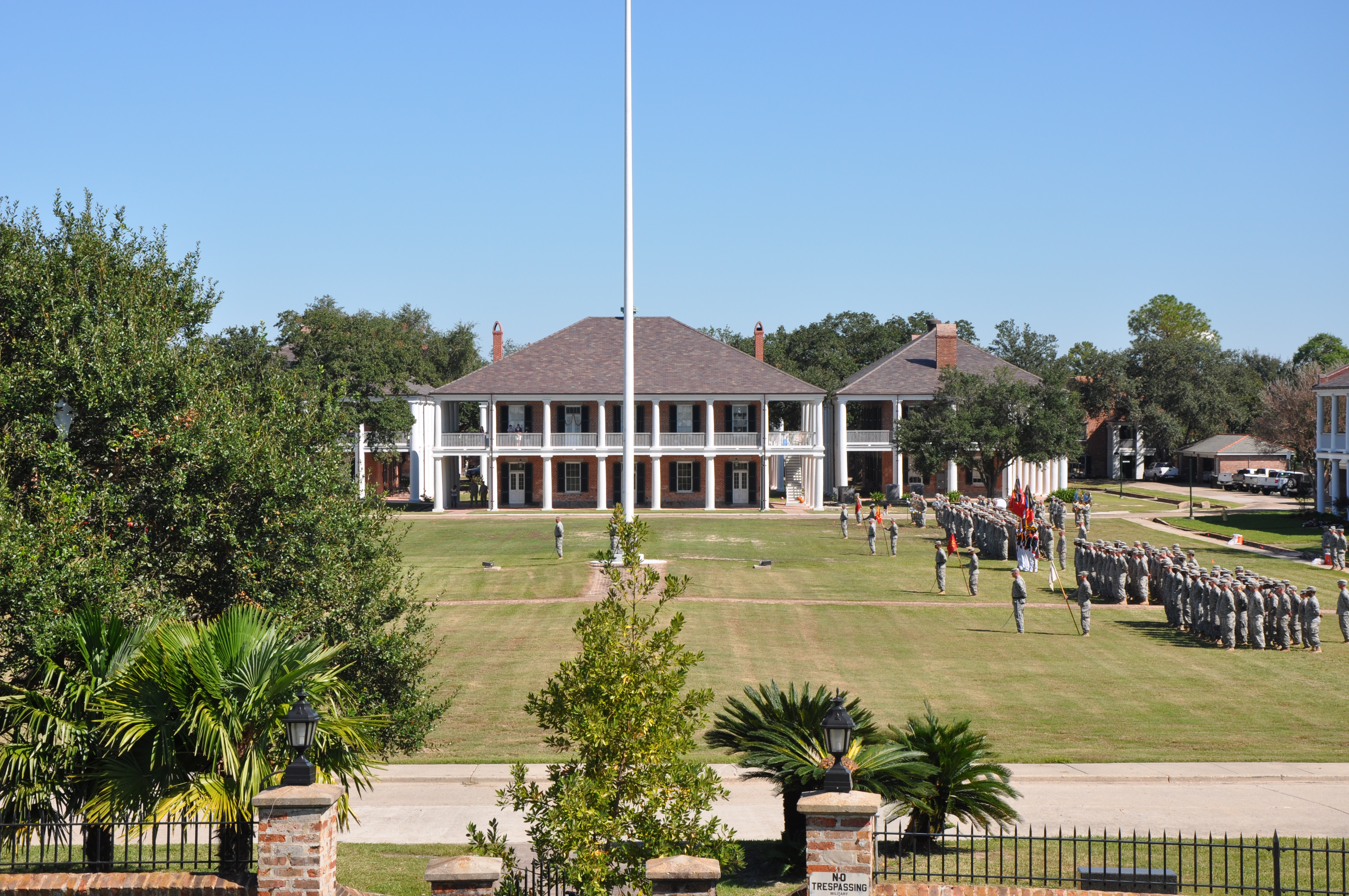
The Washington Artillery on the Parade Field at Jackson Barracks

The 141st Field Artillery currently consists of the 1st Battalion, 141st Field Artillery. It is assigned as the fires battalion for the 256th Infantry Brigade Combat Team of the Louisiana Army National Guard headquartered in the famed Jackson Barracks.

== Commanders ==
- CPT Elisha L. Tracy (Washington Artillery Company)
- CPT Henry Forno (1st Company Native American Artillery)
- CPT Isaac F. Stocton (Company "A" Washington Infantry)
- CPT Joseph E. Ealer (Washington Artillery Company)
- CPT R.O. Smith
- LT Rinaldo Banister Sr.
- CPT Augustus A. Soria
- CPT H.I. Hunting
- COL James B. Walton (Washington Artillery BN – CSA)
- COL Benjamin F. Eshleman
- COL Jacob Frolich
- COL John B. Walton (Post-Reconstruction)
- COL William M. Owen
- COL John B. Richardson
- MAJ William D. Gardiner
- COL Thomas McCabe-Hyman
- MAJ Allison Owen
- CPT Luther E. Hall (141 Field Artillery)
- MAJ Guy Molony
- MAJ Raymond H. Fleming (2nd BN Field Artillery)
- LTC Henry Curtis (141 Sep BN Field Artillery – Motorized)
- LTC Edward P. Benezech Sr. (1st BN, 141 FA Regiment)
- LTC Thurber G. Rickey (2nd BN, 141 FA Regiment)
- LTC Bernard Rausch (141 FA – WWII)
- LTC Duncan Gillis (141 FA – HQ and SVC Battery)
- LTC Numa P. Avendano (935th and 2nd BN 141 FA)
- LTC Ragnvald B. Rordam (141 Artillery BN)
- LTC Louis O. D'Amico (935th and 2nd BN 141 FA)
- LTC Armand J. Duplantier Jr. (1st and 2nd BN 141 FA), descendant of Armand Duplantier (1753–1827), aide-de-camp to General Lafayette
- LTC Pierre J. Bouis (1st and 3rd BN 141 FA)
- LTC William B. Cox (4th BN 141 FA)
- LTC Cecil A Haskins (4th BN 141 FA)
- LTC Edward P. Benezech Jr. (2nd BN 141 FA)
- LTC Vincent Beninate (4th BN 141 FA)
- LTC Douglas Ruello (2nd BN 141 FA)
- LTC Thomas P. Breslin (1st BN 141 FA – 105mm Towed)
- LTC Emile J. St. Pierre
- LTC Charles A. Bourgeois Jr.
- LTC Richard J. Gregory
- MAJ Silton J. Constance (155mm SP)
- LTC Harry M Bonnet
- LTC Russel A Mayeur Sr.
- LTC Urban B. Martinez Jr.
- LTC Rene' C. Jacques
- LTC Urban B. Martinez Jr.
- LTC Ronald A. Waller
- LTC Glenn M. Appe
- LTC Ivan M. Jones Jr.
- LTC Thomas W. Acosta Jr.
- LTC John R. Hennigan Jr.
- MAJ Russell L. Hooper (155mm "Paladin")
- LTC Jonathan T. Ball
- LTC Jordan T. Jones
- LTC Brian P. Champagne (105mmT Infantry UA)
- LTC Steven M. Finney
- LTC Kenneth T. Baillie
- MAJ Jarod W. Martin
- LTC Joseph M. Barnett
- LTC Christopher S. McElrath
- LTC Christian T. Cannon
- LTC Michael B. Lacoste (Current Commander)

Command Sergeants Major

- CSM Remy Poirrier
- CSM Ernest Simoneaux
- CSM Frank Appel
- CSM Adam Robatham
- CSM Jules ST. Germain
- CSM Gerald Leonick
- CSM Melvin Laurent
- CSM William Schmidt
- CSM Robert Smith
- CSM Patrick Tyrell
- CSM Henry Wellmeyer
- CSM Harold Butler
- CSM Robert Stiefvater
- CSM Clifford Ockman
- CSM Darrel Graf
- CSM Edward Daigle
- CSM Jimmy Vicellio
- CSM Matthew Drees
- CSM Jimmy Hankins
- CSM James Booth
- CSM Bryan Howard
