= Jackson Barracks =

Coordinates: 29°57′6″N 90°00′36″W

- U.S. National Register of Historic Places
- U.S. Historic district
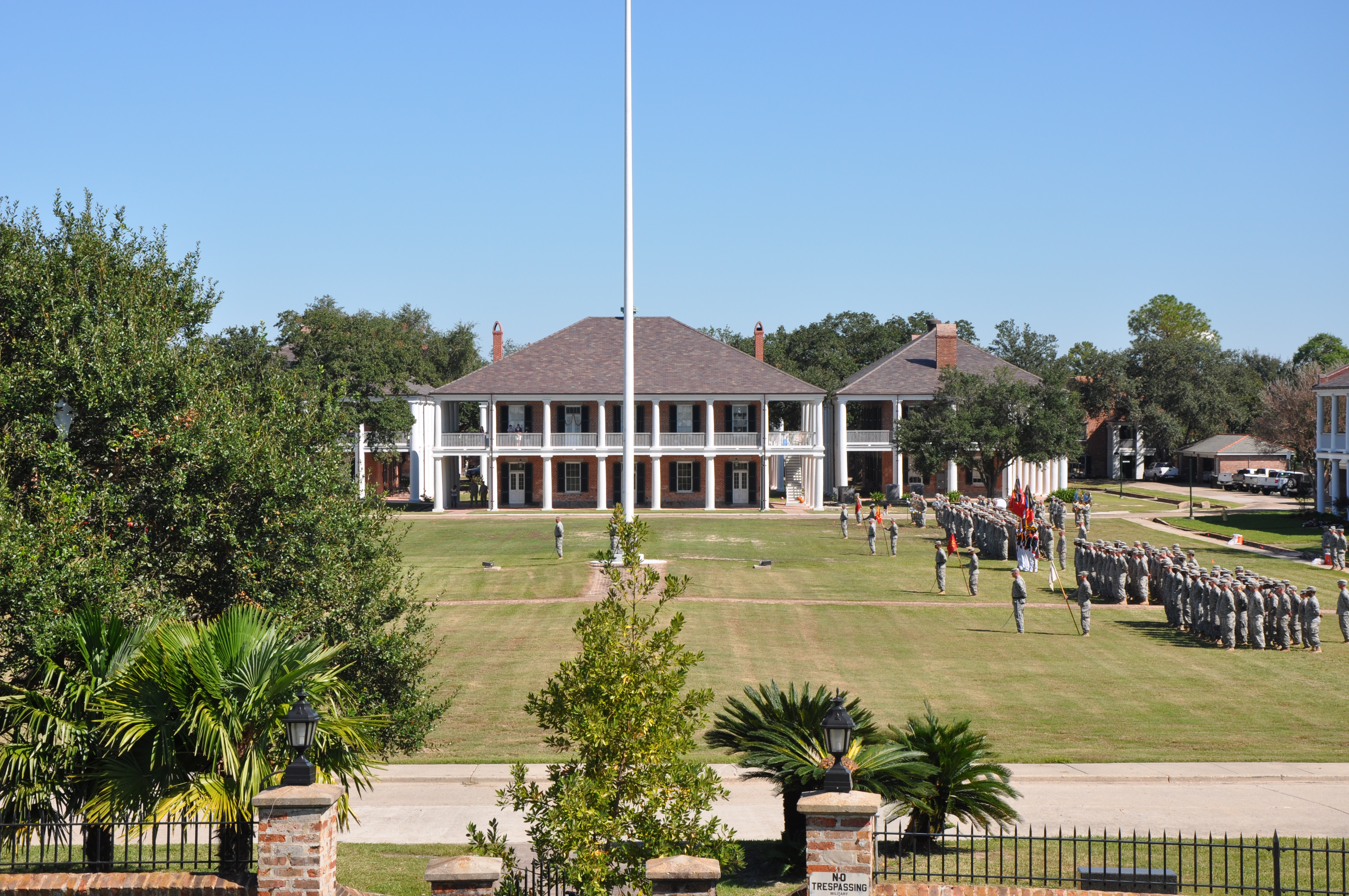
- Jackson Barracks, October 2011. The Washington Artillery on the Parade Field

- Location within East New Orleans Location within Louisiana Location within the United States
- Location: 6400 St. Claude Avenue, New Orleans, Louisiana
- Built: 1834
- Architect: Various
- Architectural style: Greek Revival
- NRHP reference No.: 76000969
- Added to NRHP: November 7, 1976

Jackson Barracks is the headquarters of the Louisiana National Guard. It is located in the Lower 9th Ward of New Orleans, Louisiana. The base was established in 1834 and was originally known as New Orleans Barracks. On July 7, 1866, it was renamed in honor of Andrew Jackson. The National Register of Historic Places listed Jackson Barracks in 1976.

== History ==
After the War of 1812, the U.S. Congress realized coastal cities did not have adequate defenses, so they prescribed the Federal Fortifications Act. The Act, signed by Congress on July 19, 1832, provided over $180,000 (~$6.21 million in 2024) (USD) for the acquisition of lands, the building of barracks to house U.S. Troops, and the establishment of command and control centers. On December 14, 1833, the Federal government purchased a 100 by 300-yard property from Pierre Cotteret to establish a new barracks in New Orleans to support the new Forts Pike, Macomb, Jackson, Livingston, and St. Philip.

Lieutenant Frederick Wilkinson, designed and supervised the building of the new logistics base; built from 1832 to 1836, the new Barracks called "New Orleans Barracks" housed four infantry companies and was equipped with a prison, a storehouse, and four 3-story guard towers. His quadrangle design, in the center of the post, was intended to be a rallying point in the event of an attack. The backs of the buildings were designed with no outward facing windows and acted as a wall. A 10-foot brick facade joined the houses and fortified the post. The front of the Barracks by the river, had a levee, road, railroad, and a trolly-car track for supplements. The back of the Barracks by St. Claude Avenue, housed a powder magazine to store ammunition. The first troops were in the barracks by February 1837.

Colonel David E. Twiggs, the commanding officer of the 2nd Regiment of Dragoons, was chosen as the first commandant of the Post. During this time, Ulysses S. Grant, Robert E. Lee, George B. McClellan, J.E.B. Stuart, P. G. T. Beauregard, were all stationed at the Barracks, although not at the same time. During the Mexican–American War, New Orleans Barracks became a post for sending and receiving troops. The wounded troops returning from Mexico initiated the construction of a federally operated hospital in 1849. It became the first Public Service Hospital for Veterans in the country.

On May 17, 1848, additional property was purchased from Mrs. Prudence Desilets expanding the Barracks north of Saint Claude Avenue to allow for the new hospital. The facility was a French-designed, four-building, two-story, open-bay hospital ward, with one surgical operating theater in the center. The hospital remained active until its demolition in 1888. The sturdy wood was salvaged and used to construct bungalows around the Barracks.
In 1861, Louisiana seceded from the United States. Confederate forces took control of the Barracks and held it for less than one year, when in 1862, Federal forces re-captured it.

On July 7, 1866, the barracks was renamed "Jackson Barracks" after the general who won the Battle of New Orleans, "Old Hickory," Andrew Jackson. Three years later, the United States reorganized its "colored troops" into colored regiments. An ACT of Congress signed March 3, 1869, reduced the four colored regiments to two. The 39th and 40th Regiments were consolidated and renumbered as the 25th Infantry Regiment headquartered at Jackson Barracks, under the command of Colonel Joseph A. Mower until May 1870. Known as the Buffalo Soldiers, they served the United States during the Indian wars and Spanish–American War.

=== Twentieth century ===
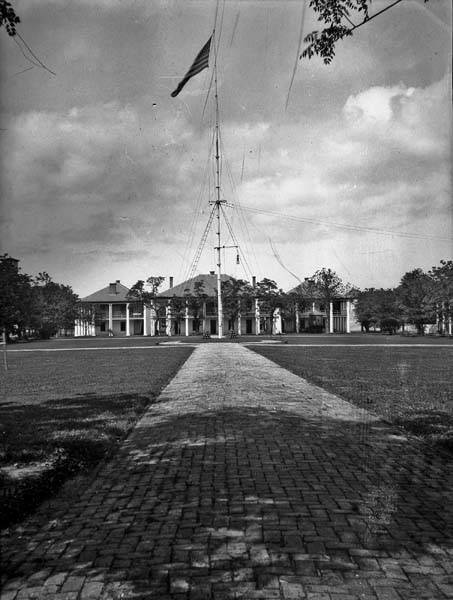
A portion of the Jackson Barracks complex at the start of the 20th century

During World War I, the Barracks was used as a mustering station. Following World War I, the property was declared excess by the federal government and given to the state of Louisiana. The Louisiana Adjutant General, Major General Raymond Fleming, made Jackson Barracks the headquarters of the Louisiana National Guard.

General Fleming transformed the post from an infantry post to a cavalry and artillery post where it housed the 108th Cavalry Regiment and the Washington Artillery. Construction of a new horse stable for the many horses posted at the barracks, and a polo field was fabricated to exercise the horses in exhibition games on the weekends.
Over the years, the Mississippi River slowly moved closer to the Barracks. Finally, in 1912, the River breached the levee that protected the post, destroying the road, railroad, and a trolly-car tracks. The executive office building and the front two guard towers were dismantled to make room for a new levee. There was not enough remaining space to allow for the construction of a new road or rail system.

During the Great Depression, Louisiana Governor Huey P. Long, Jr. used his political connections in Washington, D.C. to get federal funds for Louisiana state construction. Governor Long enlisted the Works Progress Administration (WPA), the largest and most ambitious New Deal agency, to carry out public works projects in Louisiana. Using WPA personnel, Jackson Barracks was extensively renovated, including the construction of a new executive office building named "Fleming Hall."

When the United States entered World War II, the federal government took control of the barracks to use it as a port of embarkation. Temporary billeting for men preparing to ship overseas in support of the war replaced the polo field.

During the war, the current Selective Training and Service Act of 1940 required that all men aged 18 to 45 were liable for military service for a term of one year. By the early summer of 1941, President Franklin D. Roosevelt asked the U.S. Congress to extend the term of duty for the draftees beyond twelve months. Many of the drafted soldiers threatened to desert at the conclusion of their initial twelve months of service. A plan submitted by Louisiana Adjutant General Raymond Fleming was to organize a conference and study the best way to procure manpower in the event of an emergency and develop a new Selective Service Act. Jackson Barracks was the location chosen to host the Conference. The finalized Report #2438 was submitted to the 80th Congress - 2d Session and became the Selective Service Act of 1948; it required all men aged 19 to 26 to register and were liable for 21 months' service, followed by five years of reserve duty.

At the conclusion of World War II, the barracks reverted to the state of Louisiana for use as the Louisiana National Guard headquarters, with a proviso that the federal government can, at any time of crisis, take control of the property.

=== Post World War II ===
In 1960, the Louisiana Department of Corrections acquired a portion of Jackson Barracks to build and operate a work release prison. Later that year construction of two Armories began. The National Register of Historic Places registered Jackson Barracks in 1976. In 1977, the transformation of the renovated Old Powder Magazine into the official Louisiana National Guard Museum began. Officially named, Ansel M. Stroud, Jr. Military History and Weapons Museum it contains artifacts from each of the nine major United States conflicts. The museum is a member of the Army Museum System.

In 1991, Warren Carmouche the founder of Thugs United started the Jackson Barracks Prison project. With the help of Loyola University, the prison gained a library, law school classes, literacy classes, creative writing, and conflict resolution classes. In 1993, the prison closed as a consequence of a three-man escape and a subsequent murder by the escapees. In 1995, there was an extensive renovation of the armories, construction of an Organizational Maintenance Shop, and the now-inactive prison compound transformed into a police training facility. In 2005, the entire Jackson Barracks Complex was virtually destroyed by floodwater from Hurricane Katrina.

=== Hurricane Katrina ===
On August 29, 2005 Hurricane Katrina made its landfall in southeast Louisiana as a Category 3 storm. As the storm moved inland, the storm surge caused a breach in the Industrial Canal levee and submerged parts of Jackson Barracks with more than 20-feet of water. Residents and troops were caught in the floodwater and evacuated via boats to the Mississippi River levee, where National Guard helicopter pilots evacuated them to the Louisiana Superdome. The tidal surge virtually destroyed the entire Jackson Barracks Complex. Secretary of the Army Francis J. Harvey after touring the devastated Barracks, noted that Jackson Barracks is "a very important piece of American history that needs to be preserved."

=== Rebuilding ===
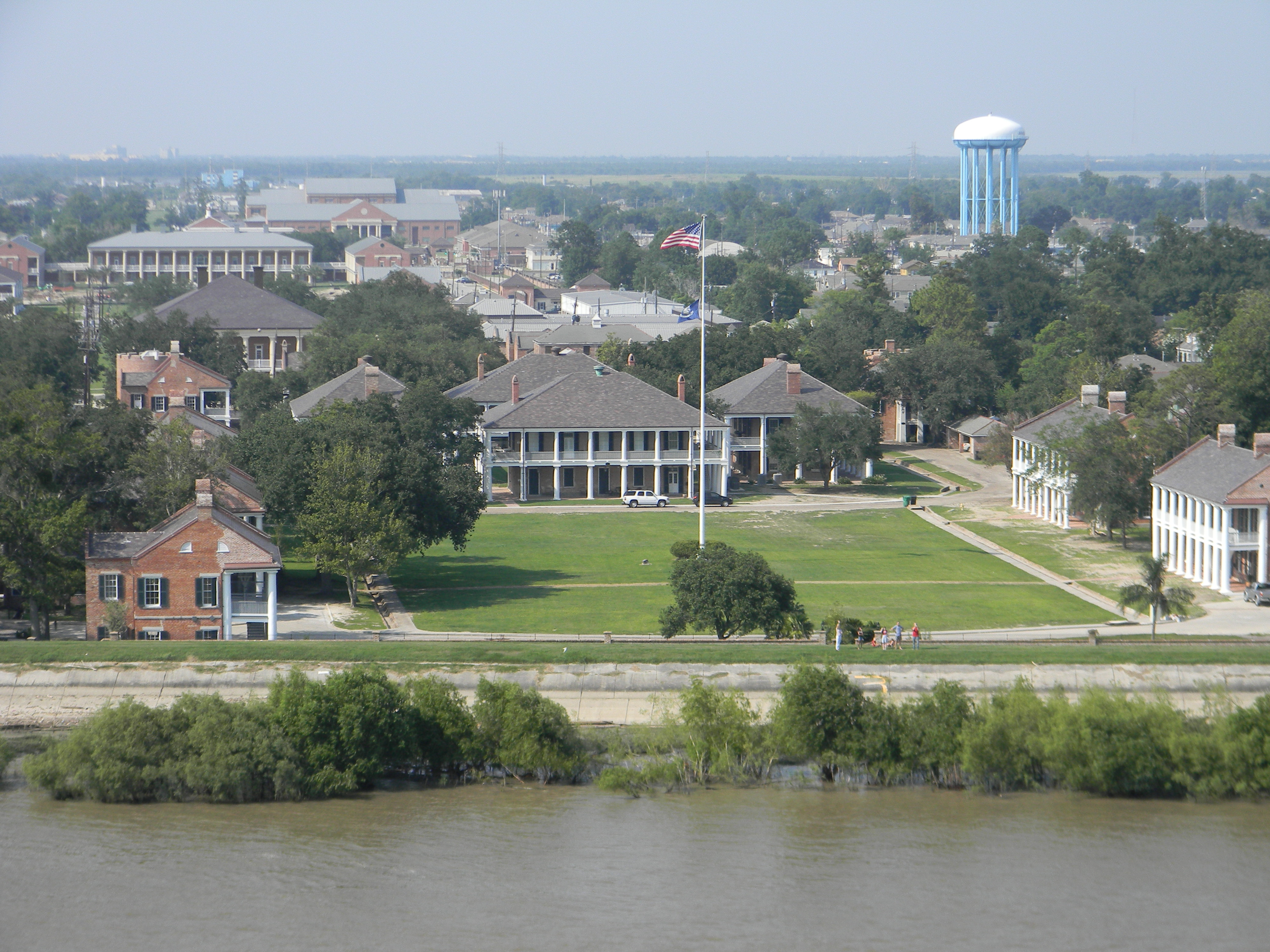
From the Mississippi River, July 2011

Congress authorized 100 percent of the funding for reconstruction. The rebuilding of the majority of the Barracks was from scratch, except the 1837 Old Powder Magazine and 14 antebellum homes in the Original Garrison that received a $35 million restoration fund from the Federal Emergency Management Agency. The entire complex was redesigned, so all office and executive complexes were in proximity, and all new structures would have their operational infrastructures above the first floor.

The Jackson Barracks Historical Renovation was created to ensure the preservation of the mostly intact historical area. ENR Texas & Louisiana was chosen to head the project. Yeates & Yeates Architects, New Orleans was selected to design structures matching the original Greek Revival theme. Most of the historical buildings were fully renovated, including structure replacement. The team fully restored over 17,500 square feet of wood-framed buildings to original designs and used original materials when possible.

The total cost of reconstruction due to Hurricane Katrina was $325 million. Construction included 91 new housing cottages at the north end of the barracks and new armories with state-of-the-art features, including a bomb-proof facade, advanced fire retardant systems, dedicated water and electricity utilities, and stand-alone command and control facilities. In 2013 the Ansel M. Stroud, Jr. Military History and Weapons Museum reopened, in a new multi-use complex with exhibits covering the Louisiana Guard response to Hurricane Katrina, Louisiana soldiers and airmen involvement in the Global War on Terror, The Gulf War of 1990–1991, and other National Guard and Louisiana military history topics. A new area features temporary and traveling exhibits. The museum is one of two focusing on the Louisiana National Guard; the other is the Louisiana Maneuvers and Military Museum in Pineville, Louisiana.
