= Yasser Salihee =

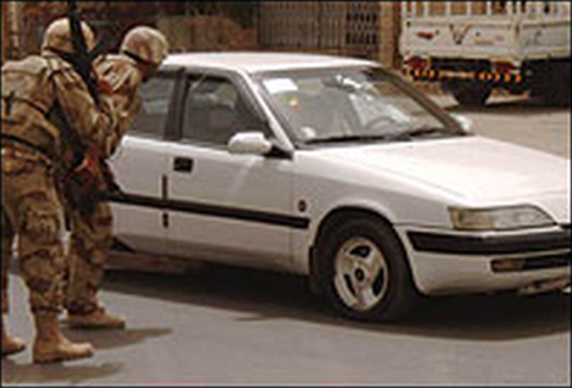
- Iraqi Security Forces peer into the car of journalist Yasser Salihee, after he was killed by an American sniper in Baghdad, 2005.
- Born: 30 June 1974; Baghdad, Iraq
- Died: 24 June 2005 (aged 30); Baghdad, Iraq
- Cause of death: U.S. Army sniper
- Occupations: Doctor, journalist
- Employer(s): Knight Ridder, NPR

Yasser Salihee (1974–2005) was an Iraqi doctor and journalist from Baghdad. After the 2003 U.S. invasion of Iraq, he published in newspapers throughout the United States, and was known among colleagues for mixing medical and journalistic work. In 2005 Salihee began an investigation of torture and killings by Iraqi Interior Ministry commandos known as the Wolf Brigade. Salihee was killed by a U.S. army sniper on 24 June 2005 while approaching an unmarked checkpoint.

Salihee's death received international attention as emblematic of the problems facing journalists and security in Iraq during the war.

== Career ==
At the start of the American-led Iraq War, Salihee was a doctor in Baghdad, and married to another doctor in the city. Struggling to support his family on the Iraqi Health Ministry's salary, he began working for the U.S. National Public Radio and for Japanese news services. Salihee was able to earn a whole months' salary as a doctor working a single day while translating for American media. In early 2004, Salihee approached Knight Ridder's Baghdad bureau requesting work as a journalist. The bureau was looking for an office manager but nevertheless hired Salihee, who quickly became a favorite among his colleagues. As a correspondent for Knight Ridder, Salihee took great risks "to gather scraps of truth in a place filled with deceit and danger," according to colleague and reporter Hannah Allam. Allam wrote that Salihee was motivated by a desire to show American readers the reality of life for Iraqis in a war zone.

Salihee covered fighting in the Sunni region dubbed the "Triangle of Death," and the consequences of fighting in Najaf. He interviewed senior Iraqi politicians and insurgents, and saved the lives of some journalists by convincing armed insurgents that he and his colleagues were not combatants. Salihee sometimes used his medical expertise to aid the wounded at sites he reported on, once joking that he "was doing sutures, taking notes, doing sutures, taking notes." Salihee's patients often became his sources. On or off work, Salihee took pains to teach fellow journalists about his native country.

Writing for the San Jose Mercury News and other papers throughout the United States, Salihee's articles often covered subjects related to police torture of detainees in Iraq, and the dangers of driving alone, as a man, in Baghdad.

Colleague and fellow journalist Philip Robertson described Salihee as more of "a scientist than a reporter," with "a great deal of curiosity and respect for facts." Juan Cole, professor of Middle Eastern history, described Salihee as having "a great deal of promise," and as "a brave and decent man, and an excellent reporter who drew back the veil on key events in Iraq and their meaning."

== Investigation of Iraqi Interior Ministry ==
In May 2005, The New York Times Magazine published a story on the creation of Iraqi Interior Ministry commandos called the "Wolf Brigade," with the help of U.S. military advisors, following the model used by death squads in El Salvador in the 1980s. Following the story's publication, Salihee began his own investigation into the brigade's formation and activities, at the same time that the brigade was conducting an anti-insurgent campaign in Baghdad termed "Operation Lightning." In this project he worked as a special correspondent for Knight Ridder news service.

Salihee and his colleague found "more than 30 examples in less than a week" of instances in which Iraqis would be detained by commandos, and their bodies later brought to morgues with signs of torture and execution. Investigating individual cases, Salihee and Lassiter found that Iraqis would be abducted by commandos in white police Land Cruisers and American-made pistols and body armor. They would then be tortured using whips, electrocution, beating and choking, before being executed.

Investigative journalist Nicholas Davies describes Salihee's report, published after his death, as "one of the most thorough investigations conducted into the reality behind the horrors of the dirty war in Iraq." He adds, "In fairness to later investigators, Salihee's death and the growing climate of terror in Baghdad certainly had the effect of making subsequent investigations increasingly dangerous for reporters."

== Death ==
Salihee was killed by a single American sniper bullet that struck his head on 24 June 2005, at a checkpoint created that morning by U.S. and Iraqi soldiers, near Salihee's home in western Baghdad. Salihee was on his day off, going to fuel his car before picking up his daughter for swimming.

According to one eyewitness interviewed by journalist Philip Robertson, Salihee tried to pass a first car, then pulled over, raised his hands, and was shot. Another witness interviewed by Robertson stated that two American soldiers fired at the same time.

According to a witness interviewed by NPR, Salihee was killed by the first bullet fired. Another witness interviewed by NPR stated that Salihee saw the soldiers, and was shot as he hit the brakes. A third witness interviewed by NPR said that three shots were fired, the first as the car tried to stop. The witness said the car was coming "very fast" but screeched to a halt.

An Iraqi police report describes Salihee's car as stationed parallel against the curb following his death, and Salihee's brother states that the car's transmission was in neutral, and Salihee's foot on the brake, when he arrived. Salihee lost a number of fingers on his right hand, suggesting according to Robertson that he was shot with his hands raised.

The American and Iraqi soldiers at the checkpoint did not put up warning cones or protective wire. After the shooting, American soldiers left Salihee in his car and left the area.

Robertson was also able to interview the sniper who killed Salihee by embedding with his unit. The soldier had originally trained as a member of the special forces, becoming a sniper for the U.S. Army Rangers. Leaving the army, he rejoined the National Guard after the 11 September 2001 terrorist attack. According to the soldier, the intersection where Salihee was killed was a dangerous one for American soldiers, where one had been killed or wounded only the day before Salihee's death, prompting them to search the area the next morning. The soldier stated that two cars approached their position, the second driven by Salihee, traveling "more than 20 miles an hour" and then swerving around the first car. The soldier stated that he fired three warning shots, the first at 150 meters, while the car did not slow down, before firing the fatal shot at 20 or 30 meters. The soldier expressed extreme remorse for his action, which he stated was driven by fear that Salihee might be a suicide bomber. A U.S. Army investigation found that Salihee was killed under the rules of engagement. The soldier was later imprisoned for alleged possession and distribution of drugs.

Salihee was killed just one week before his birthday on 30 June. His killing received international publicity and worsened relations between Iraqis and U.S. soldiers at the location of his death.

Salihee's brother describes the Army report on his death as a cover-up meant to protect U.S. and Iraqi soldiers from wrongdoing, and like most in the neighborhood where Salihee was killed, believes that Salihee had stopped before he was shot. Hannah Allam calls the investigation "callous," but also wrote that "there's no reason to think that the shooting had anything to do with [Salihee's] reporting work." James Cogan, writing for the World Socialist Web Site, states that Salihee's "last assignment gives reason to suspect that it was," citing Salihee's effort to investigate alleged death squads. Davies writes that "the links between the forces Yasser Salihee was investigating and the ones that killed him cast a long dark shadow over his death." According to the Daily Kos blog, three journalists, including Steve Vincent, Yasser Salihee and Fakher Haider, were shot to death in Iraq in 2005 while investigating Interior Ministry commandos. After interviewing the American soldier and nearby witnesses, Robertson concluded that the death was tragic but "a typical misunderstanding, of the sort that happens all the time in Iraq."

After Salihee's death, Juan Cole wrote that "most Iraqi civilians killed by US military forces remain anonymous." Cole described Salihee's death as a "symbol for the current debacle in Iraq," writing that as Iraq's situation worsened, journalists were unable to report on it, either because they had fled, been killed, or feared for their lives.

== See also ==
- Knight Ridder
- Ministry of Interior (Iraq)
- Wolf Brigade (Iraq)
- 256th Infantry Brigade Combat Team (United States)
