= 3rd Squadron, 108th Cavalry Regiment =

- 108th Cavalry Regiment Distinctive Unit Insignia
- Active: 2008–2016
- Country: United States
- Branch: Army National Guard
- Type: Cavalry
- Role: Reconnaissance and Surveillance
- Size: Squadron
- Part of: 560th Battlefield Surveillance Brigade
- Garrison/HQ: Atlanta, Georgia
- Nickname: Renegades
- Patron: Saint George
- Motto: Come What Will
- Engagements: Kosovo Force

Commanders
- Commander: LTC Michael Lipper
- Command Sergeant Major: CSM Thomas Grisham

The 3rd Squadron (R&S), 108th Cavalry Regiment was the reconnaissance and surveillance element of the 560th Battlefield Surveillance Brigade of the Georgia Army National Guard. The squadron was headquartered in Atlanta, Georgia. Nicknamed Renegades, it consisted of:

- Headquarters, Headquarters Troop, located in Atlanta, Georgia
- Troop A, located in Atlanta, Georgia
- Troop B, located in Atlanta, Georgia
- Company H (Airborne), 121st Infantry Regiment, (Long-Range Surveillance), located in Atlanta, Georgia
- 165th Quartermaster Company (Light Airdrop Supply) was attached to provide parachute rigger support

Many of the squadron’s units were reassigned and reflagged to form the Georgia Army National Guard’s new 3rd Battalion, 121st Infantry Regiment. The 3rd Infantry Battalion now falls under the 48th Infantry Brigade Combat Team which falls under the Active Duty 3rd Infantry Division as part of the Army’s Associated Unit Program to combine Active, National Guard and Reserve units to combine strength and combat efficiency.

== Leadership & organization ==
Commander	Years	Command Sergeant Major	Years
LTC Michael Lipper	2014–present		
LTC Joseph Lynch	2011–2014	CSM Thomas Grisham	2013–Present
LTC Jeffrey Dickerson	2010–2011	CSM Matthew Marks	2008–2013
LTC Paul Smith	2008–2010		
MAJ Matthew Saxton	2007-2008		

== History ==
The 3rd Squadron, 108th Cavalry Regiment was constituted 1 November 2007 in the Georgia Army National Guard and organized 1 December 2007 with its headquarters in Atlanta. Some of its members had once been part of the 48th Brigade, which had deployed to Iraq from 2005–2006 and Afghanistan in 2009. H Co 121 Inf LRS was moved from the 221st MI Battalion and consisted of paratroopers who had deployed to Iraq in March, 2003 as well as in 2006-2007.

2008

The 3-108th conducted its first annual training at Fort Stewart, Georgia and it also participated in Operation Yama Sakura at Fort Lewis in the state of Washington. During this year the 3-108th assumed the duties of the state of Georgia's National Guard primary QRF . A Troop and B Troop were the primary QRFs for this mission, while H Co 121 Inf LRS was used in reserve. Also during this year A Troop conducted an ODT at JMRC in Germany as the OPFOR in OCT 2009.

2009

The 3-108th continued its role as primary QRF for the state of Georgia. During this year, the 3-108th Squadron participated in the NATO Exercise Lancer and Longbow in the Republic of Georgia and hosted a Pathfinder MTT at Fort Stewart, Georgia. Lastly, the 3-108th participated in Leapfest, taking third and fifth place.

2010

This year was an eventful year for the 3-108th. H Co 121 Inf LRS participated in a joint Airborne mission with the Australian Army to commemorate the newly designated Blair DZ at Catoosa, Georgia. A and B Troop established the order of Saint George Program this year. Members of C Troop participated in a Combat Tracker course at Camp Merrill, Georgia. The 3-108 completed annual training in Scotland during operations Scottish Buzzard and Prickly Pear.

2011

In 2011, the 3-108th was involved with Atlas Drop, an annually scheduled exercise which helps to train U.S. European Command's forces to respond regionally throughout Europe. H Co 121 Inf LRS participated in Joint Operation Patriot Drop at Fort McCoy in the state of Wisconsin.

In April 2011, the unit received a warning order to prepare to mobilize in order to help with the ongoing NATO mission in Kosovo. In August the 3-108th squadron completed its annual training at Fort Stewart, Georgia. After completing this training, the unit went to Camp Atterbury in Indiana and then to Joint Multinational Readiness Center (JMRC) Hohenfels, Germany for further training. Upon completing this training, the 3rd Squadron, 108th Cavalry deployed to Camp Bondsteel and Novo Selo in Kosovo.

Once at Camp Bondsteel, the 3rd Squadron, 108th Cavalry began to train with KFOR 14 in order to take over the NATO mission from them. The squadron headquarters was task organized to augment the Multi-National Battle Group-East headquarters due to shortfalls in staffing the higher headquarters duty positions, under the command of 157th Maneuver Enhancement Brigade, Wisconsin Army National Guard. Typically, when units deploy the squadron headquarters remains intact to act as the mid-level leadership team. The battle group commander made the decision to eliminate the mid-level leadership team early during the mobilization training in Indiana. The reconnaissance troops were task organized into one separate unit under the control of the battle group headquarters and conducts their liaison monitoring missions in southern Kosovo. The Long Range Surveillance (LRS) Company was task organized to be under control of the battle group headquarters as well and conducts situational awareness patrols, Observation Post, and Site Security missions. When the LRS Company is rotated into north Kosovo, they then report to the forward command post (FCP) for tactical operations. This is similar for all the contributing nations. When the companies rotate into the north Kosovo area, the FCP is responsible for the tactical missions. Multi-national units that are assigned to the north Kosovo region include: Moroccan, German French, Polish, Ukrainian, Turkish, and American forces.<1>

2012

Currently the 3rd Squadron, 108th Cavalry is conducting these missions throughout Kosovo.

Primary tasks:

Tactical command and control operations involve planning, rehearsing and executing missions of multi-national forces. Moroccan, German, French, Polish, Ukrainian, Turkish, and American forces rotate into the north Kosovo area to ensure freedom of movement, safety and security operations, and supporting the institutions of Kosovo. When these forces rotate into the northern Kosovo region, the Forward Command Post assumes responsibility for all operations and logistics support.<1>

Security force operations involve the conducting situational awareness patrols, vehicle check points, and site security. These Soldiers are at the forefront of every operation conducted in northern Kosovo. The key to success for these Soldiers is their leadership, both officers and non-commissioned officers, developing strong relationships with their multi-national partners in order to share techniques and best practices.<1>

Liaison monitoring operations are conducted by cavalry troops in the southern Kosovo area, which is calm and presents an atmosphere of cooperation. These teams monitor the socio-economic climate and keep the leadership informed of any changes in the mood of the people.<1>

From August 18 through the 21st 3-108th participated in NCO and soldier of the year competition at Camp Bondsteel against other National Guard units. The 3-108th took first place in both competitions. The winner for soldier of the year was Spc. Ludecke and the winner for NCO of the year was SSG Eubank.

2013

3-108th returned to the United States following a successful mission in Kosovo.

2014

3-108th conducted a split Annual Training at Fort Stewart, Georgia in March and Fort McClellan, Alabama in July. Headquarters and Headquarters Troop, A Troop, and B Troop moved into a new facility at the Atlanta Regional Readiness Center.

2015

The Squadron continues to conduct training in support of State and Federal missions. 3-108th Conducted Annual Training at Fort Stewart Georgia, where the Scouts of 1st Platoon, Blackfoot Troop were the Top Gun during mounted gunnery. The unit also began preparations to disband and re-flag as 3rd Battalion, 121st Infantry. This move came as a result of the dissolution of the 560th BFSB, the unit's parent Brigade. The Army had made the decision to realign BFSB units. Plans are in place to add additional infantry battalions to major infantry Brigades and to better integrate National Guard and Active Duty army maneuver units.

2016

As of March 5, 2016 the 3-108th ceased was deactivated. Most of the 19D cavalry scouts and the infantrymen of H Co 121 Infantry (LRS) formed the skeleton for the newly re-flagged 3d Battalion, 121st Infantry Regiment, which became the third infantry battalion of the 48th IBCT. Many of the soldiers were recognized for their service, and many of the troopers who were with the unit when it was stood up in 2007 were still in the unit and present for its "Casing of the Colors." Renegades, "Into the night."

== Sources ==
- US Army Center of Military History
