= 1st Squadron, 108th Cavalry Regiment =

- 108th Cavalry Regiment Distinctive unit insignia
- Active: 1959 - Present
- Country: United States
- Allegiance: Georgia
- Branch: (United States Army) Army National Guard
- Type: Cavalry
- Role: Reconnaissance, surveillance, and target acquisition (RSTA)
- Size: Squadron
- Part of: 48th Infantry Brigade Combat Team
- Garrison/HQ: Calhoun, Georgia
- Nickname: Rough Riders
- Patron: Saint George
- Motto: Come What Will
- Colors: Yellow, Red, White
- Engagements: World War II, Iraq Campaign, Afghanistan Campaign
- Decorations: Meritorious Unit Commendation, Philippine Presidential Unit Citation (HHT, 1-108th Cavalry)

Commanders
- Commander: LTC Jace A. Walden
- Command Sergeant Major: CSM Timothy C. Deane

The 1st Squadron, 108th Cavalry Regiment is a reconnaissance, surveillance, and target acquisition squadron of the 48th Infantry Brigade Combat Team (48th IBCT), Georgia Army National Guard. 1st Squadron provides the 48th IBCT both mounted and dismounted reconnaissance capabilities. Prior to 2007, the unit was designated as the 1st Battalion, 108th Armor Regiment.

== History ==
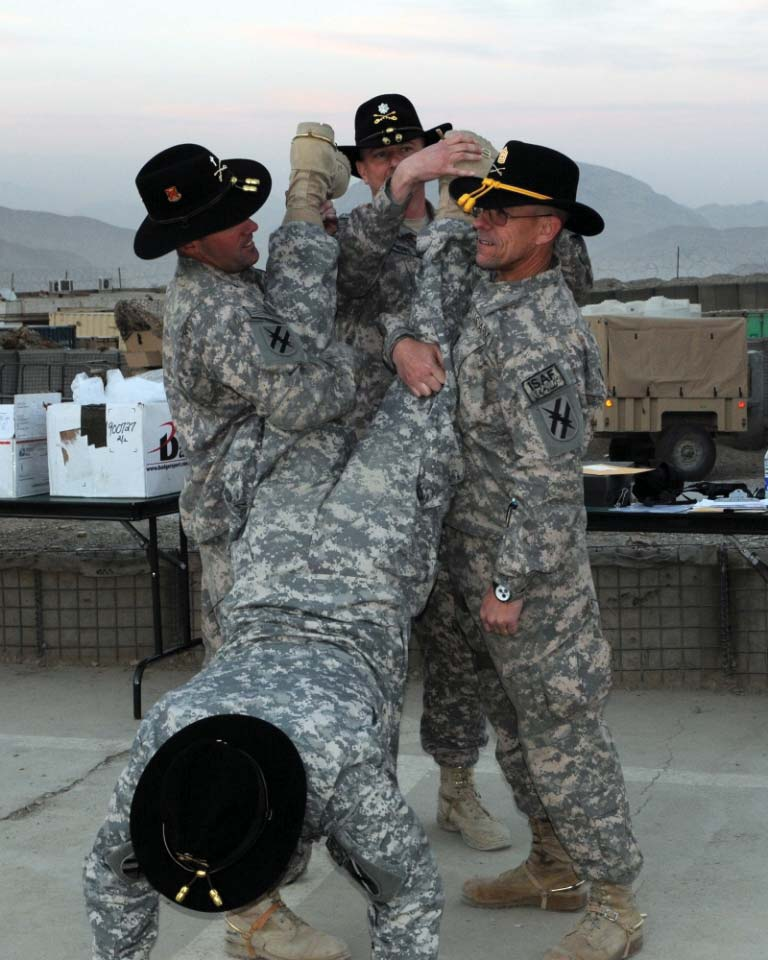
A trooper from the 1st Squadron, 108th Cavalry receives his golden spurs as part of the 'Roughriders' New Year's celebration event at FOB Torkham, Afghanistan. Golden spurs are awarded to Cavalry Troopers for service with a Cavalry unit in a combat zone.

=== Desert Storm & Bosnia and Herzegovina ===
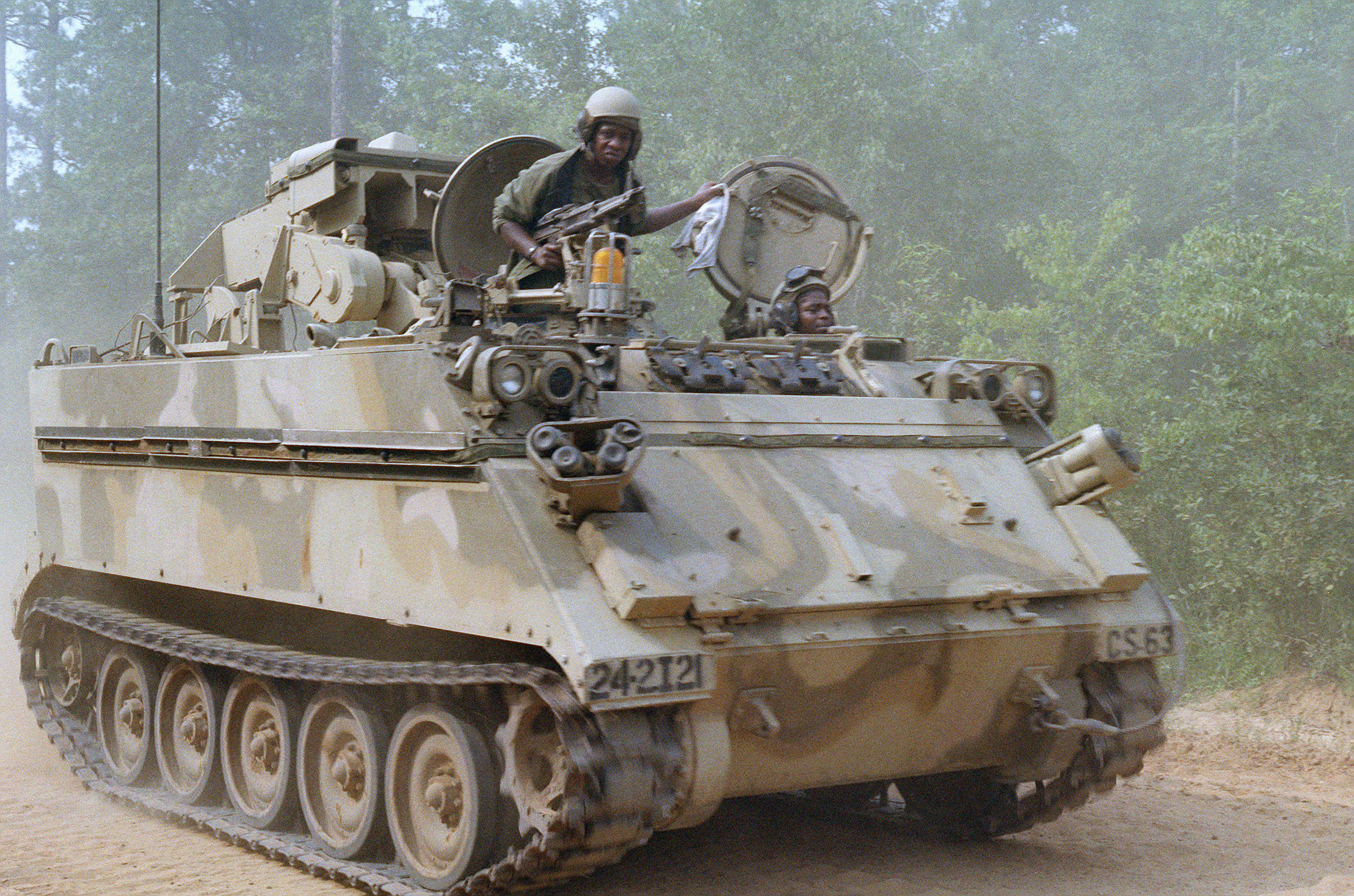
A M901 ITV vehicle from the 1st Platoon, 48th Brigade, 108th Armor Regiment, Georgia National Guard, moves through a recently cleared roadblock during the training Exercise COMPANY TEAM DEFENSE. July 17, 1983

The 1st Battalion, 108th Armor mobilized for Desert Storm, but were not deployed in time to be able to participate in the war. After certifying at the National Training Center as combat-ready, they demobilized.

The 1st Battalion, 108th Armor deployed to Bosnia and Herzegovina for Stabilization Force (SFOR) Rotation 9 to provide support operations for Task Force Eagle (United States contingent to United Nations Operations in support of Dayton Peace Accord). The SFOR9 rotation was scheduled from April to October 2001.

=== War on terrorism ===
The 1st Battalion, 108th Armor mobilized as a component of the 48th Brigade Combat Team in 2004 for combat operations in support of the Global War on Terrorism. It was augmented with an additional Infantry company from Alabama and organized as Task Force (TF) Roughrider. In May 2005 the unit began deploying to Iraq as part of Operation Iraqi Freedom (OIF) and experienced some of the fiercest combat actions in the campaign. During the first half of the brigade's deployment (Spring 2005 through Spring 2006) to Iraq, the 1-108th spent much of its time conducting cordon and search operations, reconnaissance missions, and raids in Iraq's Triangle of Death region southwest of Baghdad. The unit's focus shifted during the second half of the deployment to a theater security mission primarily consisting of convoy escort and civilian military operations. On 20 April 2006, at Ft. Stewart, members of the 1-108th returned home after a year of combat operations in Iraq.

TF Roughrider suffered seven fatalities while deployed to Iraq:

- SGT Paul A. Saylor (15 August 2005)
- SPC Joshua P. Dingler (15 August 2005)
- SGT Thomas J. Strickland (15 August 2005)
- SGT Michael J. Stokely (16 August 2005)
- SSG George R. Draughn, Jr. (1 September 2005)
- SFC Robert Hollar, Jr. (1 September 2005)
- 1SG Aaron D. Jagger (9 August 2006)

As a part of the United States Army's ongoing transformation to a lighter, more modular force the 1st Battalion, 108th Armor was re-designated as the 1st Squadron, 108th Cavalry (RSTA) in 2007. The unit traded in its M1 Abrams tanks and its M2 Bradley Fighting Vehicles for up-armored HMMWVs. Most of the squadron's tank crewmen have reclassified to 19D cavalry scouts or 11B infantrymen.

In December 2007, the Georgia National Guard's 48th Infantry Brigade Combat Team (IBCT) was alerted that it will be deployed to Afghanistan in the summer of 2009 in support of Operation Enduring Freedom (OEF). In January 2009, the 1-108th began training for the expected year-long deployment. The unit was subsequently deployed to Afghanistan in April as Task Force Roughrider.

While deployed in support of Operation Enduring Freedom, the 1-108th participated in training the Afghan Security Forces while conducting Counter Insurgency Operations throughout the country. In March 2010 the unit redeployed from Afghanistan and demobilized at Fort Stewart, GA. TF Roughrider suffered six fatalities while deployed to Afghanistan:

- MAJ Kevin M. Jenrette (4 June 2009)
- SGT Jeffrey W. Jordan (4 June 2009)
- SFC John C. Beale (4 June 2009)
- 1SG John D. Blair (20 June 2009)
- SGT Isaac L. Johnson, Jr. (6 July 2009)
- SGT Raymundo P. Morales (21 July 2009)

== Leadership & Organization ==
Commander	Years	Command Sergeant Major	Years
LTC Horace Cleary			
LTC Forrest McKelvey			
LTC James P. Stephens			
MAJ Atkinson	1973 - 1974		
LTC Harold W. Carlisle	1974 - 1977		
LTC William V. Wigley	1977 - 1980		
LTC William A. Holland	1980 - 1984	CSM John T. Woods	
LTC Tommy Lewis	1984 - 1986	CSM Carl Shugart	
LTC William T. Thielemann	1986 - 1988	CSM John T. Woods	
LTC William D. Evans	1988 - 1990	CSM Roy Anderson	
LTC Allen D. O'Rouke	1990 - 1993	CSM Bernard Kenemer	
LTC C. Stewart Rodeheaver	1993 - 1996	CSM Billy Duncan	
LTC Donald W. Venn	1996 - 1998	CSM Marvin Thomas	1995 - 2001
LTC Kenneth C. Roberts	1998 - 2002	SGM Jack L. McGill	2001 - 2001
LTC Kenneth C. Roberts	1998 - 2002	CSM Marvin Thomas	2001 - 2002
LTC John F. King	2002 - 2006	CSM David A. Knowles	2002 - 2005
LTC John F. King	2002 - 2006	CSM Grady A. Gayton	2005 - 2006
LTC Christopher Voso	2006 - 2007	CSM Joe M. Shubert	2006 - 2008
LTC Randall V. Simmons, Jr.	2007 - 2010	CSM Joseph E. Recker Jr.	2008 - 2010
LTC Matthew Saxton	2010 - 2012	CSM John Scott Rainwater	2010 - 2013
LTC Christopher Kemper	2012 - 2013	CSM Ronnie Perryman	2013 - 2013
LTC Brian W. Lassetter	2013 - 2014	CSM Larry Ray Robinson	2013 - 2013
LTC Jason S. Baker	2014 - 2016	CSM Flint E. Weathers	2014 – 2017
LTC Scott Jackels	2016 – 2019	CSM Jason D. York	2017 – 2019
COL Christopher Powell	2019 - 2021	CSM John Ballenger	2019 - 2021
LTC Robert M. Morris	2021 - 2023	CSM William P. Bookout	2021 - 2023
LTC Jace A. Walden	2023 - Present	CSM Timothy C. Deane	2023 - Present

=== Organization ===
- Headquarters and Headquarters Troop, located in Calhoun, Georgia
- Apache Troop (Cavalry), located in Cedartown, Georgia
- Blackfoot Troop (Cavalry), located in Canton, Georgia
- Cobra Troop (Infantry), located in Dalton, Georgia
- Dragoon Company (Forward Support), 148th Brigade Support Battalion, located in Calhoun, Georgia (attached)

== Lineage ==
Constituted 19 June 1959 in the Georgia Army National Guard as the 108th Armor, a parent regiment under the Combat Arms Regimental System

Organized 1 July 1959 from the following units to consist of the 1st Reconnaissance Squadron and the 2d, 3d, and 4th Medium Tank Battalions, elements of the 48th Armored Division:

48th Reconnaissance Battalion (organized in 1902 at Jackson) as the 1st Reconnaissance Squadron 163d Tank Battalion (organized in 1924 at Calhoun) as the 2d Medium Tank Battalion 162d Tank Battalion (organized in 1882 at Macon) as the 3d Medium Tank Battalion 190th Tank Battalion (organized in 1889 at Macon) as the 4th Medium Tank Battalion

Reorganized 1 May 1962 to consist of the 1st Reconnaissance Squadron and the 2d, 3d, and 4th Medium Tank Battalions, elements of the 48th Armored Division, and the 5th Medium Tank Battalion

Reorganized 16 April 1963 to consist of the 1st, 2d, 3d, 4th, and 5th Battalions, elements of the 48th Armored Division

Reorganized 1 January 1968 to consist of the 1st Battalion, an element of the 30th Infantry Division

Reorganized 1 December 1973 to consist of the 1st Battalion, an element of the 48th Infantry Brigade

Withdrawn 1 June 1989 from the Combat Arms Regimental System and reorganized under the United States Army Regimental System with headquarters at Calhoun

Ordered into active federal service 30 November 1990 at home stations; released from active federal service 27 March 1991 and reverted to state control

Ordered into active federal service 6 December 2004 – 3 January 2005 at home stations; released from active federal service 1 September – 1 October 2006 and reverted to state control

Redesignated 1 October 2005 as the 108th Armored Regiment

Consolidated 1 September 2007 with the 108th Cavalry Regiment (see ANNEX) and consolidated unit designated as the 108th Cavalry Regiment, to consist of the 1st Squadron, an element of the 48th Infantry Brigade Combat Team and the 2d Squadron, an element of the 256th Infantry Brigade Combat Team

Reorganized 1 September 2008 in the Georgia and Louisiana Army National Guard to consist of the 1st Squadron, an element of the 48th Infantry Brigade Combat Team, the 2d Squadron, an element of the 256th Infantry Brigade Combat Team, and the 3d Squadron

ANNEX

Constituted 2 September 1995 in the Georgia and Louisiana Army National Guard as the 108th Cavalry, a parent regiment under the United States Army Regimental System; concurrently organized from existing elements to consist of Troop A, an element of the 256th Infantry Brigade, and Troop E, an element of the 48th Infantry Brigade

(Troop E ordered into active federal service 6 December 2004 – 3 January 2005 at Griffin, Georgia)

Redesignated 1 October 2005 as the 108th Cavalry Regiment

Reorganized 1 September 2006 to consist of the 2d Squadron, an element of the 256th Infantry Brigade Combat Team, and Troop E, an element of the 48th Infantry Brigade

(Troop E released from active federal service 1 September – 1 October 2006 and reverted to state control)

== Honors ==
=== Campaign participation credit ===
The squadron has received participation credit for the following campaigns:

War on terrorism

Campaigns to be determined

World War II

Guadalcanal
New Guinea
Leyte
Luzon

=== Awards & Decorations ===
Ribbon	Award	Year	Notes
	Meritorious Unit Commendation	2009–2010	
	Presidential Unit Citation (Philippines)	1944-1945	Headquarters Company, streamer embroidered 17 OCTOBER 1944 TO 4 JULY 1945

== See also ==
- 108th Cavalry Regiment
- Order of the Spur
