= 560th Battlefield Surveillance Brigade (United States) =

560th Battlefield Surveillance Brigade (BfSB)
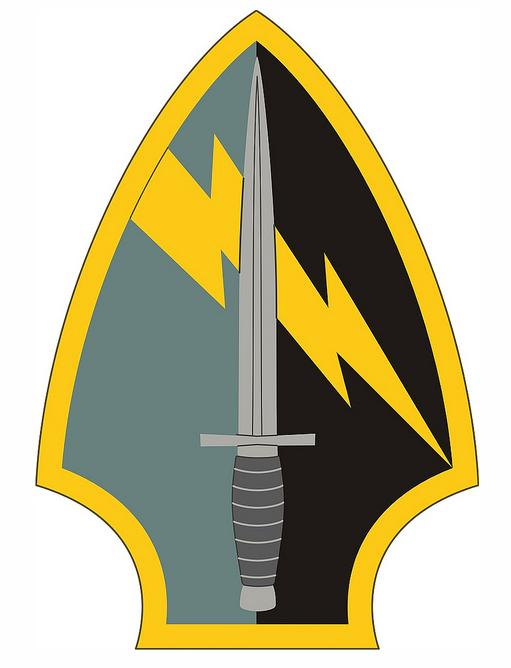
- 560th BfSB Shoulder Sleeve Insignia
- Active: October 2007 – 2016
- Disbanded: 2016
- Country: United States
- Branch: United States Army
- Type: United States Army National Guard
- Role: Battlefield surveillance
- Garrison/HQ: Cumming Regional Readiness Center (CRRC), Cumming, Georgia

Insignia
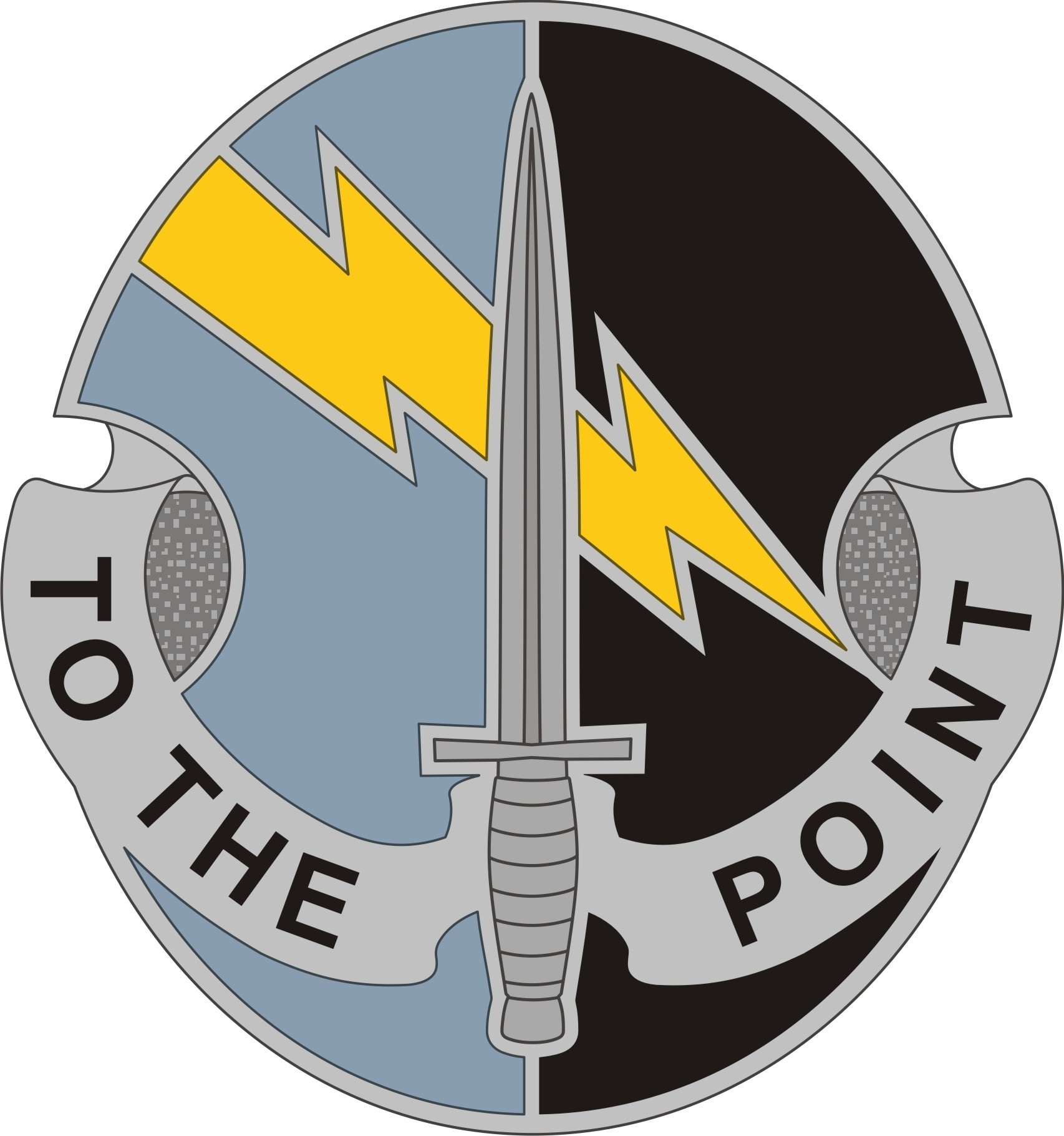
- Distinctive Unit Insignia

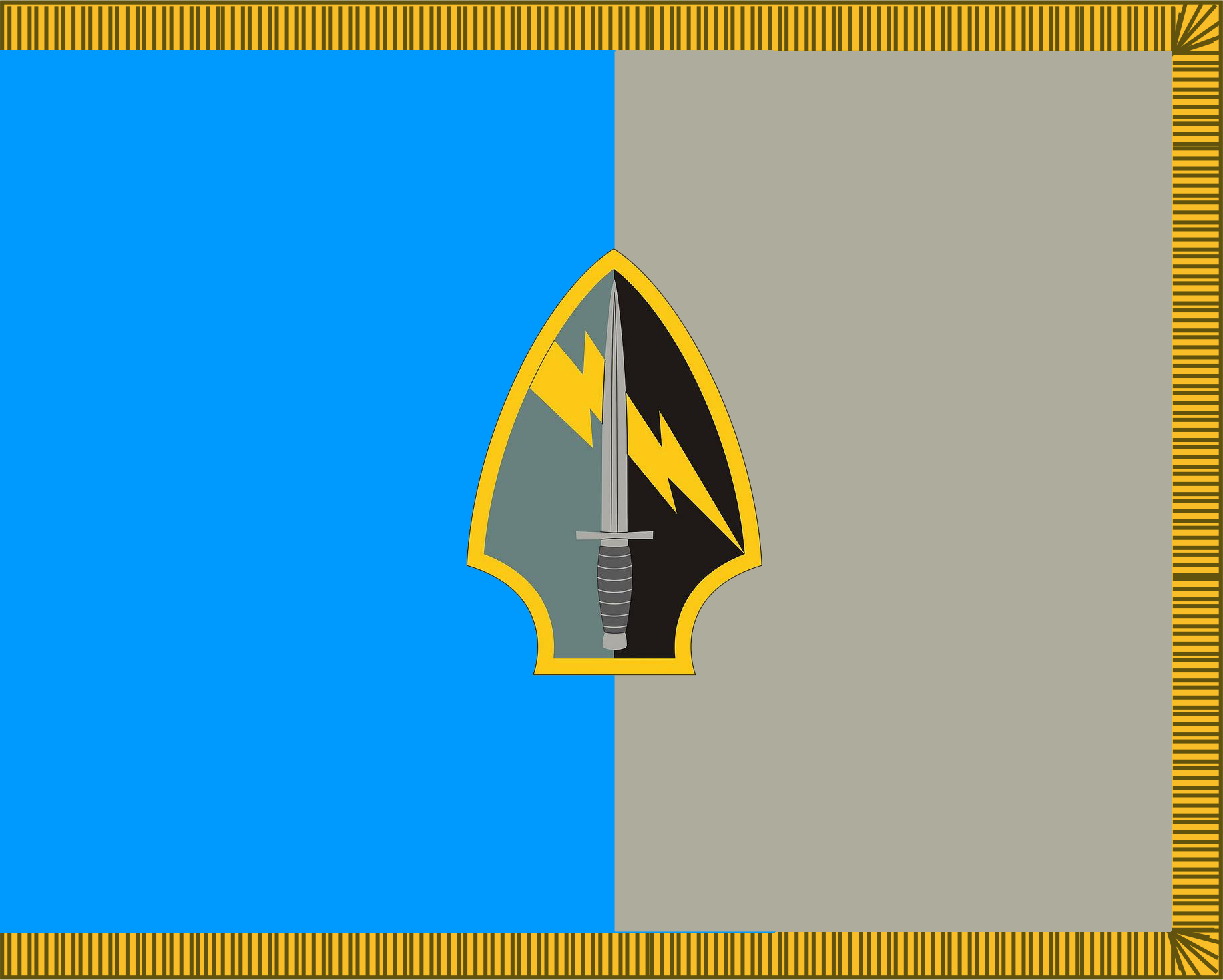
- 560th Battlefield Surveillance Brigade Flag

The 560th Battlefield Surveillance Brigade, based at the Cumming Regional Readiness Center in Cumming, Georgia, was a major command of the Georgia Army National Guard. It was organized as the first battlefield surveillance brigade in the Army National Guard.

== Overview ==
Since its inception on 1 October 2007, the brigade's mission has been to provide command and control of reconnaissance, surveillance, and intelligence operations in support of a division, corps or joint task force. The headquarters provides command, control and supervision of the tactical operations of the brigade and attached units, while the headquarters company provides unit administration and logistical support for the brigade staff sections. The 560th is authorized an estimated 1,100 soldiers with which to carry out that mission.

In October 2010, the 560th BFSB changed command for the first time since its formation, with Colonel Peter VanAmburgh relinquishing full-time command of the 560th to Colonel Thomas Carden, JFHQ's former military personnel officer.

An article in the June 15, 2016 edition of the Forsyth County News noted that the 506th BfSB was inactivated in a ceremony held on June 11 "at the Cumming Regional Readiness Center, where the unit had operated since the center opened in 2013. The 3d Battalion, 121st Infantry will now use the center."

== Commanders ==
2007-2010 Colonel Peter VanAmburgh

2010–2013 Colonel Thomas Carden

2013–2015 Colonel Raymond D. "Boz" Bossert Jr.

2015-2016 Colonel Jeffery Dickerson

== Accomplishments ==
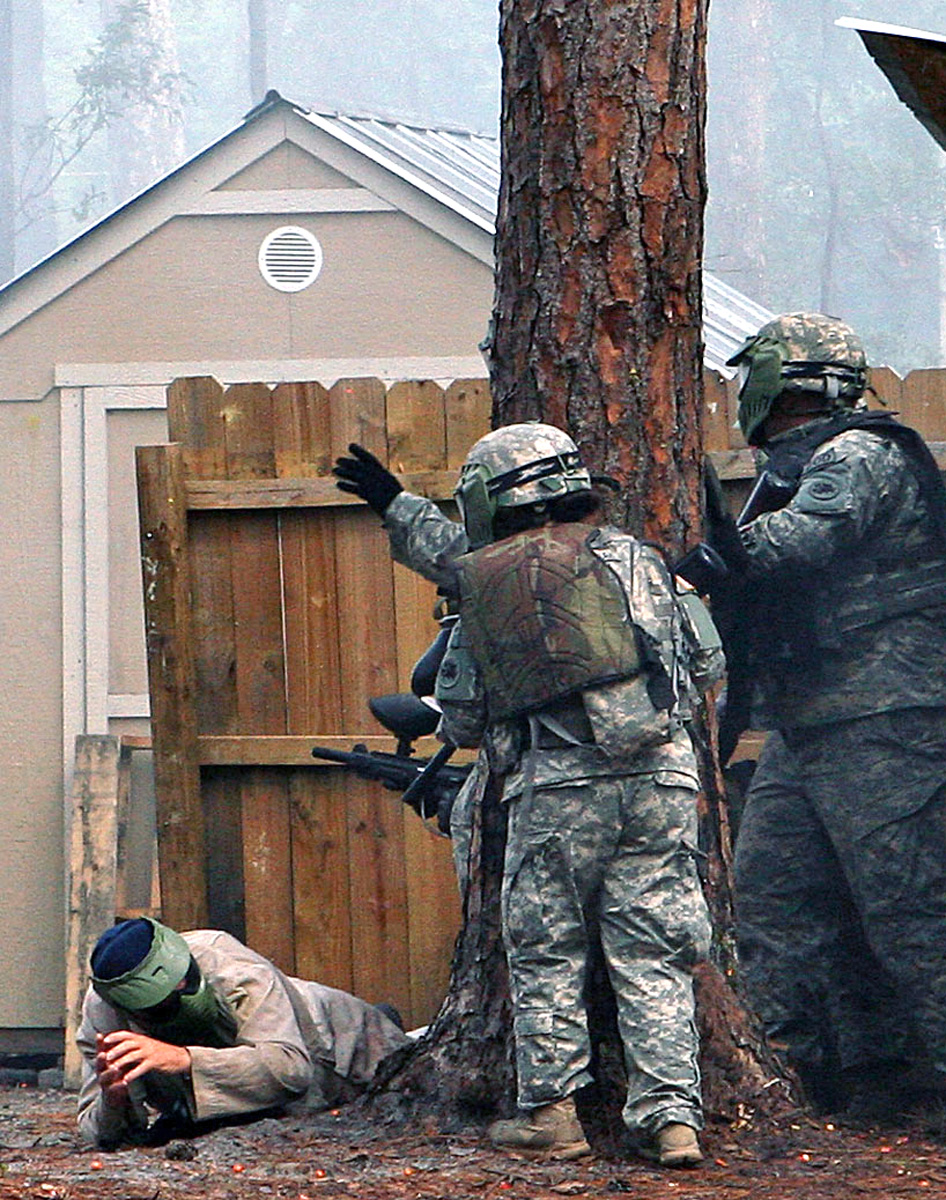
A Georgia State Defense Force role player is “captured” by Soldiers of Ellenwood's 560th Battlefield Surveillance Brigade during training at PTAE.

- October 2007 became the first BFSB to organize in the army
- In 2008 conducted first BFSB capability exercise (CAPEX0 at Fort Knox with 560th BFSB members leading doctrine development.
- In 2008 conducted the army's first bilateral task force operation using a BFSB - see Northwind 2008 in Japan http://www.globalsecurity.org/military/library/report/call/call_10-06.pdf
- in 2010 conducted the army's first joint and coalition task force operation using a BFSB - see Natural Fire 10 in Uganda
- In 2010 all units of the 560th BFSB were federally recognized
- Dedication of Blair Drop Zone at Catoosa Training Area in honor of 1st Sgt. John Blair
- Taught the first intelligence officer basic courses in Rwanda and the country of Georgia
- Conducted airborne operations every quarter
- Opened language training center at Clay National Guard Center in June, 2010 and taught 12 classes
- Conducted five iterations of pre-deployment training at Fort Stewart, GA, over a five-month period in preparation for overseas operations.
- The October and November 2011 XCTC rotation was the first exercise to conduct classified operations, to include a classified command post exercise (CPX).
- The October and November 2011 XCTC rotation was the first XCTC exercise to use active component observer controllers. This was also the first exercise where national guard, active duty, and reserve soldiers and military intelligence subject matter experts (SMEs) worked together to evaluate national guard soldiers in preparation for deployment.

== Exercises ==
The 560 BFSB has been involved in a number of exercises since its inception.

=== Northwind 2008 ===
During the period of 27 Feb–18 Mar 2008, the 560th BFSB sent a command and control (C2) cell to participate in U.S. Army Japan Exercise North Wind 2008. The operation was a bilateral field training exercise with active army and ARNG soldiers training with the Japanese Ground Self-Defense Force (JGSDF). The 560th BFSB exercised overall command and acted as the higher headquarters for the exercise and the brigade response cell for the staff exercise and collective training. The units involved included the 35th Combat Sustainment Support Battalion; 1-297th Infantry (Alaska ARNG); various ARNG soldiers from California, Florida, and Nebraska; and the 5th Regiment/9th DIV, JGSDF. North Wind 2008 was held in the Iwatesan training area in a remote and mountainous part of north Japan. This was the first known U.S. Army exercise to employ a BFSB as a higher headquarters and as part of a bilateral operation.

=== Natural Fire 2010 ===
In October 2009, the 560 BFSB participated in Exercise Natural Fire 10, a 13-day exercise oriented on conducting a humanitarian assistance and disaster relief exercise from 16 – 25 OCT 09 in the Republic of Uganda in order to enhance interoperability and the capability to respond to complex humanitarian emergencies. The exercise consisted of three events: a table top exercise (TTX) focused on pandemic influenza response, senior manager disaster response, and multinational involvement; a field training exercise (FTX) consisting of area security, entry control point, vehicle control point, convoy security, non lethal weapons, and weapons training; and a humanitarian civic action (HCA) focused on providing medical and dental assistance to the local population. During the exercise, the BFSB – as part of Task Force Kitgum – performed command and control operations in Kitgum, Uganda, in order to synchronize multinational forces conducting field training exercises and humanitarian civic assistance operations to enhance interoperability among participating forces. the 560 BFSB served as a joint and multinational task force headquarters of over 1000 army, navy, air force, marines and personnel from Burundi, Kenya, Rwanda, Tanzania and Uganda. This was the largest exercise of its kind in East Africa and the first test of a BFSB as a joint and multinational HQs.

=== Yama Sakura 57 ===
In 30 Nov - 13 Dec 2009, 560 BFSB soldiers traveled to Kumamoto, Japan, and Joint Base Lewis-McChord, to participate in Yama Sakura 59 – an annual bilateral joint training exercise intended to strengthen the working relationship and combat readiness of the two nations – alongside the Japan Self Defense Force and other U.S. military forces. The simulation-based command post exercise underscores the United States’ commitment to Japan's defense in accordance with a mutual defense treaty that was implemented in 1951 and revised in 1960. Yama Sakura was held first in 1982.

=== KFOR 13 ===
In April 2010, 221 MI mobilized and deployed 32 soldiers as the KFOR 13 Analytical Control Element (ACE) in support of Multinational Division - East located at Camp Bondsteel.

=== Mulberry Tree 2010 ===
In July and August 2010, a contingent of 100 soldiers from the 51st Scottish Brigade participated in 3-108 Cav's annual training at Camp Merrill and the Catoosa Training Area in the North Georgia Mountains. Training consisted of military operations in urban terrain, weapons familiarization and firing, drivers training, airborne operations and a wing exchange, and the Combat Tracker MTT.

=== Prickly Pear 2010 ===
In August and September 2010, 3-108 CAV participated in Operation Prickly Pear in Scotland, a 14-day training exchange between the 3-108 CAV (Task Force Recce) and the 51st Scottish Brigade, consisting of weapons training, live fire training, field craft, patrolling, and platoon and below maneuver training. Training was conducted in the Otterburn Training Area and the Kirkcudbright Training Area.

=== MDMP training ===
In May 2010 and December 2010, soldiers of the 560th worked specifically with the Ugandan army to set up a military decision making process (MDMP) training event. The idea was to familiarize the Ugandans with U.S. Army Light Infantry MDMP at the tactical battalion level. Uganda's military is highly interested in understanding how the American Army conducts the MDMP based on their operational lessons learned in both the Democratic Republic of the Congo and Somalia. The seminar assisted the process by establishing a basic understanding of roles and responsibilities of a light infantry battalion staff in the MDMP process, MDMP timelines and sequence of events, products or deliverables, and an understanding of how this product aids the field commander. This, in turn, set the foundation for a follow-on MDMP, which will familiarize the Ugandan army with the light infantry decision making process at the brigade level. Such training events also help the U.S. by enhancing awareness in the U.S. military of Ugandan infantry battalion practices, thereby improving interoperability. They also elicit lessons learned from the audience's peacekeeping operations.

=== KFOR 14 ===
In December 2010, 221 MI mobilized and deployed 32 soldiers as the KFOR 14 Analytical Control Element (ACE) in support of Multinational Division - East located at Camp Bondsteel.

=== Eurosatory 2010 ===
In June 2010, soldiers from the 560 BFSB participated as liaison officers for senior DOD personnel who attended the 2010 Eurosatory International Land, Airland, and Homeland Defense Exhibition, a U.S. Embassy supported Office of Defense Cooperation joint, combined, and multinational event held in Paris, France.

=== Yama Sakura 59 ===
In January 2011, 28 soldiers from the 560 BFSB traveled to Kumamoto, Japan to participate in Yama Sakura 59. Exercise Yama Sakura is an annual command post exercise (CPX) that continues to further strengthen the national security interests of Japan and the Asia-Pacific region. The largest bilateral engagement event USARJ facilitates and is the Japan Ground Self Defense Force's (JGSDF) most important bilateral exercise. Particular gains achieved in Yama Sakura are the opportunity to exchange ideas on force structure, doctrine, and equipment with counterparts through: practical and realistic warfighting training in command and staff activities through the use of simulations; and continued improvement of bilateral interoperability. Yama Sakura also contributes to the success of future CPXs by providing opportunities for training and observation by other JGSDF armies. The CPX also enhances the operational readiness of U.S. forces stationed in or destined for Japan.

=== Atlas Drop 11 ===
In April 2011, the 560th Battlefield Surveillance Brigade were part of a team of guardsmen and airmen who had been training and living together in the bush north of Soroti as part of Atlas Drop 11. The training conducted during the iteration of the annual exercise, sponsored by U.S. Army Africa, sought to increase the capability of both Uganda People's Defence Force and U.S. forces to resupply soldiers operating in remote areas. After completion, all military operations and training exercises were assessed to determine the successes and failures within the mission.

=== KFOR 15 ===
In August 2011, 221 MI mobilized and deployed soldiers as the KFOR 15 Analytical Control Element (ACE) in support of Multinational Division - East located at Camp Bondsteel.

=== KFOR 15 ===
In October 2011, 3-108 CAV mobilized and deployed soldiers as the KFOR 15 Tactical Maneuver Force in support of Multinational Division - East located at Camp Bondsteel and Camp Novo Selo.

=== GTST 2 ===
In January 2012, soldiers from the 560 BFSB deployed to the Republic of Georgia to support the Georgian training mission with maintenance, medical, and communications instructors. The soldiers were deployed for a period of six months.

=== Eurosatory 2012 ===
In June 2012, soldiers from the 560 BFSB participated as liaison officers for senior DOD personnel who attended the 2010 Eurosatory International Land, Airland, and Homeland Defense Exhibition, a U.S. Embassy supported Office of Defense Cooperation joint, combined, and multinational event held in Paris, France.

=== GTST 3 ===
In August 2012, soldiers from the 560 BFSB deployed to the Republic of Georgia to support the Georgian training mission with maintenance, medical, and communications instructors. Additionally, personnel served as the camp commandant. The soldiers were deployed for a period of 12 months.

== Units ==
- 221st Military Intelligence Battalion, Gillem Enclave, Forest Park, Georgia.
- 3rd Squadron, 108th Cavalry, Atlanta Readiness Center, Atlanta, Georgia.
- 165th Quartermaster Company, Clay National Guard Center, Marietta, Georgia.
- 230th Brigade Support Company, Cumming Regional Readiness Center, Cumming, Georgia.
- 420th Network Signal Company, Cumming Regional Readiness Center, Cumming, Georgia.
- Headquarters and Headquarters Company, 560 BFSB, Cumming Regional Readiness Center, Cumming, Georgia.
