= 256th Infantry Brigade Combat Team =

- Shoulder sleeve insignia
- Active: 13 February 1922–13 March 1946 (various designations); 18 December 1946–1 December 1967 (various designations); 1 December 1967–1977 (256th Infantry Bge.); 1977–1 September 2006 (256th Infantry Bge. Mech.); 1 September 2006–present (256th IBCT)
- Country: United States
- Allegiance: Louisiana Army National Guard
- Branch: United States Army National Guard
- Type: Infantry brigade combat team
- Role: Light Infantry
- Size: Approx. 4,400
- Part of: 28th Infantry Division (United States)
- Garrison/HQ: Lafayette, Louisiana
- Nicknames: Louisiana Brigade (special designation); Tiger Brigade
- Engagements: Operation Iraqi Freedom

Commanders
- Current commander: Lieutenant Colonel Lawrence P. Toups

Insignia
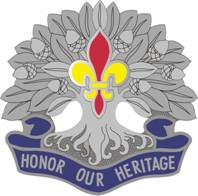
- 256th Infantry Brigade DUI

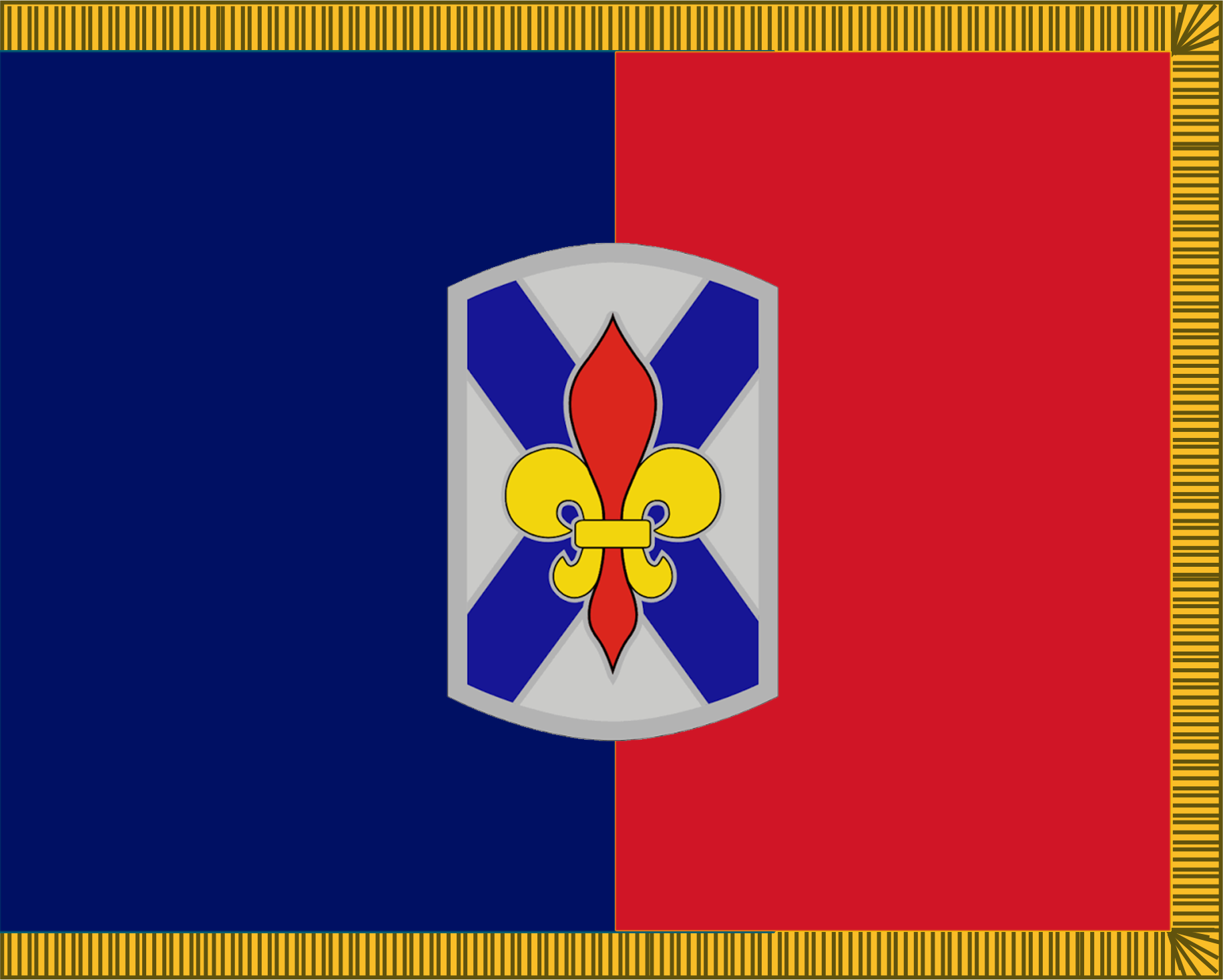
- 256th Infantry Brigade Flag

The 256th Infantry Brigade Combat Team ("Louisiana Brigade") is a modular infantry brigade combat team (IBCT) of the Louisiana Army National Guard. It is headquartered in Lafayette, Louisiana.

== History ==
The brigade was established in 1967, as part of an initiative by Secretary of Defense McNamara to reduce the number of National Guard divisions while increasing the number of brigades. The 256th replaced a brigade from the 39th Infantry Division in the Louisiana Army National Guard. The brigade was part of the Selected Reserve Force from 1967–1969, but the Selected Reserve Force was eliminated in an attempt to eliminate readiness differences between reserve component units. The brigade initially consisted of three infantry battalions and a "brigade base": a headquarters company; a reconnaissance troop; light tank and engineer companies; a 105 mm howitzer battalion; and a support battalion In 1975, the 256th was assigned as the 'round-out' brigade for the 5th Infantry Division as part of the expansion to a 24 division force. The brigade was mechanized in 1977, when the 1st Battalion, 156th Infantry was converted to the 1st Battalion, 156th Armor

The 256th Brigade was activated from November 1990 through May 1991, and conducted training at Fort Hood, TX, but never deployed. Some controversy arose over this activation of three round out brigades (the 256th; the 48th Infantry Brigade, Georgia Army National Guard; and the 155th Armor Brigade, Mississippi Army National Guard). None of the three brigades deployed before the end of combat in Operations Desert Storm. After the 5th Infantry Division was inactivated in 1992, the 256th Brigade served as the round out brigade for the 2nd Armored Division, until the end of the round out program in 1996.

With the end of the round out program, the 256th was selected as one of 15 Enhanced Brigades in the ARNG. The enhanced brigade program increased resources and training to allow the brigades to mobilize and deploy within 120 days.

=== Iraq War, 2004–05 ===
During train up for operations in the spring, summer and fall of 2004, the 256th Infantry Brigade was stationed at Fort Hood, Texas. The Brigade then completed a NTC rotation at Fort Irwin, California. The brigade spent another month training in the desert of Camp Buehring, Kuwait prior to moving into Iraq.

In 2004–2005, the 256th Brigade was sent to Iraq as part of OIF III (Operation Iraqi Freedom III, the third U.S. military rotation of forces into the area of operations). It served under the 1st Cavalry Division for its first five months and its last several months under the 3rd Infantry Division. During the first half of its combat tour in Iraq some of the brigade's subordinate units also served under the 10th Mountain Division. The brigade served in and around Baghdad, Iraq in a FOB known originally as FOB Victory until 15 June 2004. At this date FOB Victory's name was changed to FOB Liberty because on this date the Iraqi government officially "stood up". Upon the 256th's arrival at North Liberty it became Camp Tigerland. During operations in theater the brigade operated under the configuration of one-third heavy and two-thirds light.

Each battalion in the brigade had one company of heavy forces with M1A1 Abrams main battle tanks, M2A2 Bradley infantry fighting vehicles, or a mixture of the two. The other two-thirds operated primarily from HMMWV Gun Trucks that mounted either machine guns or automatic grenade launchers. The field artillery battalion was cannibalized to bring the infantry battalions up to full strength. The remainder of the Washington Artillery was attached to the 1st Cavalry Division base defense operations center (BDOC) under the command of the 103rd Field Artillery Brigade and the XVIII Airborne Corps. One howitzer platoon from the Washington Artillery was used to provide indirect fires in support of FOB Liberty. Additionally, Task Force Bengal was "stood up" as a liaison/training team to equip, train and assist the 40th Iraqi National Guard (ING) Brigade. TF Bengal consisted of soldiers and officers of the infantry, field artillery, and engineer units from the 256th Brigade as well as the 1st Battalion, 69th Infantry (The Fighting 69th) from New York City which had been attached for the deployment. Attached to the 69th Infantry was Delta 101, a company of tankers and scouts turned infantrymen from New York's 101st Cavalry Regiment. During the American Civil War, the 69th engaged the ancestral units of the 256th many times, so their attachment to each other for OIF provided a symbolic reconciliation 140 years after they fought each other to the death repeatedly from 1861 to 1865. On 21 February 2005, the 40th ING Brigade assumed authority for approximately 16 square kilometers in and around Al Akadhimian and began patrolling with approximately 2800 soldiers.

The 256th lost 32 soldiers in the Iraq War.

=== Hurricanes Katrina and Rita, 2005 ===
On 29 August 2005, Hurricane Katrina struck the gulf coast of Louisiana and Mississippi while most members of the 256th Infantry Brigade were still serving their final weeks of deployment in Iraq. Following the return of the brigade to Louisiana, a detachment immediately mobilized to New Orleans to aid law enforcement with rescue efforts. With the help of the Louisiana State Police, those efforts transitioned into a support mission for the New Orleans Police Department. Joint Task Force Gator was created to help combat the rise of looting and other crimes resulting from the loss of law enforcement officers in the New Orleans area. After three-and-a-half years of assisting local police and patrolling the city, the task force was released from duty on 28 February 2009.

=== Conversion to a Modular Infantry Brigade Combat Team ===
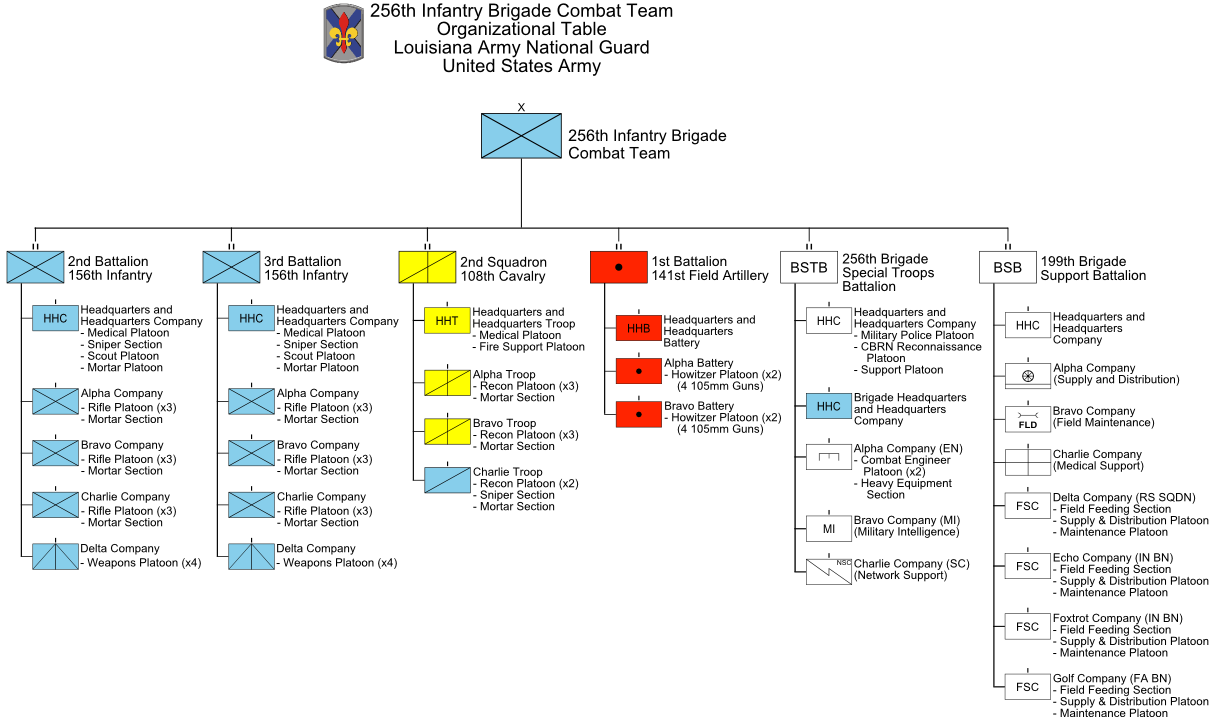
256th Infantry Brigade Combat Team order of battle, 2006–2016

On 1 September 2006, the 256th converted from a separate mechanized infantry brigade into a modular Infantry Brigade Combat Team. The 1st Battalion, 156th Armor inactivated and its personnel were used to form the 2d Squadron, 108th Cavalry. The 2d and 3rd Battalions, 156th Infantry converted from three mechanized infantry to infantry, and the 1st Battalion, 141st Field Artillery traded its 155 mm self-propelled howitzers for 105 mm towed howitzers. The brigade also formed a new battalion, the Special Troops Battalion (STB), 256th BCT, which provided a battalion headquarters for companies of engineers, signal and military intelligence.

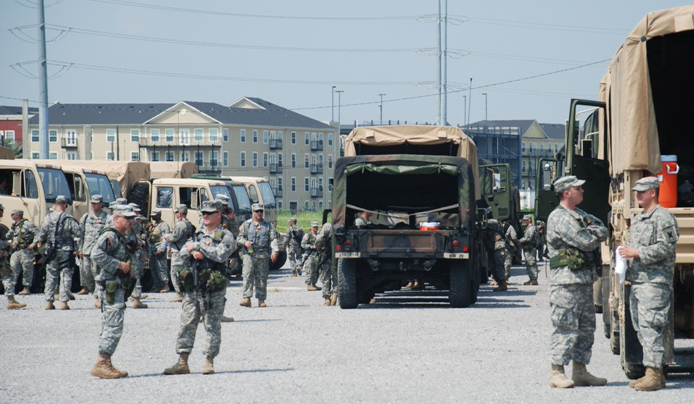
Members of the 256th IBCT stage their vehicles in Lot J next to the Ernest Morial Convention Center. These soldiers are activated for security missions in support of hurricane operations throughout the state.

=== Deployment to Iraq, 2010 ===
On Monday 19 May 2008, Louisiana's 256th BCT was alerted by the Defense Department that they might begin a second tour in Iraq starting in spring 2010. Brigades from the Texas, Pennsylvania, and Tennessee National Guards were also notified in the same press release. The press release specifically stated tours of duty in Iraq and Kuwait, and not Afghanistan. The notice of this deployment came within three years of the unit's return from their first tour of Iraq in 2004–05.

In February and March 2009, the 256th prepared for deployment to Iraq.

On 5 January 2010, the 256th BCT left for mobilization at Camp Shelby, Mississippi where soldiers trained for a variety of missions, such as PSD, FOB security, gate guard, convoy security, and more. In early March, they flew out of Gulf Coast Airport in Mississippi.

The brigade was divided into many different sections, being controlled by sustainment brigades and commands. The brigade commander, Col. Ball, did not command the entire brigade as subordinate units fell under other brigades. While select units returned home in August, the majority of brigade unit deployed back to home station in Louisiana in December 2010.

== Organization 2025 ==
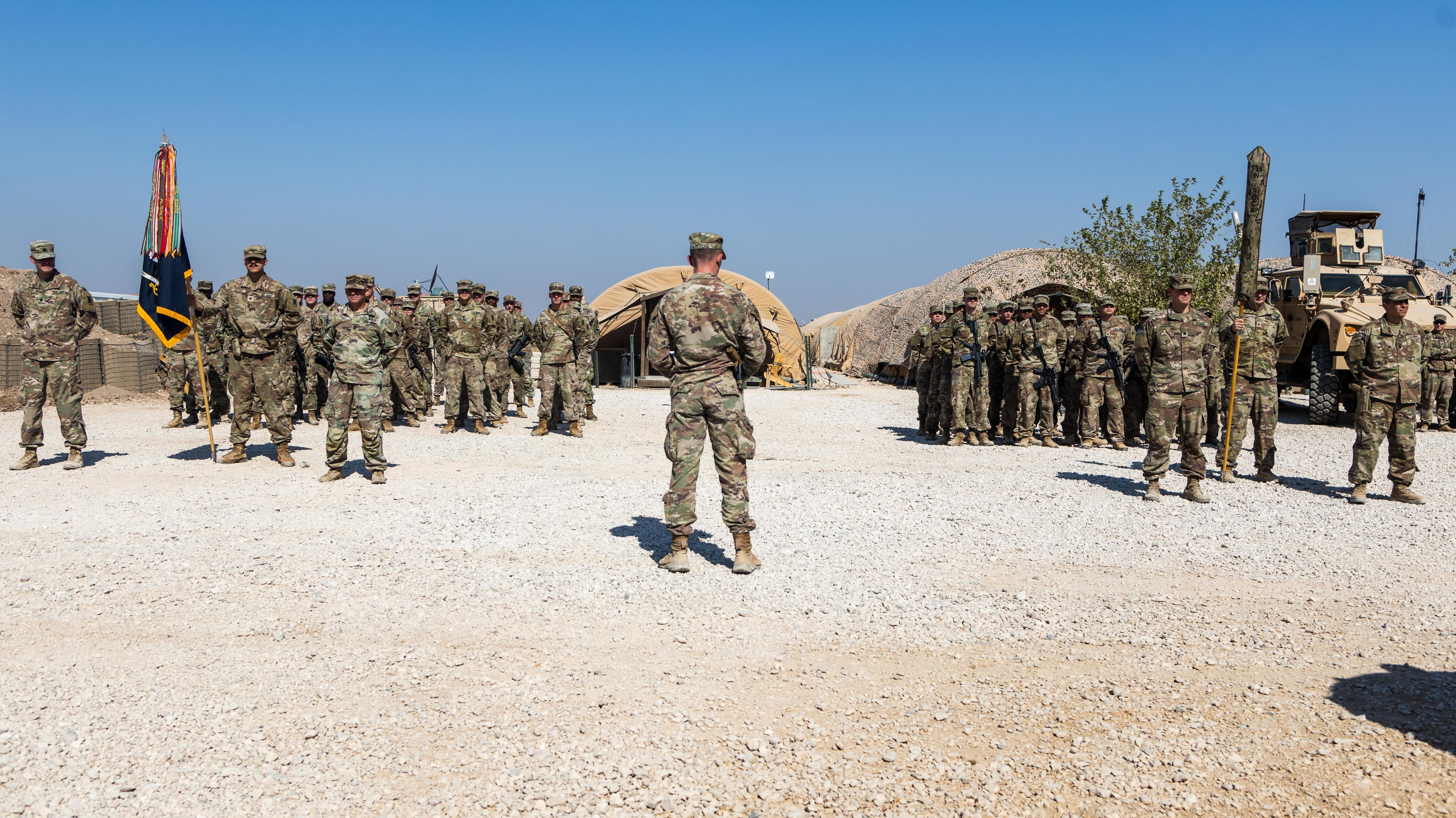
Task Force Warclub, 256th IBCT, and Task Force Rock, 1st Stryker Brigade Combat Team conduct a transfer of authority ceremony in Syria, September 19, 2021

- 256th Infantry Brigade Combat Team, in Lafayette
  - Headquarters and Headquarters Company, 256th Infantry Brigade Combat Team, in Lafayette
  - 2nd Squadron, 108th Cavalry Regiment, in Shreveport
    - Headquarters and Headquarters Troop, 2nd Squadron, 108th Cavalry Regiment, in Shreveport
    - Troop A, 2nd Squadron, 108th Cavalry Regiment, in Natchitoches
    - Troop B, 2nd Squadron, 108th Cavalry Regiment, in Shreveport
    - Troop C (Dismounted), 2nd Squadron, 108th Cavalry Regiment, in Coushatta
  - 2nd Battalion, 156th Infantry Regiment, in Abbeville
    - Headquarters and Headquarters Company, 2nd Battalion, 156th Infantry Regiment, in Abbeville
      - Detachment 1, Headquarters and Headquarters Company, 2nd Battalion, 156th Infantry Regiment, in Jeanerette
    - Company A, 2nd Battalion, 156th Infantry Regiment, in Breaux Bridge
      - Detachment 1, Company A, 2nd Battalion, 156th Infantry Regiment, in Plaquemine
    - Company B, 2nd Battalion, 156th Infantry Regiment, in New Iberia
      - Detachment 1, Company B, 2nd Battalion, 156th Infantry Regiment, in Franklin
    - Company C, 2nd Battalion, 156th Infantry Regiment, in Houma
    - Company D (Weapons), 2nd Battalion, 156th Infantry Regiment, in Thibodaux
  - 3rd Battalion, 156th Infantry Regiment, in Lake Charles
    - Headquarters and Headquarters Company, 3rd Battalion, 156th Infantry Regiment, in Lake Charles
      - Detachment 1, Headquarters and Headquarters Company, 3rd Battalion, 156th Infantry Regiment, in DeQuincy
    - Company A, 3rd Battalion, 156th Infantry Regiment, at Fort Polk
      - Detachment 1, Company A, 3rd Battalion, 156th Infantry Regiment, in DeRidder
    - Company B, 3rd Battalion, 156th Infantry Regiment, in Pineville
      - Detachment 1, Company B, 3rd Battalion, 156th Infantry Regiment, in Baton Rouge
    - Company C, 3rd Battalion, 156th Infantry Regiment, in Crowley
      - Detachment 1, Company C, 3rd Battalion, 156th Infantry Regiment, in New Orleans
    - Company D (Weapons), 3rd Battalion, 156th Infantry Regiment, in Opelousas
  - 1st Battalion, 173rd Infantry Regiment, in Enterprise (AL) (Alabama Army National Guard)
    - Headquarters and Headquarters Company, 1st Battalion, 173rd Infantry Regiment, in Enterprise (AL)
    - Company A, 1st Battalion, 173rd Infantry Regiment, in Geneva (AL)
    - Company B, 1st Battalion, 173rd Infantry Regiment, in Valley (AL)
    - Company C, 1st Battalion, 173rd Infantry Regiment, in Foley (AL)
    - Company D (Weapons), 1st Battalion, 173rd Infantry Regiment, in Florala (AL)
  - 1st Battalion, 141st Field Artillery Regiment, in New Orleans
    - Headquarters and Headquarters Battery, 1st Battalion, 141st Field Artillery Regiment, in New Orleans
    - Battery A, 1st Battalion, 141st Field Artillery Regiment, in New Orleans
    - Battery B, 1st Battalion, 141st Field Artillery Regiment, in New Orleans
    - Battery C, 1st Battalion, 141st Field Artillery Regiment, in New Orleans
  - 769th Brigade Engineer Battalion, in Baton Rouge
    - Headquarters and Headquarters Company, 769th Brigade Engineer Battalion, in Baton Rouge
    - Company A (Combat Engineer), 769th Brigade Engineer Battalion, in New Roads
    - Company B (Combat Engineer), 769th Brigade Engineer Battalion, in Napoleonville
    - Company C (Signal), 769th Brigade Engineer Battalion, in Lafayette
    - Company D (Military Intelligence), 769th Brigade Engineer Battalion, in Lafayette
      - Detachment 1, Company D (Military Intelligence), 769th Brigade Engineer Battalion, at Fort Johnson (RQ-28A UAV)
  - 199th Brigade Support Battalion, in Alexandria
    - Headquarters and Headquarters Company, 199th Brigade Support Battalion, in Alexandria
    - Company A (Distribution), 199th Brigade Support Battalion, in Colfax
    - Company B (Maintenance), 199th Brigade Support Battalion, in Alexandria
    - Company C (Medical), 199th Brigade Support Battalion, in St. Martinville
    - Company D (Forward Support), 199th Brigade Support Battalion, in Shreveport — attached to 2nd Squadron, 108th Cavalry Regiment
    - Company E (Forward Support), 199th Brigade Support Battalion, in Baton Rouge — attached to 769th Brigade Engineer Battalion
    - Company F (Forward Support), 199th Brigade Support Battalion, in New Orleans — attached to 1st Battalion, 141st Field Artillery Regiment
    - Company G (Forward Support), 199th Brigade Support Battalion, in Jeanerette — attached to 2nd Battalion, 156th Infantry Regiment
    - Company H (Forward Support), 199th Brigade Support Battalion, in DeQuincy — attached to 3rd Battalion, 156th Infantry Regiment
    - Company I (Forward Support), 199th Brigade Support Battalion, in Enterprise (AL) — attached to 1st Battalion, 173rd Infantry Regiment (Alabama Army National Guard)

== Equipment ==
=== Training sites ===
- Louisiana National Guard Training Center Pineville, Louisiana
- Camp Minden, Louisiana
- Barksdale AFB, Bossier City, Louisiana in Bossier Parish
- Camp Livingston, Louisiana
- Fort Johnson near Leesville, Louisiana in Vernon Parish
- Alexandria International Airport, the former England Air Force Base
- Camp Shelby, Mississippi
- Gillis Long Center in Carville, Louisiana, Iberville Parish
- Camp Villere near Slidell, Louisiana in St. Tammany Parish

=== Weapons ===
- M120 120mm Mortar
- M252 81mm Mortar
- M224 60mm Mortar
- M17 Pistol
- M4 Carbine 5.56 mm
- M320 grenade launcher
- M240 Machine Gun 7.62mm
- TOW Anti-tank guided missile with a 3.75 km range
- FGM-148 Javelin (ATGM)
- FIM-92 Stinger anti-aircraft missile
- M249 Squad Automatic Weapon 5.56 mm
- M2 Browning machine gun 12.7mm/.50 caliber
- M119 howitzer 105 mm
- Mk 19 grenade launcher 40mm
- M24 Sniper Weapon System
- M107 12.7mm Long Range Sniper Rifle

=== Vehicles ===
- HMMWV
- FMTV
- Gun Truck
- Shadow TUAS
- Heavy Expanded Mobility Tactical Truck
- Mine Resistant Ambush Protected Vehicle
- LHS Load handling system
- LMTV Light Medium Tactical Vehicle

== See also ==
- Yasser Salihee
