= 108th Cavalry Regiment =

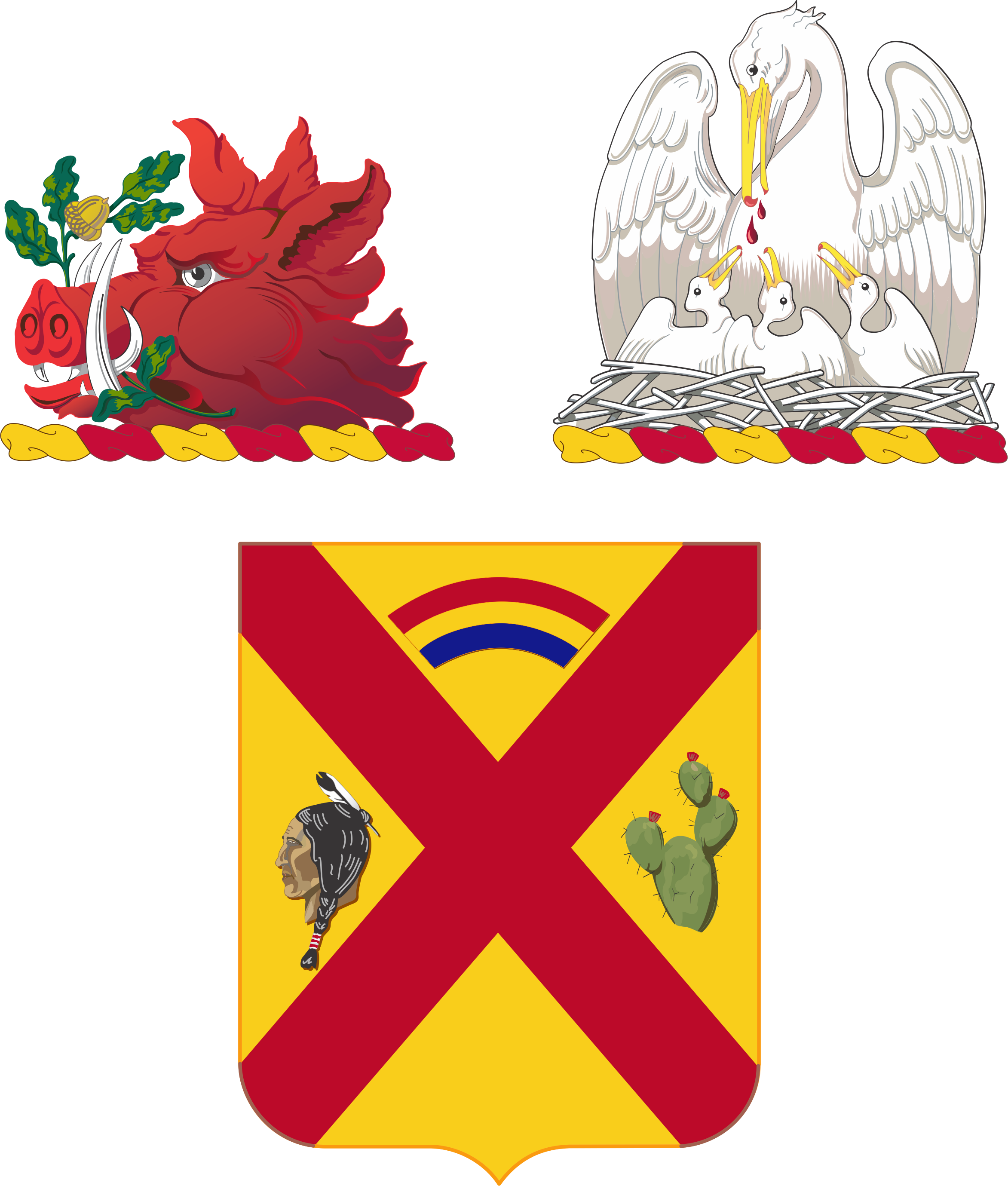
- coat of arms
- Active: 10 November 1923 to present
- Country: United States
- Branch: United States Army
- Type: Cavalry
- Role: Reconnaissance and surveillance
- Size: Regiment
- Nicknames: Roughriders {1st Squadron} Geronimo {2nd Squadron} Renegades {3rd Squadron}
- Patron: Saint George
- Motto: "Come What Will"
- Colors: Yellow
- Decorations: None
- Battle honours: Civil War {CSA} Indian Wars; 1916 Mexican Expedition; World War I World War II; Iraqi Campaign (OIF III, OIF IX, Operation New Dawn) OIR 2021

Insignia
- Distinctive Unit Insignia

The 108th Cavalry Regiment is a cavalry regiment of the Georgia and Louisiana Army National Guards of the United States Army.

== Lineage ==
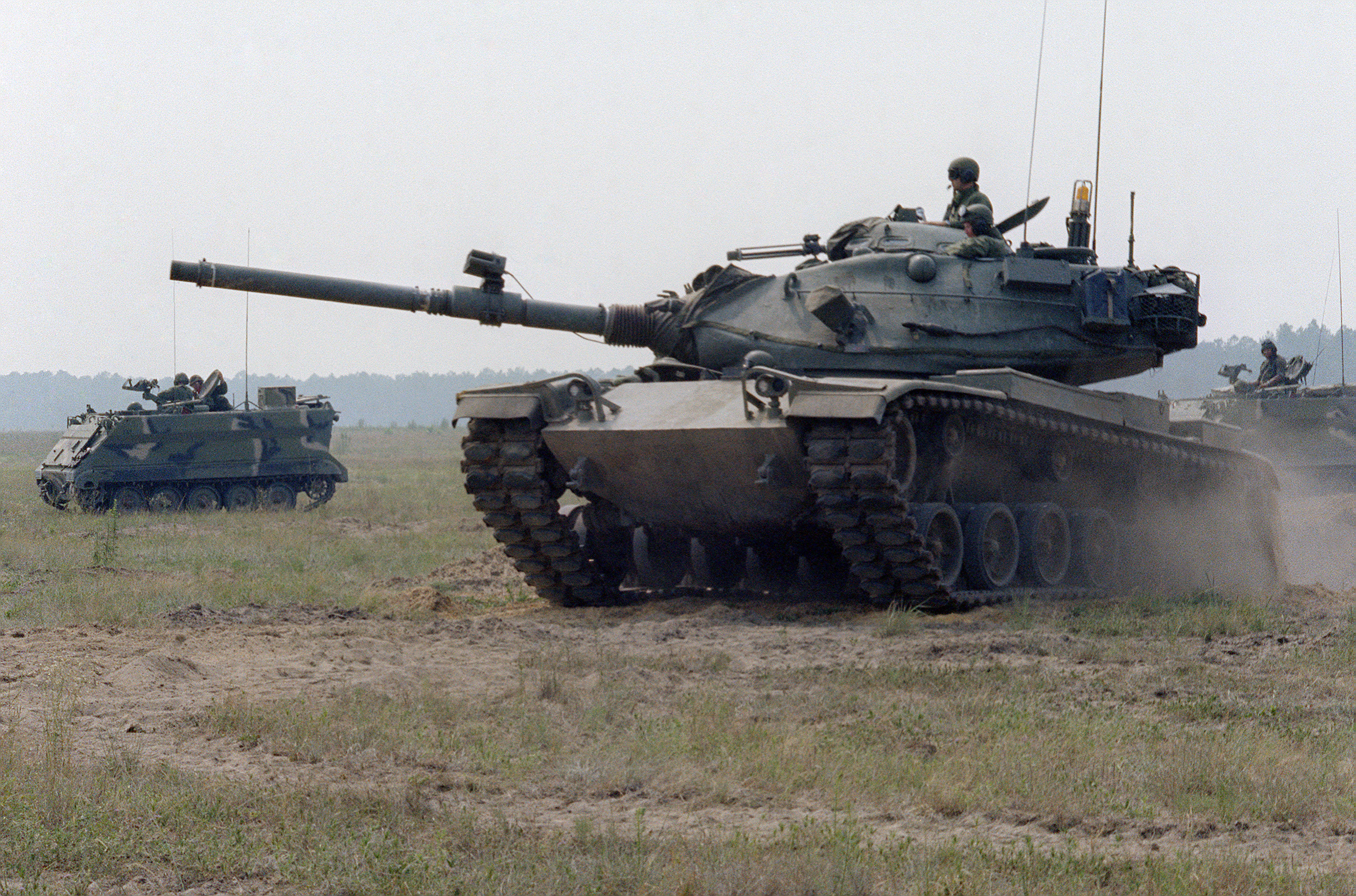
An M60A3 main battle tank (foreground) and an M113A1 armored personnel carrier (left background) from the 108th Armored Regiment, Georgia National Guard, move out to attack opposing forces. The training Exercise COMPANY TEAM DEFENSE 1983 is being conducted in preparation for annual training to be held at Fort Irwin, California.

The 108th Cavalry Regiment was constituted in the National Guard on 1 June 1921, allotted to the states of Georgia and Louisiana, and assigned to the 22nd Cavalry Division. It was organized from new and existing units. The 1st Squadron was organized on 6 March 1922 at Atlanta, Georgia, the 2nd Squadron was organized on 21 June 1922 at Jennings, Louisiana. The regimental headquarters was organized on 10 November 1923 and federally recognized at New Orleans, Louisiana. The regiment was relieved from the 22nd Cavalry Division on 19 February 1927 and assigned to the 23rd Cavalry Division. The regiment was reorganized on 15 March 1929 as a three-squadron regiment, with a new 3rd Squadron organized at New Orleans. The Headquarters was withdrawn from the state of Louisiana on 29 June 1936, allotted to the state of Georgia, and organized at Hinesville, Georgia. The regiment, less the Georgia elements, was called up to perform relief and guard duties associated with the flooding of the Mississippi River from 26 April to 19 June 1927. It conducted summer training most years at Fort Oglethorpe, Georgia, from 1921 to 1939, and at Camp McClellan, Alabama, in 1924, 1926–28, and 1933. The designated mobilization training station was Fort Oglethorpe. The 108th Cavalry Regiment was relieved from the 23rd Cavalry Division on 1 October 1940 and disbanded. Regimental elements used to form the 101st and 105th Separate Battalions, Coast Artillery (Antiaircraft).

- Headquarters (subsequently Headquarters and Headquarters Troop), organized at New Orleans and federally recognized 10 November 1923.
- Service Troop organized at New Orleans and federally recognized 3 August 1924.
- Headquarters, 1st Squadron (originally organized 2 December 1907 as Headquarters, 2nd Squadron, Georgia Cavalry
  - Mustered into federal service 16 July 1916 for Mexican border service and stationed at El Paso, Texas
  - Consolidated with 106th Train Headquarters and Military Police, 31st Division, 23 October 1917
  - demobilized 14 January 1919 at Camp Gordon, Georgia
  - Reorganized at Atlanta and federally recognized 6 March 1922
- Troop A, 1st Separate Squadron, Georgia Cavalry at Savannah
  - Organized 1 October 1785) as Georgia Hussars
  - Mustered into Confederate States Army in 1861 as Company E, 6th Virginia Cavalry
  - Transferred to Jeff Davis Legion in December 1861 as Company F and served in the Cavalry Corps, Army of Northern Virginia
  - Surrendered 26 April 1865 with Johnston's command at Greensboro, North Carolina
  - Reorganized 6 May 1872 as Georgia Hussars
  - Redesignated 11 November 1889 as Troop A, 1st Georgia Cavalry
  - Redesignated 2 December 1907 as Troop A, 1st Squadron, Georgia Cavalry
  - Redesignated 19 September 1910 as Troop A, 2nd Squadron, Georgia Cavalry
  - Redesignated 23 September 1910 as Troop A, Georgia Cavalry, unassigned
  - Attached to 2d Squadron, Georgia Cavalry, 12 March 1912
  - Mustered into federal service 16 July 1916 and stationed at El Paso, Texas
  - Redesignated 25 September 1917 as Headquarters Troop, 31st Division; demobilized 14 January 1919 at Camp Gordon, Georgia
  - Reorganized and federally recognized 13 September 1920 as Troop A, 1st Separate Squadron, Georgia Cavalry
  - Redesignated Troop A, 2 November 1921
- Troop B, 1st Separate Squadron, Georgia Cavalry at Hinesville organized 12 September 1788 as Liberty Independent Troop
  - Mustered into Confederate States Army 20 January 1863 as Troop G, 5th Georgia Cavalry, Wheeler's Corps, Army of Tennessee and disbanded 10 April 1865
  - Reorganized 13 July 1872 as Liberty Independent Troop
  - Redesignated 11 November 1889 as Troop B, 1st Battalion, Georgia Cavalry
  - Redesignated 2 December 1907 as Troop B, Troop B, 1st Squadron, Georgia Cavalry
  - Redesignated 19 September 1910 as Troop B, 2d Squadron, Georgia Cavalry
  - Mustered into federal service 16 July 1916 for Mexican border duty and stationed at El Paso, Texas
  - Redesignated 20 October 1917 as Wire Company, 106th Field Signal Battalion, 31st Division
  - Demobilized 10 May 1919 at Camp Gordon, Georgia
  - Reorganized and federally recognized 17 September 1920 as Troop B, 1st Separate Squadron
  - Redesignated Troop B, 2 November 1921

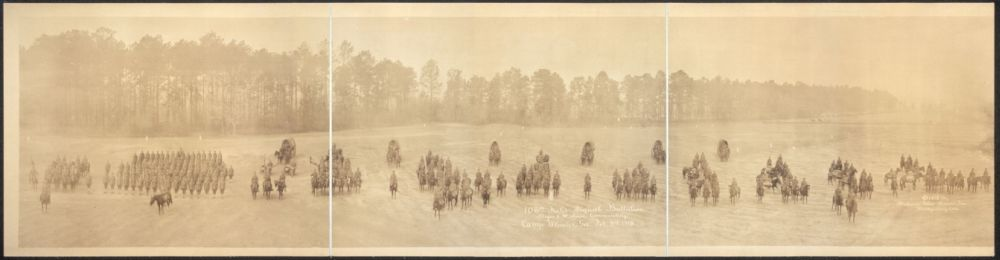
106th Field Signal Battalion, Major C.W. Saso, commanding, Camp Wheeler, Ga., 9 February 1918

- Troop C, 1st Separate Squadron, Georgia Cavalry at Atlanta, Georgia
  - organized 31 March 1883 as Governor’s Horse Guard
  - redesignated 25 January 1890 as Troop B, 1st Battalion, Georgia Cavalry
  - redesignated 3 October 1899 as Troop L, 1st Georgia Cavalry
  - redesignated Troop L, 2d Squadron, Georgia Cavalry, 3 December 1907
  - mustered into federal service 16 July 1916 and stationed at El Paso
  - redesignated 20 October 1917 as 106th Train Headquarters and Military Police, 31st Division
  - demobilized 14 January 1919 at Camp Gordon, Georgia
  - reorganized and federally recognized 31 May 1921 as Troop C, 1st Separate Squadron, Georgia Cavalry)
  - redesignated Troop C, 2 November 1921
- Headquarters, 1st Squadron, 108th Cavalry at Jennings Louisiana
  - organized and federally recognized 4 May 1922)
  - redesignated Headquarters, 2d Squadron, 21 June 1922 Troop A, 108th Cavalry at Bogalusa, Louisiana
  - organized 22 January 1913 as Company G, 1st Regiment, Louisiana Infantry
  - mustered into federal service 25 June 1916 at Camp Stafford, Louisiana, for Mexican border duty
  - mustered out 25 September 1916 at Camp Stafford
  - mustered into federal service 10 April 1917 at Camp Nicholls, Louisiana
  - broken up 29 October 1917 and personnel assigned to Companies E, F, G and H, 154th Infantry and Company D, 1 14th Engineers, 39th Division
  - demobilized 23 January 1919 at Camp Beauregard, Louisiana
  - reorganized and federally recognized 27 November 1920 as Troop A, Louisiana Cavalry
  - redesignated 24 April 1922 as Troop A, 108th Cavalry)
  - redesignated Troop E, 108th Cavalry, 21 June 1922.
- Troop B, 108th Cavalry at Jennings, Louisiana
  - organized 25 November 1902 as 3d Troop, Louisiana Cavalry and attached to 1st Battalion, Louisiana Infantry
  - assigned to 1st Squadron, Louisiana Cavalry 6 December 1904
  - redesignated 25 April 1908 as Troop B, 1st Squadron, Louisiana Cavalry
  - redesignated 31 December 1914 as 2d Separate Troop, Louisiana Cavalry
  - mustered into federal service 28 June 1916 at Camp Stafford for Mexican border duty and stationed at Donna, Texas
  - redesignated 1st Separate Troop, Louisiana Cavalry, 6 July 1916, mustered out 6 October 1916 at Camp Stafford
  - Mustered into federal service 1 April 1917 at Camp Nicholls
  - Redesignated Headquarters Troop, 42d Division in August 1917
  - demobilized 10 May 1919 at Camp Dix, New Jersey
  - reorganized and federally recognized 2 August 1921 as Troop B, 1st Louisiana Cavalry
  - redesignated 24 April 1922 as Troop B 108th Cavalry), redesignated Troop F, 10 August 1922
- Troop C, 108th Cavalry at Franklinton, Louisiana (organized and federally recognized 17 December 1921), redesignated Troop G, 21 June 1922. Reorganized 15 March 1929 as a three-squadron regiment with elements at locations as follows:
  - Regimental Headquarters reorganized at Hinesville, Georgia.
    - 1st Squadron reorganized with Headquarters and Troop B at Hinesville and Troop A at Savannah, Georgia.
    - 2nd Squadron reorganized with Headquarters and Troop E at Bogalusa and Troop F at Franklinton, Louisiana.
    - 3rd Squadron organized and federally recognized 15 March 1929 with Headquarters and Troop I at New Orleans and Troop K at Jennings, Louisiana.
  - Relieved from the 23rd Cavalry Division (United States) and broken up in October 1940 with elements consolidated, converted and redesignated as follows:
    - Headquarters Troop at New Orleans redesignated 6 October 1940 as Headquarters Battery, 105th Separate Battalion, Coast Artillery Antiaircraft).
    - Machine Gun Troop at Atlanta redesignated 12 October 1940 as Battery C, 101st Separate Battalion, Coast Artillery (Antiaircraft).
    - Headquarters, First Squadron at Hinesville redesignated 12 October 1940 as Headquarters, 101st Separate Battalion, Coast Artillery (Antiaircraft).
    - Troop A at Savannah redesignated 12 October 1940 as Battery A, 101st Separate Battalion, Coast Artillery (Antiaircraft).
    - Troop B at Hinesville redesignated 12 October 1940 as Battery B, 101st Separate Battalion, Coast Artillery (Antiaircraft).
    - Headquarters, 2d Squadron at New Orleans consolidated with Headquarters, 23d Cavalry Division (organized and federally recognized 18 October 1939) and Headquarters, 55th Cavalry Brigade (organized and federally recognized 20 May 1936), reorganized and redesignated 6 October 1940 as Headquarters, 105th Separate Battalion, Coast Artillery (Antiaircraft).
    - Troop E at Bogalusa redesignated 6 October 1940 as Battery C, 105th Separate Battalion, Coast Artillery (Antiaircraft).
    - Troop F at Franklinton redesignated 6 October 1940 as Battery D, 105th Separate Battalion, Coast Artillery (Antiaircraft).
    - Headquarters, 3d Squadron at New Orleans consolidated 6 October 1940 with Headquarters, 105th Separate Battalion, Coast Artillery (Antiaircraft).
    - Troop I at New Orleans redesignated 6 October 1940 as Battery A, 105th Separate Battalion, Coast Artillery (Antiaircraft).
    - Troop K at Jennings redesignated 6 October 1940 as Antitank Company, 156th Infantry
    - Medical Department Detachment at New Orleans reorganized 12 October 1940 to form Medical Department Detachments, 101st and 105th Separate Battalions, Coast Artillery (Antiaircraft).

2nd Squadron Reconnaissance Surveillance and Target Acquisition (RSTA), 108th Cavalry Regiment (LA ARNG) was mobilized on 5 January 2010 for deployment as part of the 256th IBCT.

== Coat of arms ==
The 108th Cavalry Regiment has its own coat of arms approved by the United States Army Institute of Heraldry on 3 July 1934, composed of the following:

- Shield: Consists of a shield composed of a yellow a gules (for the Cavalry), red saltire (denoting Confederate Service), a three color (red, yellow, blue) rainbow at the honour point (for service with the 42nd Infantry Division during World War I), a prickly pear cactus at the charge (for Mexican border service), and an Indian's head in profile with one feather in a top-knot (for Indian Wars).
- Crest: The regiments and separate battalions of the Georgia and Louisiana National Guard are placed from dexter to sinister in the order in which the states were admitted to the Union:
  - Georgia: A boar's head on a wreath of the colors, with an oak branch vert fructed in its mouth
  - Louisiana: A pelican in her piety affronte with three young in its nest on a wreath of the colors ], argent armed and vulned proper
- Distinctive Unit Insignia: The Distinctive Unit Insignia is a combination of the shield and the motto of the coat of arms.

== Campaign streamers ==
- Civil War (Confederate service)
  - Peninsula Campaign
  - Fredericksburg
  - Gettysburg campaign
  - Battle of Culpeper Court House
  - Overland Campaign
  - Valley Campaigns of 1864
  - Appomattox Campaign
  - Atlanta campaign
  - Carolinas 1865
- World War I
  - Streamer without inscription
- World War II
  - Operation Torch
  - Tunisia campaign
  - Operation Husky
  - Operation Avalanche
  - North Apennines
  - Operation Overlord
  - Battle of Hurtgen Forest
  - Ardennes-Alsace
  - Central European Campaign/Austria

== Present day ==
- 1st Squadron, 108th Cavalry Regiment is the reconnaissance and surveillance element of the 48th Infantry Brigade Combat Team, Georgia Army National Guard.
- 2nd Squadron, 108th Cavalry Regiment is the reconnaissance and surveillance element of the 256th Infantry Brigade Combat Team, Louisiana Army National Guard. (The squadron was formed using the personnel and equipment of the 1st Battalion, 156th Armor Regiment headquartered in Shreveport with units posted in Natchitoches and Coushatta Louisiana.
- 3rd Squadron, 108th Cavalry Regiment was the reconnaissance and surveillance element of the 560th Battlefield Surveillance Brigade, Georgia Army National Guard. Note:The R&S Squadron of a battlefield surveillance brigade is organized differently than an RSTA Cavalry Squadron of a brigade combat team. 3–108th Cavalry (R&S) was last headquartered in Atlanta, Georgia. Personnel from this Squadron were transitioned to reconstitute the 3rd Battalion, 121st Infantry Regiment in 2016 shifting headquarters to Cumming Regional Readiness Center. Notably, Troop C (LRS) which was formed from the personnel and equipment of Company H (LRS), 121st Infantry, was not perpetuated, removing the last "Airborne" designated unit from the Georgia Army National Guard.

The 3rd Squadron, 108th Cavalry Regiment was inactivated in a ceremony on 5 March 2016 at the Atlanta Readiness Center, with personnel being used to form the 3d Battalion, 121st Infantry Regiment, 48th BCT.

== Commanders ==
- Lt. General Joseph Bacon Fraser

2–108th Cavalry Squadron Commanders

- LTC Scott Adams 2006–2008
- LTC Will Rachal 2008–2012
- LTC Jonathan Lloyd 2012–2013
- LTC C. Lance Magee 2013–2017
- LTC Jeremy Cook 2017–2019
- LTC Stephen J. Luebbert 2019–2021
- LTC Michael Poche 2021-2023
- LTC Joseph Carey 2023-2024
- LTC John Waller 2024-present

== See also ==
- Fiddler's Green
- Order of the Spur
- The Spur Ride
- Combat Cavalry Badge
