= 48th Mobile Brigade Combat Team =

- Shoulder sleeve insignia of the 48th IBCT
- Active: 23 April 1825–31 May 1847 (Georgia Vol. Militia); 11 April 1872–2 July 1916 (Georgia Volunteers); 2 July 1916–28 November 1922 (various designations); 28 November 1922–17 November 1945 (59th Infantry Bge., 30th Div., various designations); 12 December 1946–1 November 1955 (48th Infantry Div.); 1 November 1955–1 January 1968 (48th Armored Div.); 1 January 1968–1 December 1973 (3d Bge., 30th Infantry Div.); 1 December 1973–1 September 2007 (48th Infantry Bge.); 1 September 2007–present (48th IBCT)
- Country: United States
- Allegiance: Georgia
- Branch: U.S. Army
- Type: Infantry
- Size: Brigade
- Part of: 29th Infantry Division (United States)
- Garrison/HQ: Macon, Georgia
- Nicknames: Macon Volunteers (special designation); Lightning Brigade (former)
- Motto: Send Me
- Colors: Infantry Blue
- Engagements: Indian Wars; American Civil War Confederate Service; World War I; Champagne-Marne; Aisne-Marne; St. Mihiel; Meuse-Argonne; Lorraine 1918; Champagne 1918; World War II; Normandy; Northern France; Rhineland; Ardennes-Alsace; Central Europe; Global War on Terrorism; Afghanistan; Operation Freedom's Sentinel; Iraq; Operation Spartan Shield; Operation Inherent Resolve
- Decorations: Presidential Unit Citation, Meritorious Unit Commendation, Belgian fourragère

Commanders
- Current commander: Colonel Nathan Stone

Insignia
- 48th IBCT distinctive unit insignia

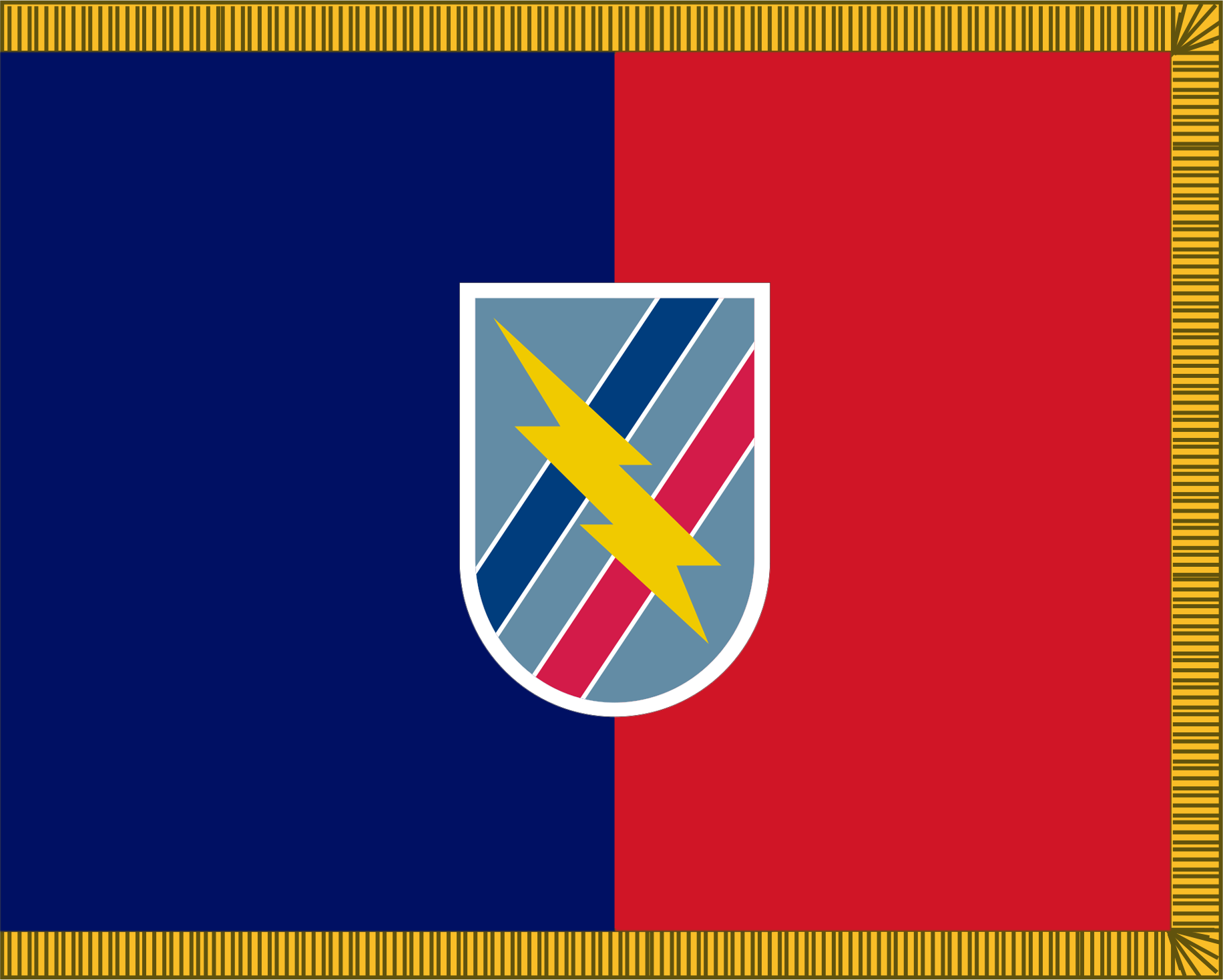
- 48th Infantry Brigade Flag

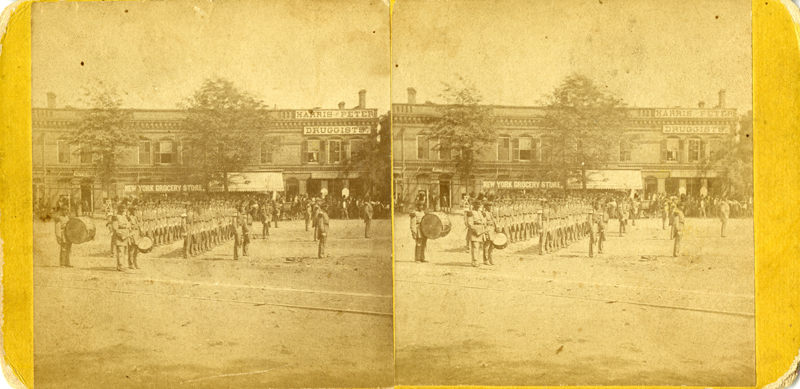
Stereographic image of the then Macon Volunteers on 2nd Street in front of Damour Block, circa 1880s.

The 48th Mobile Brigade Combat Team (48th MBCT) ("Macon Volunteers") is a modular infantry brigade of the Georgia Army National Guard. The lineage of the 48th Infantry Brigade can be traced back to 1825. It is one of few units in the United States military that also served as a unit of the Confederate States of America during the American Civil War. The 48th IBCT was a part of the U.S. Army's "Associated Units" program, aligned under the 3rd Infantry Division, a combined arms (armor and mechanized infantry) combat maneuver unit of the Regular Army, from 2016-2025.

== History ==
=== Background and organization ===
The 48th IBCT was originally organized on 23 April 1825, at Macon, Georgia, as the "Macon Volunteers, Georgia Volunteer Militia". It mustered into Federal service on 18 February 1836, at Picolata, Florida, as "Captain Seymor's Company, 1st Battalion Georgia Volunteers".

Georgia seceded from the United States in February 1861, and the unit was brought into Confederate service on 20 April 1861, reorganized and redesignated as Company D, 2nd Battalion, Georgia Infantry. It surrendered on 9 April 1865 at Appomattox, Virginia.

It was reorganized several times between the Civil War and World War II:

- 11 April 1872: reorganized as the Macon Volunteers
- 15 June 1874: reorganized and redesignated as Company B, 2nd Battalion
- 23 January 1891: reorganized and redesignated as Company B, 2nd Infantry Regiment
- 11 May 1898: mustered into Federal service at Griffin, Georgia, Company F, 1st Georgia Volunteer Infantry
- 18 November 1898: mustered out of federal service at Macon, Georgia, and resumed state status as Company B, 2nd Infantry Regiment
- 21 December 1899: redesignated as Georgia State Troopers
- 1 October 1905: redesignated as the Georgia National Guard
- August 1917: drafted into Federal service as Company B, 151st Machine Gun Battalion, an element of the 42nd Division.
- May 1919: demobilized at Camp Gordon, Georgia
- 29 November 1920: reorganized and federally recognized in the Georgia National Guard at Macon, Georgia, as Company H, 1st Infantry
- 8 March 1921 redesignated as Company B, 1st Infantry
- 1 July 1922 redesignated as Company B, 122nd Infantry Regiment
- 28 November 1922: reorganized and redesignated as Headquarters Company, 59th Infantry Brigade, an element of the 30th Division
- 16 September 1940: inducted into federal service at Macon, Georgia,
- 16 February 1942: redesignated as the 30th Cavalry Reconnaissance Troop while remaining assigned to the 30th Infantry Division
- 11 August 1943: redesignated as the 30th Reconnaissance Troop, Mechanized
- 17 November 1945: deactivated at Fort Jackson, South Carolina

From 1945 to 1973, the brigade underwent a series of further redesignations culminating in its current form, the 48th Infantry Brigade:

- 12 December 1946: reorganized and was federally recognized as Headquarters Company, 121st Infantry, an element of the 48th Infantry Division
- 1 November 1955: converted and redesignated as Headquarters and Headquarters Company, Combat Command B, 48th Armored Division
- 16 April 1963: reorganized and redesignated as Headquarters and Headquarters Company, 1st Brigade, 48th Armored Division
- 1 January 1968: converted and redesignated as Headquarters and Headquarters Company, 3d Brigade, 30th Infantry Division
- 1 December 1973: consolidated with the 182nd Military Police Company, then reorganized and redesignated as Headquarters and Headquarters Company, 48th Infantry Brigade

According to USArmypatches.com, the separate brigade insignia was worn from 16 April 1974 – 5 June 1999.

=== Operation Desert Storm ===
The unit was inducted into federal service on 30 November 1990 at Fort Stewart, GA. That year, more than 4,500 members of the unit were mobilized to participate in Operation Desert Storm. The unit completed training conducted at the Army's National Training Center in California, and was first and only National Guard combat brigade validated as combat-ready for the Gulf War. However, the brigade was criticized for being underprepared for war. The conflict ended before the 48th Infantry Brigade could be employed in the Persian Gulf and it subsequently demobilized on 10 April 1991 at Fort Stewart. The unit was awarded the Georgia Special Operations Ribbon by the State of Georgia for the mobilization. Mobilized soldiers were also awarded the Armed Forces Reserve Medal with "M" device, along with the National Defense Service Medal (NDSM) for the period 2 August 1990 and 30 November 1995.

In June 1999, the 48th Infantry Brigade (Enhanced) (Mechanized) became part of the newly re-flagged 24th Infantry Division. In 2006, the 24th Infantry Division was inactivated and the 48th Infantry Brigade Combat Team became part of the 35th Infantry Division, headquartered at Fort Leavenworth, KS.

=== Bosnia Deployment ===
Elements of the 48th Infantry Brigade deployed to Bosnia and Herzegovina for Stabilization Force (SFOR) Rotation 9 to provide support operations for Task Force Eagle (United States contingent to United Nations Operations in support of Dayton Peace Accord). The SFOR9 rotation was scheduled from April to October 2001. The Georgia units were mobilized under a Presidential Selective Reserve Call Up. While other National Guard units had participated in operations in Bosnia in the past, the 48th Infantry Brigade (Mechanized) was among the first National Guard combat units of this size and capability to take over such a large and significant portion of the mission.

=== Iraq Deployment ===
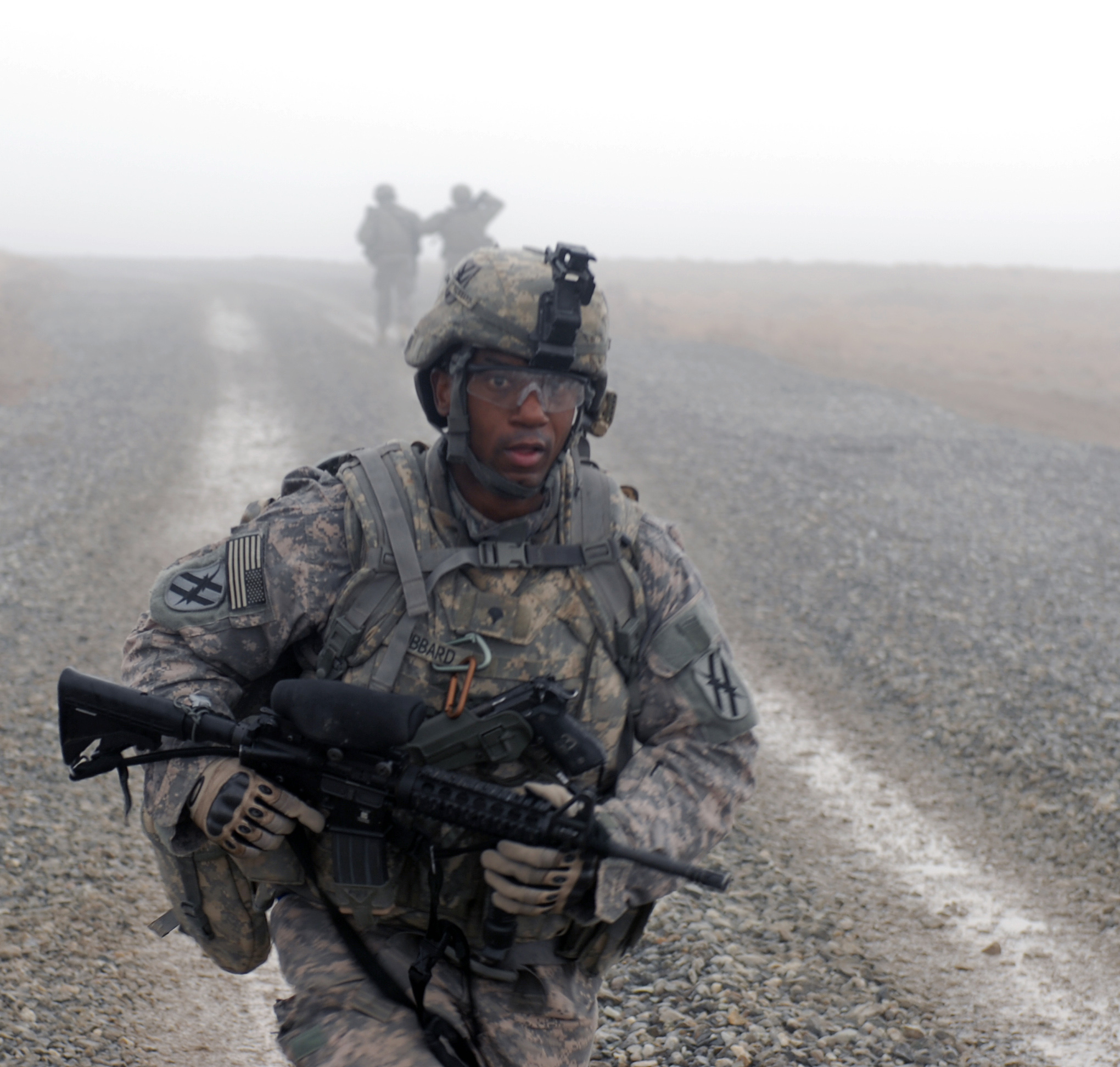
U.S. Army Spc. Darrell Hubbard, 1–121st Infantry, 48th Infantry Brigade Combat Team, Georgia Army National Guard, completes a nine-mile rucksack march around Gharib Ghar, a 7,000 ft. mountain near Kabul, Afghanistan, as part of the Non-commissioned officer of the Year competition. The competition was a rugged four-day test to identify the best of the 48th IBCT.

In October 2004, the 48th Infantry Brigade was notified that it would be mobilized into federal service in support of the global war on terrorism. Elements of the brigade began mobilizing in December 2004 at Fort Stewart, Georgia, with the remainder of the brigade entering federal service in early January 2005. The brigade completed five months of training, including a rotation at the National Training Center, Fort Irwin, California, and was validated as combat-ready.

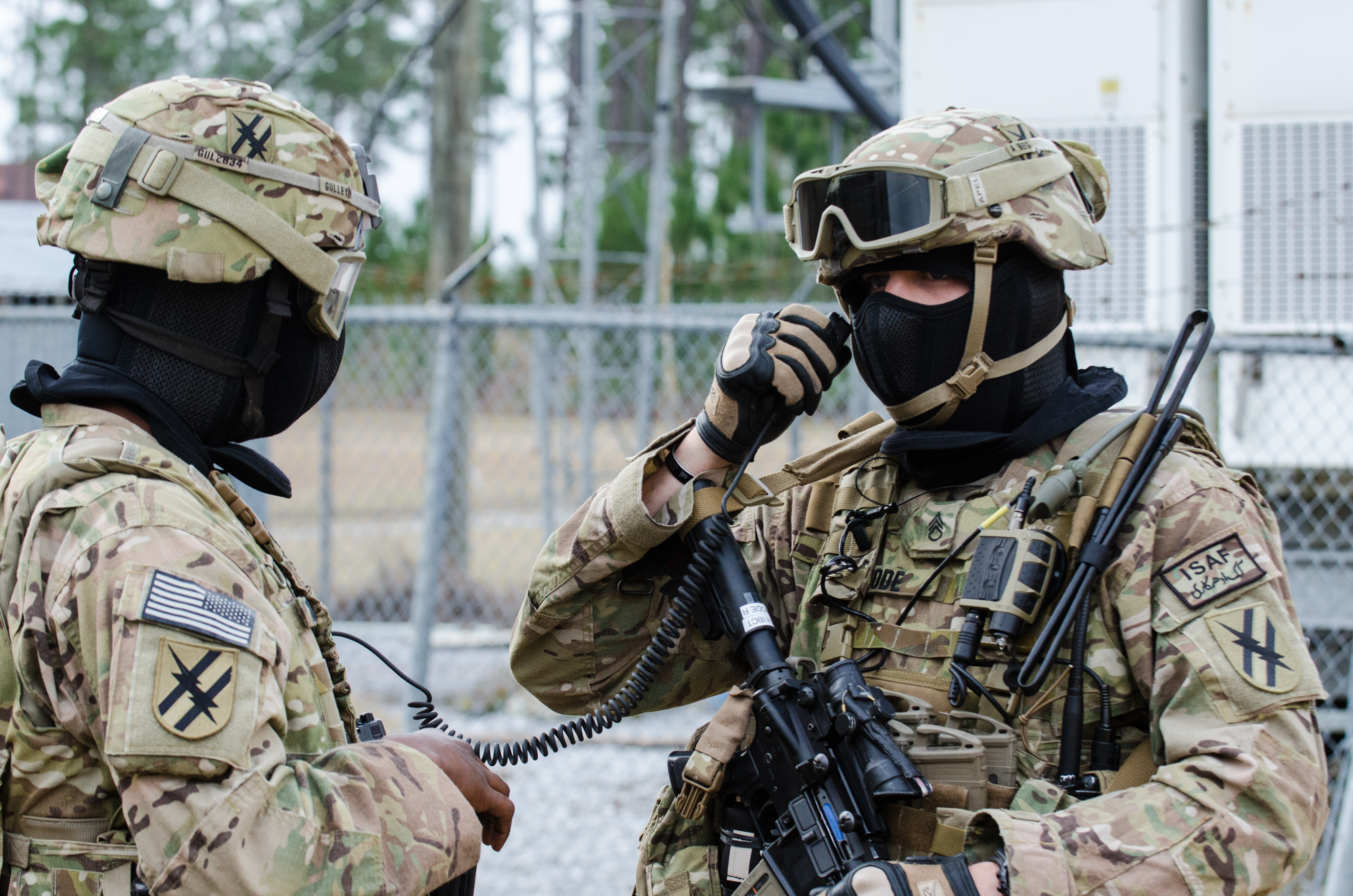

In May 2005, the unit began deploying to Iraq as part of Operation Iraqi Freedom III (the third major U.S. military rotation of forces into the area of operations), where it experienced some of the fiercest combat actions in the campaign. The brigade was assigned to Multi-National Division Baghdad (MND-B) under the control of the 3rd Infantry Division, and was responsible for a sector of southwest Baghdad nicknamed the Triangle of Death. It replaced the 2nd Brigade, 10th Mountain Division. The brigade was headquartered at Camp Stryker, part of the Victory Base Complex (VBC). Elements of the 48th Brigade occupied and maintained forward operating bases (FOBs) in Mahmudiyah, Latifiyah, and Yusifiyah. It established a joint United States / Iraqi Army permanent patrol base designated PB Lion's Den, located to the west of the Radwaniyah Palace Complex.

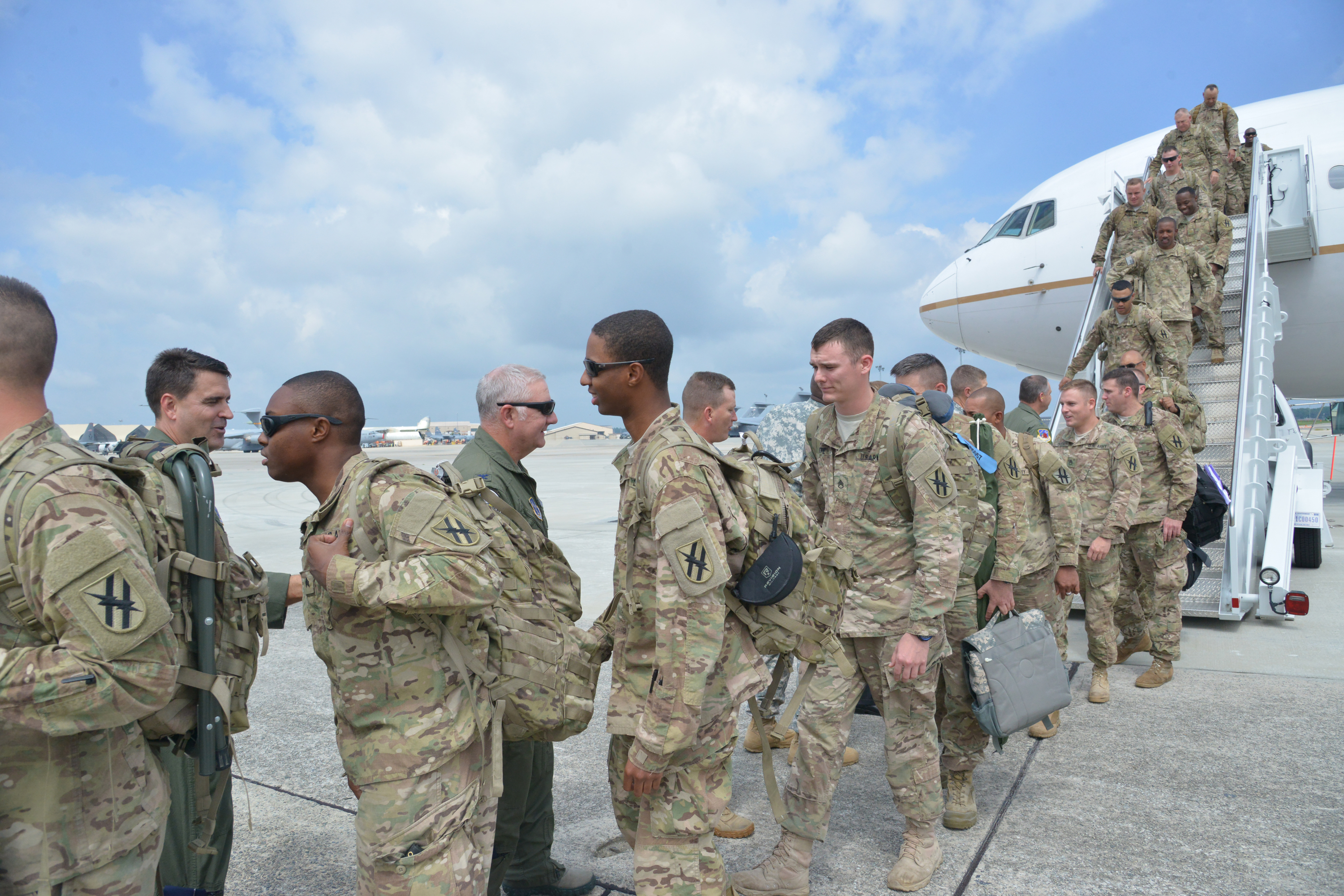
About 200 soldiers with the Army National Guard's 48th Brigade Infantry Combat Team were greeted by Team Robins members upon their return from Afghanistan 16 September 2014. The unit's arrival concludes a nine-month deployment in which soldiers provided base operations support, security, training and force protection. The 48th Brigade, commanded by Col. Randall Simmons and Command Sgt. Maj. Shawn Lewis, led some of the largest and most complex transfers of installations to date. (U.S. Air Force photo by Ray Crayton)

The 48th Brigade conducted a unique brigade-wide change of mission in October 2005, taking over the Iraq Theater of Operations (ITO) security mission from the 56th Brigade Combat Team. The 2nd Brigade, 101st Airborne Division replaced 48th Brigade units in Baghdad. The brigade's headquarters relocated to Camp Adder (also known as Ali Air Base or Tallil Air Base) in vicinity of Nasiriyah, Iraq, and the brigade had elements stationed as far south as Kuwait to as far north as Mosul, and as far west as the Syrian border.

On 20 April 2006, at Ft. Stewart, more than 4,000 members of the brigade began to return home after a year of combat operations in Iraq.

During this period, the 48th Infantry Brigade became the first unit in the Army to receive the new Army Combat Uniform in place of the older Battle Dress Uniform.

=== Afghanistan Deployments ===
In December 2007, the 48th Infantry Brigade Combat Team was alerted that it would be deployed to Afghanistan in the summer of 2009 in support of Operation Enduring Freedom (OEF). This rotation reflected the continued United States commitment to assisting in the security of Afghanistan and the development of the Afghan National Security Forces. The first elements of the 48th Brigade began training in January 2009 in preparation for a year-long deployment to Afghanistan.

In 2009, more than 3000 Guardsmen deployed from the 1st Battalion, 121st Infantry, headquartered in Winder, Georgia; 2nd Battalion, 121st Infantry, headquartered in Griffin, Georgia; 1st Battalion, 118th Field Artillery, headquartered in Savannah, Georgia; 1st Battalion, 108th Cavalry, headquartered in Calhoun, Georgia; 148th Brigade Special Troops Battalion, headquartered in Statesboro, GA; and the 48th Brigade Support Battalion, headquartered in Dublin, Georgia, to support Operation Enduring Freedom. The 48th IBCT returned home in March 2010 after being replaced by the 86th IBCT (MTN).

The 48th IBCT suffered eight casualties while deployed to Afghanistan:

- MAJ Kevin M. Jenrette (4 June 2009, 1–108th Cavalry)
- SFC John C. Beale (4 June 2009, 1–108th Cavalry)
- SGT Jeffrey W. Jordan (4 June 2009, 1–108th Cavalry)
- 1SG John D. Blair (20 June 2009, 1–121st Infantry)
- SGT Isaac Johnson, Jr. (6 July 2009, 1–108th Cavalry)
- SGT Brock Chavers (6 July 2009, 2–121st Infantry)
- SGT Raymundo P. Morales (21 July 2009, 1–108th Cavalry)
- SSG Alex French IV (30 September 2009, 1–121st Infantry)

=== 2024 Operation Spartan Shield & Inherent Resolve ===
The 48th IBCT deployed to the Central Command Area in support of Operation Spartan Shield & Inherent Resolve from March 2024 to November 2024 (with extensions as far as March 2025 due to rising tensions in the area). The unit was deployed under the name of Task Force Reaper, alongside the National Guard of other states like Kansas, California, Kentucky, and Mississippi. Soldiers served on rotation to areas including Kuwait, Syria, Iraq, Jordan, Saudi Arabia, Israel, and Egypt. The unit participated in the training missions of Eager Lion 24 in Jordan. In November 2024, the unit was awarded the Combat Infantryman and Combat Action Badges for combat actions, due to drone strikes while stationed at Al-Asad Airbase in Iraq and Mission Support Site Green Village and Rumalyn Landing Zone in Syria.

=== 3rd Infantry Division ===
In March 2016, the 48th Infantry Brigade was selected to participate in Associated Units pilot program. The program established a formal relationship between reserve and active duty components, allowing units to train and eventually deploy together. The 48th Brigade was paired with Task Force 1-28th Infantry Regiment, stationed at Fort Benning. The brigade was also associated with the active Army's 3rd Infantry Division at Fort Stewart. The soldiers of the 48th Brigade wear the 3rd Infantry Division patch but retain the 48th Brigade "Macon Volunteers" designation.

== Organization 2025 ==
- 48th Infantry Brigade Combat Team, in Macon
  - Headquarters and Headquarters Company, 48th Infantry Brigade Combat Team, in Macon
  - 1st Squadron, 108th Cavalry Regiment, in Calhoun
    - Headquarters and Headquarters Troop, 1st Squadron, 108th Cavalry Regiment, in Calhoun
    - Troop A, 1st Squadron, 108th Cavalry Regiment, in Cedartown
    - Troop B, 1st Squadron, 108th Cavalry Regiment, in Canton
    - Troop C (Dismounted), 1st Squadron, 108th Cavalry Regiment, in Dalton
  - 1st Battalion, 121st Infantry Regiment, in Winder
    - Headquarters and Headquarters Company, 1st Battalion, 121st Infantry Regiment, in Winder
    - Company A, 1st Battalion, 121st Infantry Regiment, in Lawrenceville
    - Company B, 1st Battalion, 121st Infantry Regiment, in Covington
    - Company C, 1st Battalion, 121st Infantry Regiment, in Gainesville
    - Company D (Weapons), 1st Battalion, 121st Infantry Regiment, in Milledgeville
  - 2nd Battalion, 121st Infantry Regiment, in Forsyth
    - Headquarters and Headquarters Company, 2nd Battalion, 121st Infantry Regiment, in Forsyth
    - Company A, 2nd Battalion, 121st Infantry Regiment, in Griffin
    - Company B, 2nd Battalion, 121st Infantry Regiment, in Newnan
    - Company C, 2nd Battalion, 121st Infantry Regiment, in Cordele
    - Company D (Weapons), 2nd Battalion, 121st Infantry Regiment, in Valdosta
  - 3rd Battalion, 121st Infantry Regiment, in Cumming
    - Headquarters and Headquarters Company, 3rd Battalion, 121st Infantry Regiment, in Cumming
    - Company A, 3rd Battalion, 121st Infantry Regiment, in Cumming
    - Company B, 3rd Battalion, 121st Infantry Regiment, in Atlanta
    - Company C, 3rd Battalion, 121st Infantry Regiment, in Atlanta
    - Company D (Weapons), 3rd Battalion, 121st Infantry Regiment, in Atlanta
  - 1st Battalion, 118th Field Artillery Regiment, in Savannah
    - Headquarters and Headquarters Battery, 1st Battalion, 118th Field Artillery Regiment, in Savannah
      - Detachment 1, Headquarters and Headquarters Battery, 1st Battalion, 118th Field Artillery Regiment, in Macon
      - Detachment 2, Headquarters and Headquarters Battery, 1st Battalion, 118th Field Artillery Regiment, in Winder
      - Detachment 3, Headquarters and Headquarters Battery, 1st Battalion, 118th Field Artillery Regiment, in Forsyth
      - Detachment 4, Headquarters and Headquarters Battery, 1st Battalion, 118th Field Artillery Regiment, in Cumming
      - Detachment 5, Headquarters and Headquarters Battery, 1st Battalion, 118th Field Artillery Regiment, in Calhoun
    - Battery A, 1st Battalion, 118th Field Artillery Regiment, in Springfield
    - Battery B, 1st Battalion, 118th Field Artillery Regiment, in Brunswick
    - Battery C, 1st Battalion, 118th Field Artillery Regiment, in Savannah
  - 177th Brigade Engineer Battalion, in Statesboro
    - Headquarters and Headquarters Company, 177th Brigade Engineer Battalion, in Statesboro
    - Company A (Combat Engineer), 177th Brigade Engineer Battalion, in Glennville
    - Company B (Combat Engineer), 177th Brigade Engineer Battalion, in Douglas
    - Company C (Signal), 177th Brigade Engineer Battalion, in Macon
    - Company D (Military Intelligence), 177th Brigade Engineer Battalion, at Fort Gillem
      - Detachment 1, Company D (Military Intelligence), 177th Brigade Engineer Battalion, at Hunter Army Airfield (RQ-28A UAV)
  - 148th Brigade Support Battalion, in Macon
    - Headquarters and Headquarters Company, 148th Brigade Support Battalion, in Macon
    - Company A (Distribution), 148th Brigade Support Battalion, in Dublin
    - Company B (Maintenance), 148th Brigade Support Battalion, in Jackson
    - Company C (Medical), 148th Brigade Support Battalion, in Macon
    - Company D (Forward Support), 148th Brigade Support Battalion, in Calhoun — attached to 1st Squadron, 108th Cavalry Regiment
    - Company E (Forward Support), 148th Brigade Support Battalion, in Metter — attached to 177th Brigade Engineer Battalion
    - Company F (Forward Support), 148th Brigade Support Battalion, in Savannah — attached to 1st Battalion, 118th Field Artillery Regiment
    - Company G (Forward Support), 148th Brigade Support Battalion, in Winder — attached to 1st Battalion, 121st Infantry Regiment
    - Company H (Forward Support), 148th Brigade Support Battalion, at Marine Corps Logistics Base Albany — attached to 2nd Battalion, 121st Infantry Regiment
    - Company I (Forward Support), 148th Brigade Support Battalion, in Cumming — attached to 3rd Battalion, 121st Infantry Regiment

== Pre-Modular organization ==
48th Infantry Brigade (Enhanced) (Mechanized)

- HHC
- 1st Battalion, 121st Infantry
- 2nd Battalion, 121st Infantry
- 1st Battalion, 108th Armor
- 1st Battalion, 118th Field Artillery (previously 1st Battalion, 230th Field Artillery)
- 148th Brigade Support Battalion
- 648th Engineer Battalion
- Troop E, 108th Cavalry
- 248th Military Intelligence Company
- Battery E, 179th Air Defense Artillery
