= Fakher Haider =

Iraqi freelance journalist and interpreter

- Born: 1967; Basra, Iraq
- Disappeared: September 19, 2005; Basra, Iraq
- Status: Found dead
- Died: September 20, 2005 (aged 37–38); Basra, Iraq
- Cause of death: Gunshot wound and beaten
- Body discovered: Basra, Iraq
- Occupations: Journalist, photographer and interpreter/handler
- Years active: 2 1/2 years
- Employer: The New York Times
- Known for: Handling foreign press during the Iraq War
- Spouse: Intisar Abbas Hamza
- Children: Three children

Fakher Haider (born 1967 – September 20, 2005), also known as the Navigator Haider, was an Iraqi freelance journalist and interpreter who was primarily a fixer for The New York Times. He was shot and beaten to death in Basra, Iraq, after unidentified men who were impersonating police officers kidnapped him from his apartment complex during the Iraq War.

== Personal ==
Fakher Haider was born in 1967 in Basra, Iraq. He was born a member of a large Shiite sect and eventually became a member of the Tamimi tribe. Fahker was known for his utter disdain for danger and his sarcastic humor. Fakher was married to Intisar Abbas Hamza and the two had three children together.

== Career ==
Before working for The New York Times, Haider had many other jobs. Haider was involved in the Shiite uprising against Saddam Hussein's government. He fought for the Shiite sect and also helped out the daughter of a Baathist official by making sure her brother had a proper burial. In doing so, the Baathist official granted Haider his life back and he was free from war. Haider then went to work at a fertilizer plant in Basar, Iraq. In March 2003, Haider had his first experience with journalism. During the war between Iraq and the United States, Haider noticed an American reporter struggling to communicate with Iraqi men. He stepped in and began to interpret for the woman; her name was Laurie Goering. Goering kick-started Haider's career in journalism and he then began to work for various media outlets all over the world. Haider did part-time work for Merbad TV, a local Basra television station, as well as for publications like The Guardian and National Geographic. For The Guardian, Haider published photographs in the publication as well as translated for their reporters. Rory Carrol was the Iraq correspondent for The Guardian during the time Haider was employed there. His main job though was working for The New York Times. He served as a Basra-based reporter and for the Times as well as an interpreter. Haider's inside knowledge of Basra greatly assisted him in working for the Times. A close colleague to Haider referred to him as the eyes and ears of places too dangerous to travel to. Haider worked for The New York Times for two and a half years before he was murdered.

== Death ==
Fakher Haider was killed in Basra, which is shown relative to the capital city Baghdad.

Haider had been in the line of death various times before his actual death because due to his danger-seeking, selfless personality. In A Drop of Blood, a short tributary video to Haider by a New York Times colleague, the tribute describes a situation where Haider stepped in between an American journalist and an Iraqi holding a rifle towards the American journalist. The narrator in the film describes Haider as one of the most selfless people he has ever met.

The last story Haider worked on was about Moqtada al-Sadr, an Iraqi Shia militia leader. On September 18, 2005, Haider was approached at his apartment complex in Basra, Iraq along with his wife and three young children, by men impersonating as police officers. They arrived at Haider's apartment complex in two cars and they all wore masks. The men ransacked Haider's apartment and were equipped with AK-47 assault rifles. The men told Haider's wife that they were only there to take Haider for a few hours to interrogate him and that they would return him in a few hours. Haider quickly jotted down the name and number of a female journalist colleague for his wife and told her to call her to contact the Basra governor's office. Haider was found dead on September 20, 2005, on the outskirts of Basra. He suffered from being beaten and from a gunshot wound to the head.

== Context ==
Handlers (media workers and journalists) are people who often work with foreign correspondents to assist them and provide them with insight information about where they are working. Handlers serve as translators and make information clearer to foreign correspondents. Often handlers are put in the line of danger because they assist foreign correspondents and typically side with the opposition. This, therefore, often causes tension among the handler and their homeland natives and leads them to face danger situations. The native people of the handler do not want their own native person exposing crucial information so they often stray to murdering innocent handlers.

== Impact ==
Various journalists alongside Haider were killed during the Iraq War. A total of 110 journalists were killed throughout the course of the Iraq War, which was initiated by the United States. Khalid Hasan was the second journalist who worked for The New York Times that was killed in Basra during the Iraq War. He was driving to work when he was shot and murdered without reason. An unnamed American freelance journalist also working in Basra was killed in August 2005, a month before Haider was brutally murdered. In July 2005, Stephen Vincent, an American freelance journalist, published an opinion editorial in The New York Times and was abducted and murdered a few days following the publish date. Baghdad was considered a death trap spot during the war. Countless journalists and media reporters risked and lost their lives to cover and relay information to people around the world. They were killed for doing their job and trying to keep the public informed.
