= 78th Aviation Troop Command =

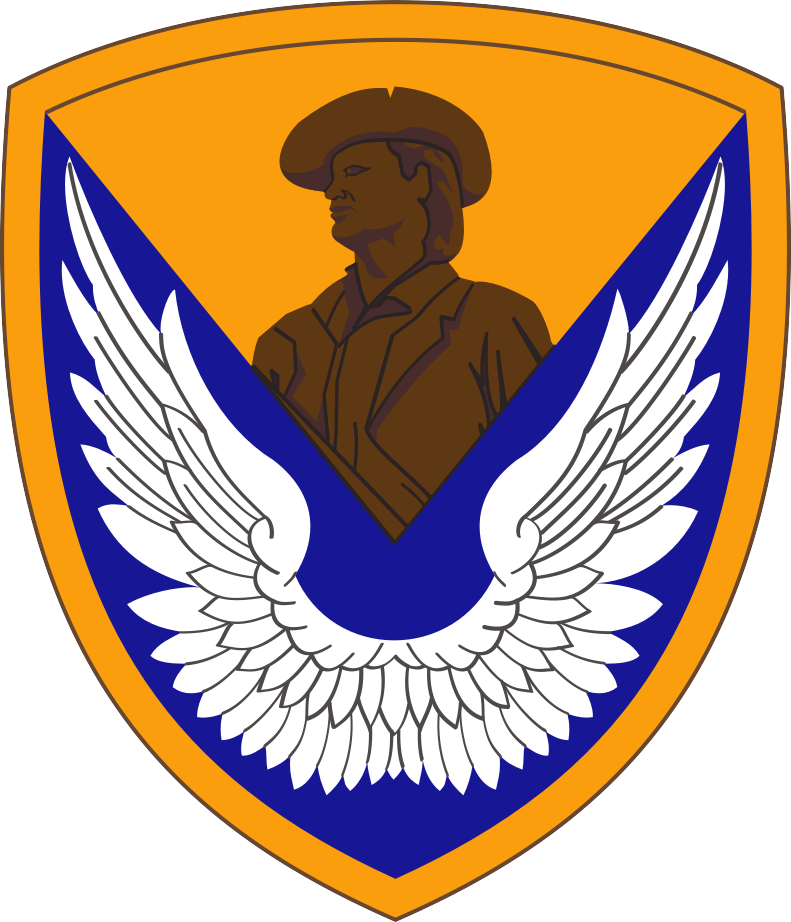
- 78th Aviation Troop Command SSI
- Active: October 1, 1978 - present
- Country: United States
- Branch: United States Army National Guard
- Type: Aviation
- Role: Troop Command
- Size: 500+
- Part of: Georgia Army National Guard
- Garrison/HQ: Marietta, Georgia

Commanders
- Current commander: COL Chris Buck
- Command Sergeant Major: CSM Clint Cowser

Aircraft flown
- Helicopter: UH-60 Blackhawk CH-47 Chinook UH-72 Lakota
- Transport: C-27J Spartan

The 78th Aviation Troop Command is the aviation arm of the Georgia Army National Guard; home-stationed at Clay National Guard Center in Marietta.

== Mission ==
The mission of the 78th's more than 574 pilots, aircrew, maintenance, and support personnel is to mobilize and deploy aviation forces for providing command and control, air movement, and air assault operations in support of combat operations worldwide, as well as to provide aviation support during state and national emergencies in response to homeland defense operations.

== Deployments ==
In December 2010, Company C, 1st Battalion, 185th Aviation Regiment teamed up with soldiers of the 1st Battalion (General Support), 171st Aviation Regiment to provide command, control and communication enhancement, as well as movement of cargo and troops in Iraq. They also deployed to provide aero-medical evacuation coverage to their assigned battle space as U.S. forces in Iraq were transitioning from Operation Iraqi Freedom to Operation New Dawn.

On February 3, 2011, Detachment 1, Company C, 1st Battalion, 111th Aviation Regiment deployed to Fort Hood before heading to Iraq, to begin its yearlong mission of providing MEDEVAC support as part of the Army's National Guard's Combat Aviation Brigade, 40th Infantry Division (CA ARNG), and the Combat Aviation Brigade, 29th Infantry Division (MD ARNG) to coalition forces involved in Operation New Dawn in Iraq.

== Organization ==
- 78th Aviation Troop Command, at Clay National Guard Center
  - Headquarters and Headquarters Company, 78th Aviation Troop Command, at Clay National Guard Center
  - Company C, 1st Battalion (Assault), 106th Aviation Regiment, at Barrow County Airport (UH-60M Black Hawk)
    - Detachment 1, Headquarters and Headquarters Company, 1st Battalion (Assault), 106th Aviation Regiment, at Barrow County Airport
    - Detachment 1, Company D (AVUM), 1st Battalion (Assault), 106th Aviation Regiment, at Barrow County Airport
    - Detachment 1, Company E (Forward Support), 1st Battalion (Assault), 106th Aviation Regiment, at Barrow County Airport
  - Detachment 1, Company B (Heavy Lift), 1st Battalion (General Support Aviation), 169th Aviation Regiment, at Hunter Army Airfield (CH-47F Chinook)
    - Detachment 2, Headquarters and Headquarters Company, 1st Battalion (General Support Aviation), 169th Aviation Regiment, at Hunter Army Airfield
    - Detachment 2, Company D (AVUM), 1st Battalion (General Support Aviation), 169th Aviation Regiment, at Hunter Army Airfield
    - Detachment 2, Company E (Forward Support), 1st Battalion (General Support Aviation), 169th Aviation Regiment, at Hunter Army Airfield
  - Company B, 2nd Battalion (Fixed Wing), 245th Aviation Regiment (Detachment 9, Operational Support Airlift Activity), at Dobbins Air Reserve Base (C-26E Metroliner)
  - Detachment 2, Company B (AVIM), 935th Aviation Support Battalion, at Hunter Army Airfield
  - 1st Battalion (General Support Aviation), 171st Aviation Regiment, at Clay National Guard Center
    - Headquarters and Headquarters Company, 1st Battalion (General Support Aviation), 171st Aviation Regiment, at Clay National Guard Center
      - Detachment 1, Headquarters and Headquarters Company, 1st Battalion (General Support Aviation), 171st Aviation Regiment, at Davenport Airport (IA) — (Iowa Army National Guard)
      - Detachment 2, Headquarters and Headquarters Company, 1st Battalion (General Support Aviation), 171st Aviation Regiment, at Greater Rochester Airport (NY) — (New York Army National Guard)
    - Company A (CAC), 1st Battalion (General Support Aviation), 171st Aviation Regiment, at Clay National Guard Center (UH-60L Black Hawk)
    - Company B (Heavy Lift), 1st Battalion (General Support Aviation), 171st Aviation Regiment, at Davenport Airport (IA) (CH-47F Chinook) — (Iowa Army National Guard)
      - Detachment 1, Company B (Heavy Lift), 1st Battalion (General Support Aviation), 171st Aviation Regiment, at St. Cloud Airport (MN) — (Minnesota Army National Guard)
    - Company C (MEDEVAC), 1st Battalion (General Support Aviation), 171st Aviation Regiment, at Greater Rochester Airport (NY) (HH-60L Black Hawk) — (New York Army National Guard)
      - Detachment 1, Company C (MEDEVAC), 1st Battalion (General Support Aviation), 171st Aviation Regiment, at Joint Base McGuire-Dix-Lakehurst (NJ) — (New Jersey Army National Guard)
    - Company D (AVUM), 1st Battalion (General Support Aviation), 171st Aviation Regiment, at Clay National Guard Center
      - Detachment 1, Company D (AVUM), 1st Battalion (General Support Aviation), 171st Aviation Regiment, at Davenport Airport (IA) — (Iowa Army National Guard)
      - Detachment 2, Company D (AVUM), 1st Battalion (General Support Aviation), 171st Aviation Regiment, at Greater Rochester Airport (NY) — (New York Army National Guard)
      - Detachment 3, Company D (AVUM), 1st Battalion (General Support Aviation), 171st Aviation Regiment, at Joint Base McGuire-Dix-Lakehurst (NJ) — (New Jersey Army National Guard)
      - Detachment 5, Company D (AVUM), 1st Battalion (General Support Aviation), 171st Aviation Regiment, at St. Cloud Airport (MN) — (Minnesota Army National Guard)
    - Company E (Forward Support), 1st Battalion (General Support Aviation), 171st Aviation Regiment, at Clay National Guard Center
      - Detachment 1, Company E (Forward Support), 1st Battalion (General Support Aviation), 171st Aviation Regiment, at Davenport Airport (IA) — (Iowa Army National Guard)
      - Detachment 2, Company E (Forward Support), 1st Battalion (General Support Aviation), 171st Aviation Regiment, at Greater Rochester Airport (NY) — (New York Army National Guard)
      - Detachment 3, Company E (Forward Support), 1st Battalion (General Support Aviation), 171st Aviation Regiment, at Joint Base McGuire-Dix-Lakehurst (NJ) — (New Jersey Army National Guard)
      - Detachment 5, Company E (Forward Support), 1st Battalion (General Support Aviation), 171st Aviation Regiment, at St. Cloud Airport (MN) — (Minnesota Army National Guard)
    - Company F (ATS), 1st Battalion (General Support Aviation), 171st Aviation Regiment, at Hammond Northshore Airport (LA) — (Louisiana Army National Guard)
    - Detachment 1, Company C (MEDEVAC), 1st Battalion (General Support Aviation), 111th Aviation Regiment, at Clay National Guard Center (HH-60L Black Hawk)
      - Detachment 3, Company D (AVUM), 1st Battalion (General Support Aviation), 111th Aviation Regiment, at Clay National Guard Center
      - Detachment 3, Company E (Forward Support), 1st Battalion (General Support Aviation), 111th Aviation Regiment, at Clay National Guard Center
    - Company C, 2nd Battalion (Security & Support), 151st Aviation Regiment, at Clay National Guard Center (UH-72A Lakota)

Aviation unit abbreviations: CAC — Command Aviation Company; MEDEVAC — Medical evacuation; AVUM — Aviation Unit Maintenance; AVIM — Aviation Intermediate Maintenance; ATS — Air Traffic Service

== Accomplishments ==
The 78th Aviation created the C-27J Spartan Joint Cargo Aircraft facility at Robins Air Force Base. Facility personnel successfully supported the first C-27J aircraft qualification courses taught there by New York-based L-3 Communications. Georgia Army National Guard Aviation has been, and remains, integral in the selection and fielding of the C-27J Spartan JCA. In 2010, Company H, 171st Aviation Regiment personnel successfully completed the multi-service operational test and evaluation of the aircraft, thereby completing transfer of the program, on time and budget, to the Georgia Air National Guard.
