= Georgia Army National Guard =

Component of the US Army and military of the state of Georgia

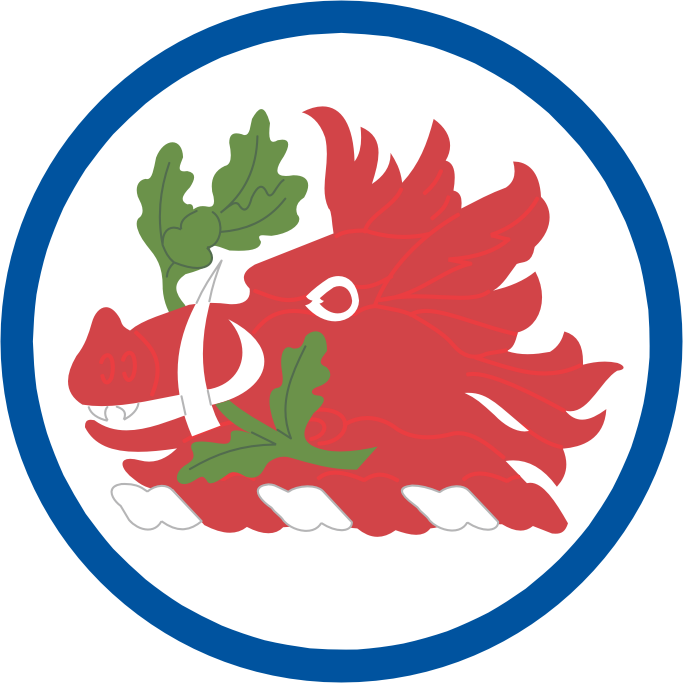
- Georgia National Guard Joint Force Headquarters–Army Element Shoulder Sleeve Insignia
- Active: 1751–present
- Countries: United States; Kingdom of Great Britain; Confederate States of America
- Allegiance: United States of America; Georgia
- Branch: United States Army National Guard
- Type: Army National Guard
- Role: ARNG Headquarters Command
- Size: 11,100+
- Part of: Georgia National Guard
- Garrison/HQ: General Lucius D. Clay National Guard Center
- Colors: Orange, metallic gold, sea foam
- Engagements: War on Terrorism

Commanders
- Current commander: BG Jason Fryman

Insignia
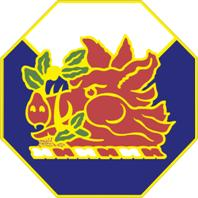
- Distinctive Unit Insignia

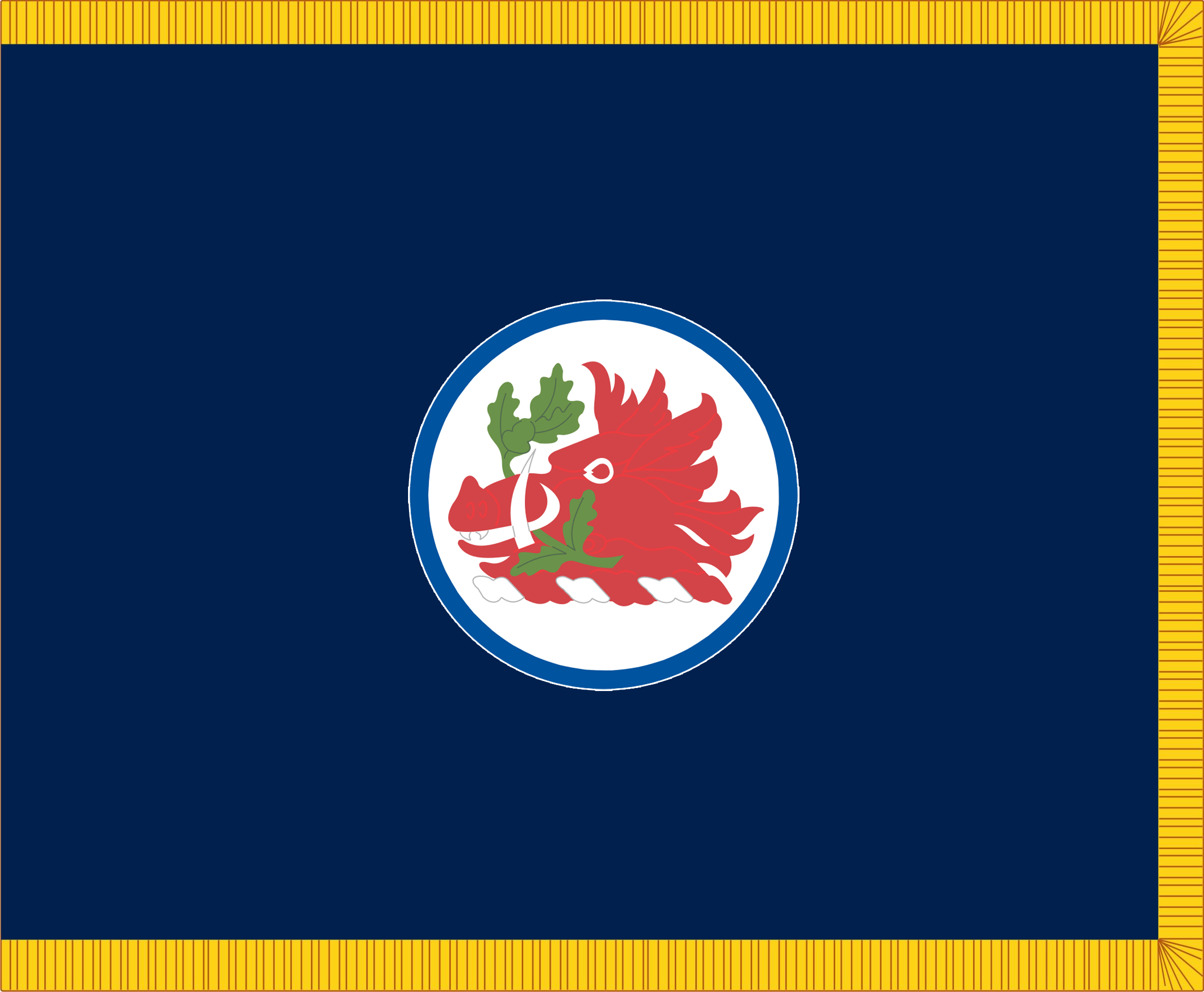
- Georgia ARNG Headquarters Flag

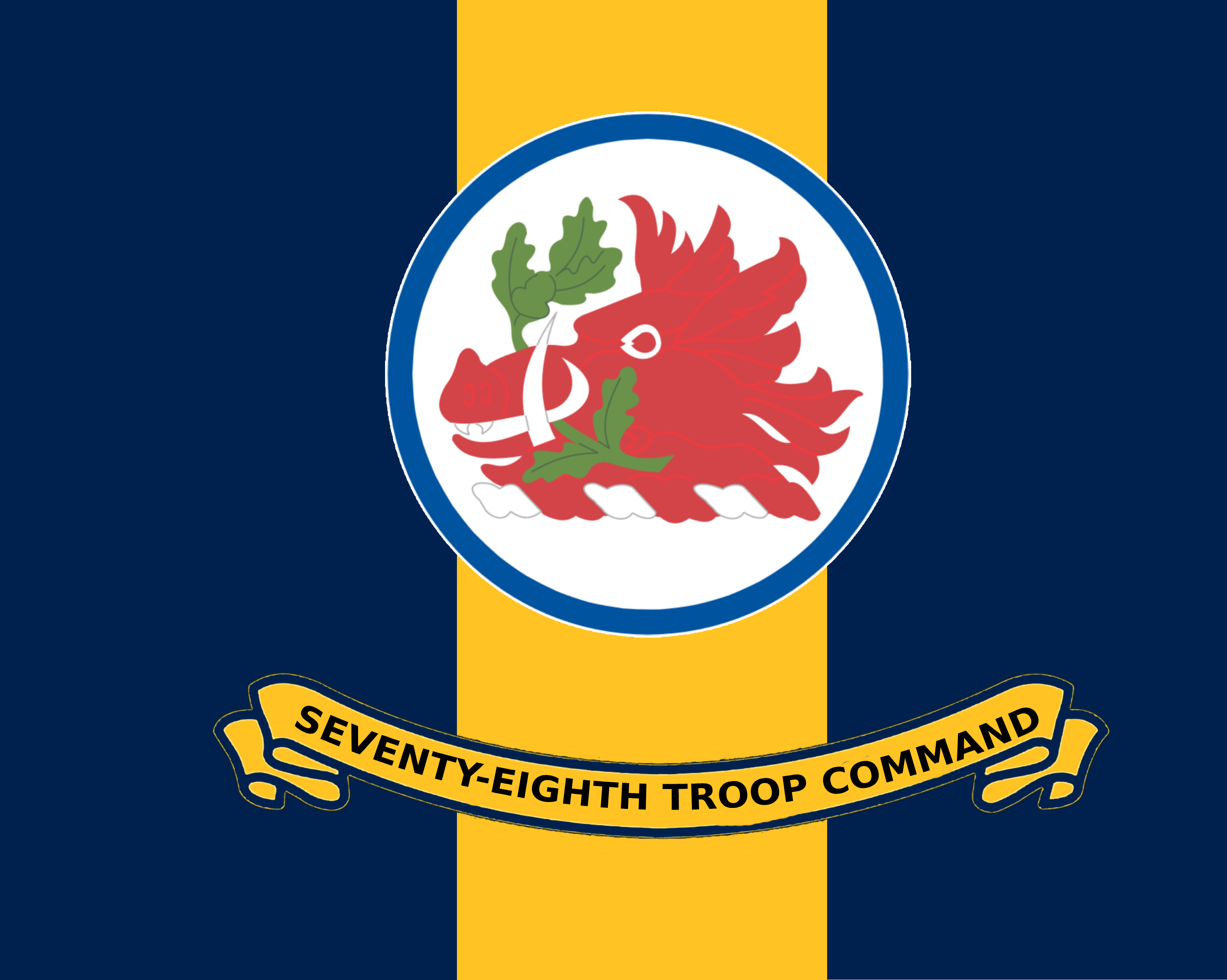
- Georgia ARNG 78th Troop Command Flag

- Georgia ARNG Crest

The Georgia Army National Guard is the Army National Guard component of the Georgia National Guard, administratively part of the Georgia Department of Defense. It consists of more than 11,100 citizen-soldiers training in more than 65 hometown armories and regional facilities across the state. Georgia’s Army Guard is the sixth largest in the nation and includes combat, combat support and combat service support units.

When activated under Title 10, the Georgia Army National Guard is a component of the United States Army and is absorbed into the National Guard of the United States. Nationwide, the Army National Guard has more than 430,000 members as of FY 2023. National coordination of various state National Guard units are maintained through the National Guard Bureau. When activated under Title 32, the Georgia Army National Guard remains under state command as it fulfills a federally assigned mission.

== Organization ==
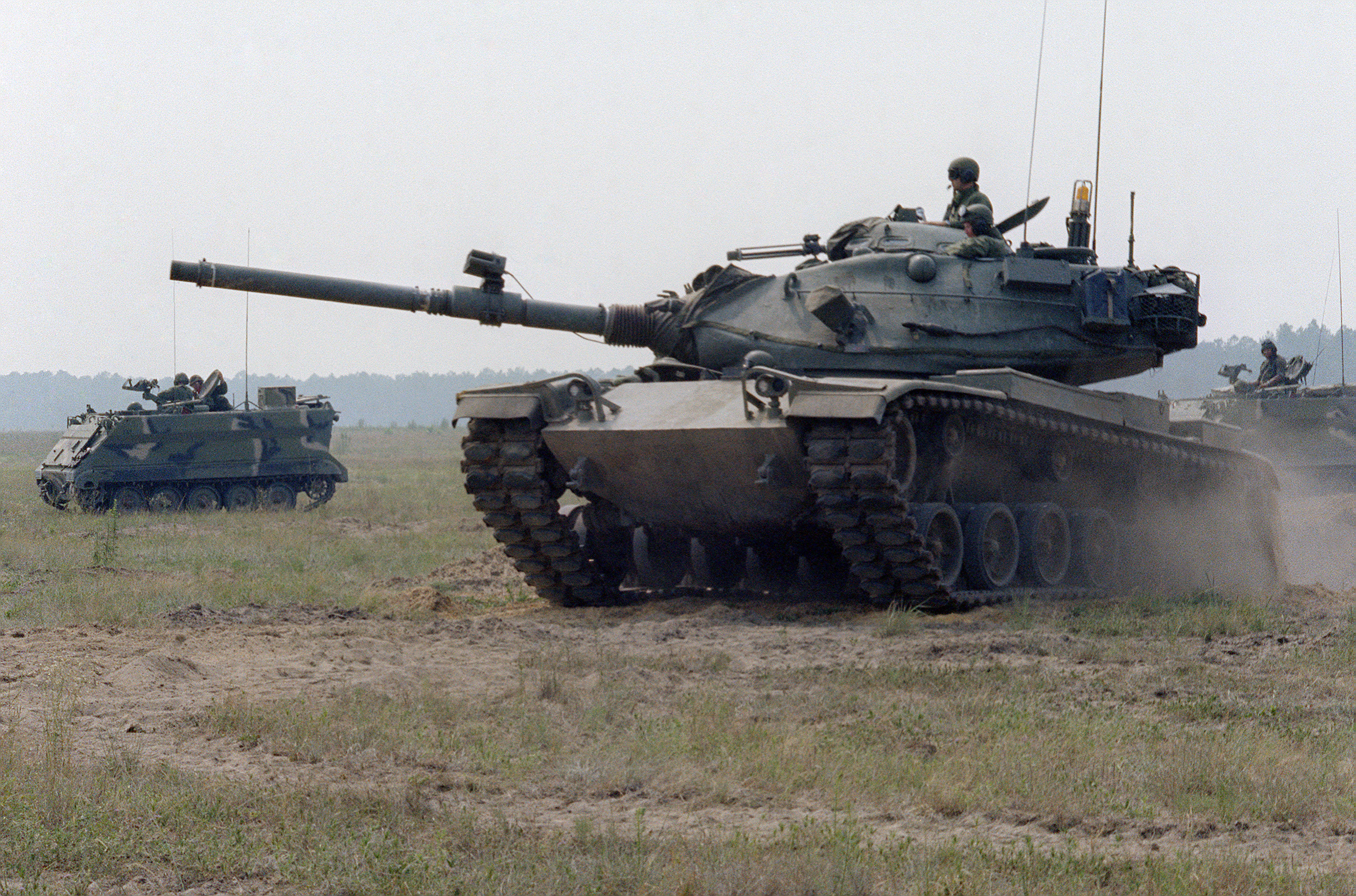
An M60A3 main battle tank (foreground) and an M113A1 armored personnel carrier (left background) from the 108th Armored Regiment, Georgia National Guard, move out to attack opposing forces. The training Exercise COMPANY TEAM DEFENSE 1983 is being conducted in preparation for annual training to be held at Fort Irwin, California.

- Joint Force Headquarters-Georgia, Army Element, at Clay National Guard Center
  - Headquarters and Headquarters Detachment, Joint Force Headquarters-Georgia, Army Element, at Clay National Guard Center
  - Combined Support Maintenance Shop — North, in Atlanta
  - Combined Support Maintenance Shop — South, at Fort Stewart
  - Georgia Maneuver Area Training Equipment Site (GA MATES), at Fort Stewart
  - Department of Logistics Maintenance, in Atlanta
  - Field Maintenance Shop Albany, at Marine Corps Logistics Base Albany
  - Field Maintenance Shop Atlanta, in Atlanta
  - Field Maintenance Shop Augusta, in Augusta
  - Field Maintenance Shop Benning, at Fort Benning
  - Field Maintenance Shop Calhoun, in Calhoun
  - Field Maintenance Shop Clay, at Clay National Guard Center
  - Field Maintenance Shop Dublin, in Dublin
  - Field Maintenance Shop Jackson, in Jackson
  - Field Maintenance Shop Kennesaw, in Kennesaw
  - Field Maintenance Shop Washington, in Washington
  - Field Maintenance Shop Winder, in Winder
  - Field Maintenance Shop Reset, at Fort Stewart
  - Field Maintenance Shop Fort Stewart, at Fort Stewart
  - Funeral Honors Team, in Ellenwood
  - Survivor Outreach, in Ellenwood
  - Georgia Recruiting & Retention Command, at Clay National Guard Center
    - Recruitment Sustainment Program Albany, at Marine Corps Logistics Base Albany
    - Recruitment Sustainment Program Atlanta, in Atlanta
    - Recruitment Sustainment Program Augusta, at Fort Gordon
    - Recruitment Sustainment Program Cumming, in Cumming
    - Recruitment Sustainment Program Ellenwood, in Ellenwood
    - Recruitment Sustainment Program Macon, in Macon
    - Recruitment Sustainment Program Objective Rally Point, in Cumming
    - Recruitment Sustainment Program Savannah, at Fort Stewart
    - Georgia Southern University (Recruiting & Retention), in Statesboro
    - University of North Georgia (Recruiting & Retention), in Dahlonega
    - Georgia Officer Training Site / Georgia Military College, in Milledgeville
    - Youth Challenge Academy, at Fort Stewart
    - Youth Challenge Academy, at Fort Gordon
  - 48th Infantry Brigade Combat Team, in Macon (part of 29th Infantry Division)
    - Headquarters and Headquarters Company, 48th Infantry Brigade Combat Team, in Macon
    - 1st Squadron, 108th Cavalry Regiment, in Calhoun
      - Headquarters and Headquarters Troop, 1st Squadron, 108th Cavalry Regiment, in Calhoun
      - Troop A, 1st Squadron, 108th Cavalry Regiment, in Cedartown
      - Troop B, 1st Squadron, 108th Cavalry Regiment, in Canton
      - Troop C (Dismounted), 1st Squadron, 108th Cavalry Regiment, in Dalton
    - 1st Battalion, 121st Infantry Regiment, in Winder
      - Headquarters and Headquarters Company, 1st Battalion, 121st Infantry Regiment, in Winder
      - Company A, 1st Battalion, 121st Infantry Regiment, in Lawrenceville
      - Company B, 1st Battalion, 121st Infantry Regiment, in Covington
      - Company C, 1st Battalion, 121st Infantry Regiment, in Gainesville
      - Company D (Weapons), 1st Battalion, 121st Infantry Regiment, in Milledgeville
    - 2nd Battalion, 121st Infantry Regiment, in Forsyth
      - Headquarters and Headquarters Company, 2nd Battalion, 121st Infantry Regiment, in Forsyth
      - Company A, 2nd Battalion, 121st Infantry Regiment, in Griffin
      - Company B, 2nd Battalion, 121st Infantry Regiment, in Newnan
      - Company C, 2nd Battalion, 121st Infantry Regiment, in Cordele
      - Company D (Weapons), 2nd Battalion, 121st Infantry Regiment, in Valdosta
    - 3rd Battalion, 121st Infantry Regiment, in Cumming
      - Headquarters and Headquarters Company, 3rd Battalion, 121st Infantry Regiment, in Cumming
      - Company A, 3rd Battalion, 121st Infantry Regiment, in Cumming
      - Company B, 3rd Battalion, 121st Infantry Regiment, in Atlanta
      - Company C, 3rd Battalion, 121st Infantry Regiment, in Atlanta
      - Company D (Weapons), 3rd Battalion, 121st Infantry Regiment, in Atlanta
    - 1st Battalion, 118th Field Artillery Regiment, in Savannah
      - Headquarters and Headquarters Battery, 1st Battalion, 118th Field Artillery Regiment, in Savannah
        - Detachment 1, Headquarters and Headquarters Battery, 1st Battalion, 118th Field Artillery Regiment, in Macon
        - Detachment 2, Headquarters and Headquarters Battery, 1st Battalion, 118th Field Artillery Regiment, in Winder
        - Detachment 3, Headquarters and Headquarters Battery, 1st Battalion, 118th Field Artillery Regiment, in Forsyth
        - Detachment 4, Headquarters and Headquarters Battery, 1st Battalion, 118th Field Artillery Regiment, in Cumming
        - Detachment 5, Headquarters and Headquarters Battery, 1st Battalion, 118th Field Artillery Regiment, in Calhoun
      - Battery A, 1st Battalion, 118th Field Artillery Regiment, in Springfield
      - Battery B, 1st Battalion, 118th Field Artillery Regiment, in Brunswick
      - Battery C, 1st Battalion, 118th Field Artillery Regiment, in Savannah
    - 177th Brigade Engineer Battalion, in Statesboro
      - Headquarters and Headquarters Company, 177th Brigade Engineer Battalion, in Statesboro
      - Company A (Combat Engineer), 177th Brigade Engineer Battalion, in Glennville
      - Company B (Combat Engineer), 177th Brigade Engineer Battalion, in Douglas
      - Company C (Signal), 177th Brigade Engineer Battalion, in Macon
      - Company D (Military Intelligence), 177th Brigade Engineer Battalion, at Fort Gillem
        - Detachment 1, Company D (Military Intelligence), 177th Brigade Engineer Battalion, at Hunter Army Airfield (RQ-28A UAV)
    - 148th Brigade Support Battalion, in Macon
      - Headquarters and Headquarters Company, 148th Brigade Support Battalion, in Macon
      - Company A (Distribution), 148th Brigade Support Battalion, in Dublin
      - Company B (Maintenance), 148th Brigade Support Battalion, in Jackson
      - Company C (Medical), 148th Brigade Support Battalion, in Macon
      - Company D (Forward Support), 148th Brigade Support Battalion, in Calhoun — attached to 1st Squadron, 108th Cavalry Regiment
      - Company E (Forward Support), 148th Brigade Support Battalion, in Metter — attached to 177th Brigade Engineer Battalion
      - Company F (Forward Support), 148th Brigade Support Battalion, in Savannah — attached to 1st Battalion, 118th Field Artillery Regiment
      - Company G (Forward Support), 148th Brigade Support Battalion, in Winder — attached to 1st Battalion, 121st Infantry Regiment
      - Company H (Forward Support), 148th Brigade Support Battalion, at Marine Corps Logistics Base Albany — attached to 2nd Battalion, 121st Infantry Regiment
      - Company I (Forward Support), 148th Brigade Support Battalion, in Cumming — attached to 3rd Battalion, 121st Infantry Regiment
  - 78th Aviation Troop Command, at Clay National Guard Center
    - Headquarters and Headquarters Company, 78th Aviation Troop Command, at Clay National Guard Center
    - Army Aviation Support Facility #1, at Barrow County Airport
    - Army Aviation Support Facility #2, at Clay National Guard Center
    - Army Aviation Support Facility #3, at Hunter Army Airfield
    - Company C, 1st Battalion (Assault), 106th Aviation Regiment, at Clay National Guard Center (UH-60M Black Hawk)
      - Detachment 1, Headquarters and Headquarters Company, 1st Battalion (Assault), 106th Aviation Regiment, at Clay National Guard Center
      - Detachment 1, Company D (AVUM), 1st Battalion (Assault), 106th Aviation Regiment, at Clay National Guard Center
      - Detachment 1, Company E (Forward Support), 1st Battalion (Assault), 106th Aviation Regiment, at Clay National Guard Center
    - Detachment 1, Company B (Heavy Lift), 1st Battalion (General Support Aviation), 169th Aviation Regiment, at Hunter Army Airfield (CH-47F Chinook)
      - Detachment 2, Headquarters and Headquarters Company, 1st Battalion (General Support Aviation), 169th Aviation Regiment, at Hunter Army Airfield
      - Detachment 2, Company D (AVUM), 1st Battalion (General Support Aviation), 169th Aviation Regiment, at Hunter Army Airfield
      - Detachment 2, Company E (Forward Support), 1st Battalion (General Support Aviation), 169th Aviation Regiment, at Hunter Army Airfield
    - Company B, 2nd Battalion (Fixed Wing), 245th Aviation Regiment (Detachment 9, Operational Support Airlift Activity), at Clay National Guard Center (C-26E Metroliner)
    - Detachment 2, Company B (AVIM), 935th Aviation Support Battalion, at Hunter Army Airfield
    - 1st Battalion (General Support Aviation), 171st Aviation Regiment, at Clay National Guard Center
      - Headquarters and Headquarters Company, 1st Battalion (General Support Aviation), 171st Aviation Regiment, at Clay National Guard Center
        - Detachment 1, Headquarters and Headquarters Company, 1st Battalion (General Support Aviation), 171st Aviation Regiment, at Davenport Airport (IA) — (Iowa Army National Guard)
        - Detachment 2, Headquarters and Headquarters Company, 1st Battalion (General Support Aviation), 171st Aviation Regiment, at Greater Rochester Airport (NY) — (New York Army National Guard)
      - Company A (CAC), 1st Battalion (General Support Aviation), 171st Aviation Regiment, at Clay National Guard Center (UH-60L Black Hawk)
      - Company B (Heavy Lift), 1st Battalion (General Support Aviation), 171st Aviation Regiment, at Davenport Airport (IA) (CH-47F Chinook) — (Iowa Army National Guard)
        - Detachment 1, Company B (Heavy Lift), 1st Battalion (General Support Aviation), 171st Aviation Regiment, at St. Cloud Airport (MN) — (Minnesota Army National Guard)
      - Company C (MEDEVAC), 1st Battalion (General Support Aviation), 171st Aviation Regiment, at Greater Rochester Airport (NY) (HH-60L Black Hawk) — (New York Army National Guard)
        - Detachment 1, Company C (MEDEVAC), 1st Battalion (General Support Aviation), 171st Aviation Regiment, at Joint Base McGuire-Dix-Lakehurst (NJ) — (New Jersey Army National Guard)
      - Company D (AVUM), 1st Battalion (General Support Aviation), 171st Aviation Regiment, at Clay National Guard Center
        - Detachment 1, Company D (AVUM), 1st Battalion (General Support Aviation), 171st Aviation Regiment, at Davenport Airport (IA) — (Iowa Army National Guard)
        - Detachment 2, Company D (AVUM), 1st Battalion (General Support Aviation), 171st Aviation Regiment, at Greater Rochester Airport (NY) — (New York Army National Guard)
        - Detachment 3, Company D (AVUM), 1st Battalion (General Support Aviation), 171st Aviation Regiment, at Joint Base McGuire-Dix-Lakehurst (NJ) — (New Jersey Army National Guard)
        - Detachment 5, Company D (AVUM), 1st Battalion (General Support Aviation), 171st Aviation Regiment, at St. Cloud Airport (MN) — (Minnesota Army National Guard)
      - Company E (Forward Support), 1st Battalion (General Support Aviation), 171st Aviation Regiment, at Clay National Guard Center
        - Detachment 1, Company E (Forward Support), 1st Battalion (General Support Aviation), 171st Aviation Regiment, at Davenport Airport (IA) — (Iowa Army National Guard)
        - Detachment 2, Company E (Forward Support), 1st Battalion (General Support Aviation), 171st Aviation Regiment, at Greater Rochester Airport (NY) — (New York Army National Guard)
        - Detachment 3, Company E (Forward Support), 1st Battalion (General Support Aviation), 171st Aviation Regiment, at Joint Base McGuire-Dix-Lakehurst (NJ) — (New Jersey Army National Guard)
        - Detachment 5, Company E (Forward Support), 1st Battalion (General Support Aviation), 171st Aviation Regiment, at St. Cloud Airport (MN) — (Minnesota Army National Guard)
      - Company F (ATS), 1st Battalion (General Support Aviation), 171st Aviation Regiment, at Hammond Northshore Airport (LA) — (Louisiana Army National Guard)
      - Detachment 1, Company C (MEDEVAC), 1st Battalion (General Support Aviation), 111th Aviation Regiment, at Barrow County Airport (HH-60L Black Hawk)
        - Detachment 3, Company D (AVUM), 1st Battalion (General Support Aviation), 111th Aviation Regiment, at Barrow County Airport
        - Detachment 3, Company E (Forward Support), 1st Battalion (General Support Aviation), 111th Aviation Regiment, at Barrow County Airport
      - Company C, 2nd Battalion (Security & Support), 151st Aviation Regiment, at Clay National Guard Center (UH-72A Lakota)
  - 78th Troop Command, in Marietta
    - Headquarters and Headquarters Detachment, 78th Troop Command, in Marietta
    - Georgia Army National Guard Land Dominance Center, at Fort Stewart
    - Georgia Medical Detachment, at Clay National Guard Center
      - Detachment 1, Georgia Medical Detachment, at Fort Stewart
    - 781st Troop Command, at Clay National Guard Center
      - Headquarters and Headquarters Company, 781st Troop Command, at Clay National Guard Center
      - Detachment 1, Headquarters and Headquarters Company, 116th Military Intelligence Brigade, at Fort Gordon
      - 93rd Finance Battalion, at Clay National Guard Center
      - 116th Army Band, at Clay National Guard Center
      - 122nd Tactical Support Detachment, in Douglasville and at Clay National Guard Center
      - 124th Mobile Public Affairs Detachment, at Clay National Guard Center
      - 139th Chaplain Detachment, at Clay National Guard Center
      - 161st Military History Detachment, at Clay National Guard Center
      - 165th Quartermaster Company (Theater Aerial Delivery) (Airborne), at Dobbins Air Reserve Base
      - Georgia Cyber Protection Team 170, at Clay National Guard Center
      - 224th Ground Liaison Detachment, in Ellenwood
      - 278th Ground Liaison Detachment, in Ellenwood
      - 560th Battlefield Coordination Detachment, in Douglasville
      - 473rd Theater Public Affairs Support Element, at Clay National Guard Center
      - 1078th Judge Advocate General Trial Defense Team, at Clay National Guard Center
      - 1732nd Judge Advocate General Forward Trial Defense Team, at Clay National Guard Center
    - 110th Combat Sustainment Support Battalion, in Tifton
      - Headquarters and Headquarters Company, 110th Combat Sustainment Support Battalion, in Tifton
      - 166th Quartermaster Platoon (Field Feeding), in Kennesaw
      - 175th Quartermaster Detachment (Equipment Support), at Clay National Guard Center
      - 230th Quartermaster Platoon (Field Feeding), at Fort Stewart
      - 277th Ordnance Company (Support Maintenance), in Kennesaw
      - 1148th Transportation Company (Medium Truck) (Cargo), at Fort Gordon
      - 1230th Transportation Company (Medium Truck) (Cargo), in Thomasville
      - 1788th Quartermaster Company (Classification and Inspection Company), in Hinesville
    - 221st Intelligence and Electronic Warfare Battalion, at Fort Gillem
      - Headquarters and Headquarters Company, 221st Military Intelligence Battalion, at Fort Gillem
      - Company A, 221st Military Intelligence Battalion, at Fort Gillem
      - Company B, 221st Military Intelligence Battalion, at Fort Gillem
      - 111th Electromagnetic Warfare Company, at Fort Gillem
    - 122nd Regiment, Regional Training Institute, at Clay National Guard Center
      - 1st Battalion (Military Intelligence), at Clay National Guard Center
      - 2nd Battalion (Signal), at Clay National Guard Center
      - Regional Training Site-Maintenance, at Fort Stewart
  - 201st Regional Support Group, at Dobbins Air Reserve Base
    - Headquarters and Headquarters Detachment, 201st Regional Support Group, at Dobbins Air Reserve Base
    - 170th Military Police Battalion, in Decatur
      - Headquarters and Headquarters Detachment, 170th Military Police Battalion, in Decatur
      - 178th Military Police Company, in Monroe
      - 179th Military Police Company, at Fort Stewart
    - 265th Chemical Battalion, at Dobbins Air Reserve Base
      - Headquarters and Headquarters Company, at Dobbins Air Reserve Base
      - 4th Civil Support Team (WMD), at Dobbins Air Reserve Base
      - 138th Chemical Company, at Dobbins Air Reserve Base
      - 202nd Ordnance Detachment (EOD), in Waynesboro
      - 248th Medical Company (Area Support), in Marietta
      - 810th Engineer Company (Combat Engineer Company — Infantry), in Swainsboro
      - 870th Engineer Detachment (Explosive Hazards Coordination Cell), at Dobbins Air Reserve Base
      - 1160th Transportation Company (Medium Truck) (PLS), in Rome
      - 1177th Transportation Company (Medium Truck) (Cargo), in LaGrange
  - 648th Maneuver Enhancement Brigade, at Fort Benning
    - Headquarters Support Company, at Fort Benning
    - 420th Signal Company, in Cumming
    - 3rd Infantry Division Main Command Post-Operational Detachment, at Fort Stewart
    - 1st Battalion (Infantry), 54th Security Force Assistance Brigade, at Fort Benning
      - Headquarters Support Company, 1st Battalion (Infantry), 54th Security Force Assistance Brigade, at Fort Benning
      - Company A, 1st Battalion (Infantry), 54th Security Force Assistance Brigade, at Fort Benning
      - Company B, 1st Battalion (Infantry), 54th Security Force Assistance Brigade, at Fort Benning
      - Company C, 1st Battalion (Infantry), 54th Security Force Assistance Brigade, at Fort Benning
    - 1st Battalion, 214th Field Artillery Regiment, in Elberton (M109A6 Paladin) (part of 130th Field Artillery Brigade)
      - Headquarters and Headquarters Battery, 1st Battalion, 214th Field Artillery Regiment, in Elberton
      - Battery A, 1st Battalion, 214th Field Artillery Regiment, in Hartwell
      - Battery B, 1st Battalion, 214th Field Artillery Regiment, in Thomson
      - Battery C, 1st Battalion, 214th Field Artillery Regiment, in Ellenwood
      - 1214th Forward Support Company, in Washington
    - 878th Engineer Battalion, in Augusta
      - Headquarters and Headquarters Company, 878th Engineer Battalion, in Augusta
      - Company A (Forward Support), 878th Engineer Battalion, in Augusta
      - 177th Engineer Company (Topographic), at Fulton County Airport
      - 848th Engineer Company (Sapper), in Ellenwood
      - 863rd Engineer Detachment (Utilities ), in Toccoa
      - 874th Engineer Detachment (Utilities ), in Toccoa
      - 876th Engineer Company (Engineer Support Company), in Columbus
      - 877th Engineer Company (Engineer Construction Company), in Augusta

Aviation unit abbreviations: CAC — Command Aviation Company; MEDEVAC — Medical evacuation; AVUM — Aviation Unit Maintenance; AVIM — Aviation Intermediate Maintenance; ATS — Air Traffic Service

== Duties ==
National Guard units can be federalized by presidential order to supplement regular armed forces, and upon declaration of a state of emergency by the governor of the state in which they serve. Unlike Army Reserve members, National Guard members cannot be mobilized individually (except through voluntary transfers and Temporary Duty Assignments TDY), but only as part of their respective units.

=== Active duty call-ups ===
For much of the final decades of the twentieth century, National Guard personnel typically served "one weekend a month, two weeks a year", with a portion working for the Guard in a full-time capacity. The current forces formation plans of the US Army call for the typical National Guard unit (or national guardsman) to serve one year of active duty for every three years of service. More specifically, current Department of Defense policy is that no guardsman will be involuntarily activated for a total of more than 24 months (cumulative) in one six-year enlistment period (this policy is due to change 1 August 2007, the new policy states that soldiers will be given 24 months between deployments of no more than 24 months, individual states have differing policies).

== History ==
The Georgia Army National Guard was originally formed in 1751 to serve as colonial militia during the French and Indian War. The 118th Field Artillery (GA ARNG), which traces its lineage to militia units from Savannah and surrounding Chatham County that served in the War of 1812, is one of only nineteen Army National Guard units with campaign credit for the War of 1812.

The Militia Act of 1903 organized the various U.S. state militias into the present National Guard system. The 121st and 122nd Infantry Regiments, formed from existing Georgia state regiments, formed the 61st Infantry Brigade of the 31st Dixie Division mobilized for World War I. The two regiments served with that brigade from August 1917 to November 1918.

After World War II, the 48th Infantry Division was organized in the state, but on 1 November 1955, was reorganized as the 48th Armored Division. The division was commanded before and immediately after its change of name by Maj. Gen. Joseph B. Fraser of Hinesville. The new armored division’s authorized strength was 7,727, a drop of more than 2,000 from the Infantry Division; however a non-divisional group of more than 2,000 was also formed during the 1955 reorganization and re-designation of Georgia’s Army Guard units. The 48th Armored Division was disbanded on 1 January 1968.

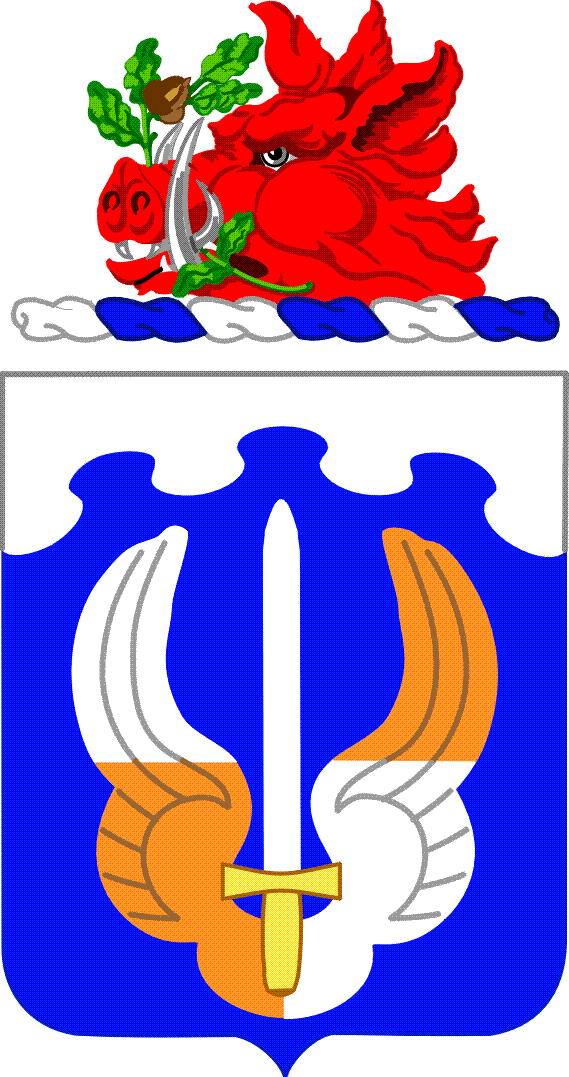
Insignia of the 171st Aviation Regiment

The 118th Field Artillery was broken up on 1 January 1968 and its elements reorganized and were redesignated, with Headquarters, Headquarters and Service Battery, 1st Battalion, consolidated with Headquarters and Headquarters Battery, 48th Armored Division Artillery, and the consolidated unit reorganized and was redesignated as Headquarters and Headquarters Battery, 118th Artillery Group. It was redesignated on 9 May 1978 as Headquarters and Headquarters Battery, 118th Field Artillery Brigade.

In 1984-85, the 118th Field Artillery Brigade was headquartered at Savannah and comprised the 1st and 2nd Battalions of the 214th Field Artillery, both using 155-mm towed artillery pieces. In the late 1980s the 171st Aviation Regiment was formed in the state.
