= 214th Field Artillery Regiment =

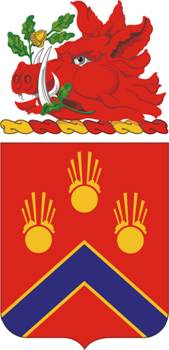
- Coat of arms
- Active: 1939
- Country: United States
- Allegiance: Georgia (U.S. state)
- Branch: United States Army
- Size: Regiment
- Part of: Georgia Army National Guard; 648th Maneuver Enhancement Brigade
- Mottos: "We Hear and Strike"

Insignia
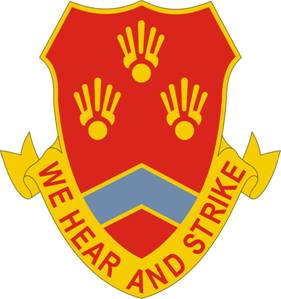
- Distinctive unit insignia

The 214th Field Artillery Regiment is an active artillery regiment of the Georgia Army National Guard.

== History ==
=== Interwar period ===
==== 214th Coast Artillery (I) ====
The first iteration of the 214th Coast Artillery was constituted in the National Guard in 1921 as the 214th Artillery Regiment (Antiaircraft), Coast Artillery Corps, and allotted to the state of Kentucky. It was redesignated on 1 June 1924 as the 214th Coast Artillery Regiment (Antiaircraft). The allotment of the regiment was withdrawn from the state of Kentucky in March 1926 without ever being organized, and withdrawn from allotment to the National Guard on 17 September 1927 and demobilized.

==== 214th Coast Artillery (II) ====
The second iteration of the 214th Coast Artillery was constituted in the National Guard on 1 May 1939 and allotted to the state of Georgia. The 1st Battalion was organized on 20 October 1939 from elements of the 264th Coast Artillery Battalion (Harbor Defense), with headquarters at Thomson, Georgia. The 2nd Battalion was organized on 29 October 1939 by conversion and redesignation of the 2nd Battalion, 122nd Infantry, with headquarters at Elberton, Georgia. The regimental headquarters was organized and federally recognized on 29 October 1939 at Washington, Georgia. The regiment held annual summer training in 1940 at Fort Barrancas, Florida. It was inducted into active federal service on 25 November 1940 at home stations and transferred to Camp Stewart, Georgia, arriving there on 3 December 1940, where it was assigned to the 38th Coast Artillery Brigade.

=== World War II ===
The 3rd Battalion was activated on 27 May 1942 at Benicia, California. The regiment was broken up and reorganized on Guadalcanal on 11 November 1943 as follows:

- HHB as HHB, 214th Antiaircraft Artillery Group
- 1st Battalion as the 528th Antiaircraft Artillery Gun Battalion
- 2nd Battalion as the 950th Antiaircraft Artillery Automatic Weapons Battalion
- 3rd Battalion as the 250th Antiaircraft Artillery Searchlight Battalion

=== Cold War ===
The 528th AAA Gun Battalion was consolidated with the 101st AAA Automatic Weapons Battalion on 19 July 1946. The 101st, 250th, and 950th Battalions were subsequently consolidated on 1 July 1959 to form the 214th Artillery, a parent regiment under the Combat Arms Regimental System, consisting of the 1st, 2nd, and 4th Gun Battalions, the 3rd Automatic Weapons Battalion, and the 5th Detachment. Reorganized on 1 May 1962 to consist of the 1st Howitzer Battalion, the 3rd Automatic Weapons Battalion, and the 5th Detachment. Reorganized on 16 April 1963 to consist of the 1st Battalion, an element of the 48th Armored Division. Reorganized 1 January 1968 to consist of the 1st and 2nd Battalions. Redesignated on 1 May 1972 as the 214th Field Artillery. Withdrawn on 1 June 1989 from the Combat Arms Regimental System and reorganized under the United States Army Regimental System.

=== Modern ===
The 1-214th FA participated in African Lion 21, a joint training exercise held by the United States Africa Command in Tan-Tan, Morocco, consisting of over 7,000 participants from nine nations and NATO.

== Distinctive unit insignia ==
- Description

A Gold color metal and enamel device 1 1/8 inches (2.9 cm) in height overall consisting of a shield blazoned: Gules, a chevronel debased Azure fimbriated Or, below three shell bursts one and two of the third. Attached below and to the sides of the shield is a Gold scroll inscribed “WE HEAR AND STRIKE” in Red letters.

- Symbolism

The shield is scarlet, the color of the Coast Artillery Corps. The chevronel is blue representing the Infantry service of some of the units, indicating strength. The three shell bursts represent the mission of the Anti-Aircraft Artillery.

- Background

The distinctive unit insignia was originally approved for the 214th Coast Artillery (AA) on 2 July 1940. It was redesignated for the 950th Antiaircraft Artillery Automatic Weapons Battalion on 7 March 1951. It was redesignated for the 214th Artillery Regiment on 25 April 1961. The insignia was redesignated for the 214th Field Artillery Regiment on 31 July 1972.

== Coat of arms ==
=== Blazon ===
- Shield

Gules, a chevronel debased Azure fimbriated Or, below three shell bursts one and two of the third.

- Crest

That for the regiments and separate battalions of the Georgia Army National Guard: On a wreath of the colors Or and Gules, a boar's head erased Gules, in the mouth an oak branch Vert fructed Or.

- Motto "We Hear and Strike"

=== Symbolism ===
- Shield

The shield is scarlet, the color of the Coast Artillery Corps. The chevronel is blue representing the Infantry service of some of the units, indicating strength. The three shell bursts represent the mission of the Anti-Aircraft Artillery.

- Crest

The crest is that of the Georgia Army National Guard.

=== Background ===
The coat of arms was originally approved for the 214th Coast Artillery (AA) on 2 July 1940. It was redesignated for the 950th Antiaircraft Artillery Automatic Weapons Battalion on 7 March 1951. It was redesignated for the 214th Artillery Regiment on 25 April 1961. The insignia was redesignated for the 214th Field Artillery Regiment on 31 July 1972.

== See also ==
- Battle of Guadalcanal order of battle
