= 122nd Infantry Regiment (United States) =

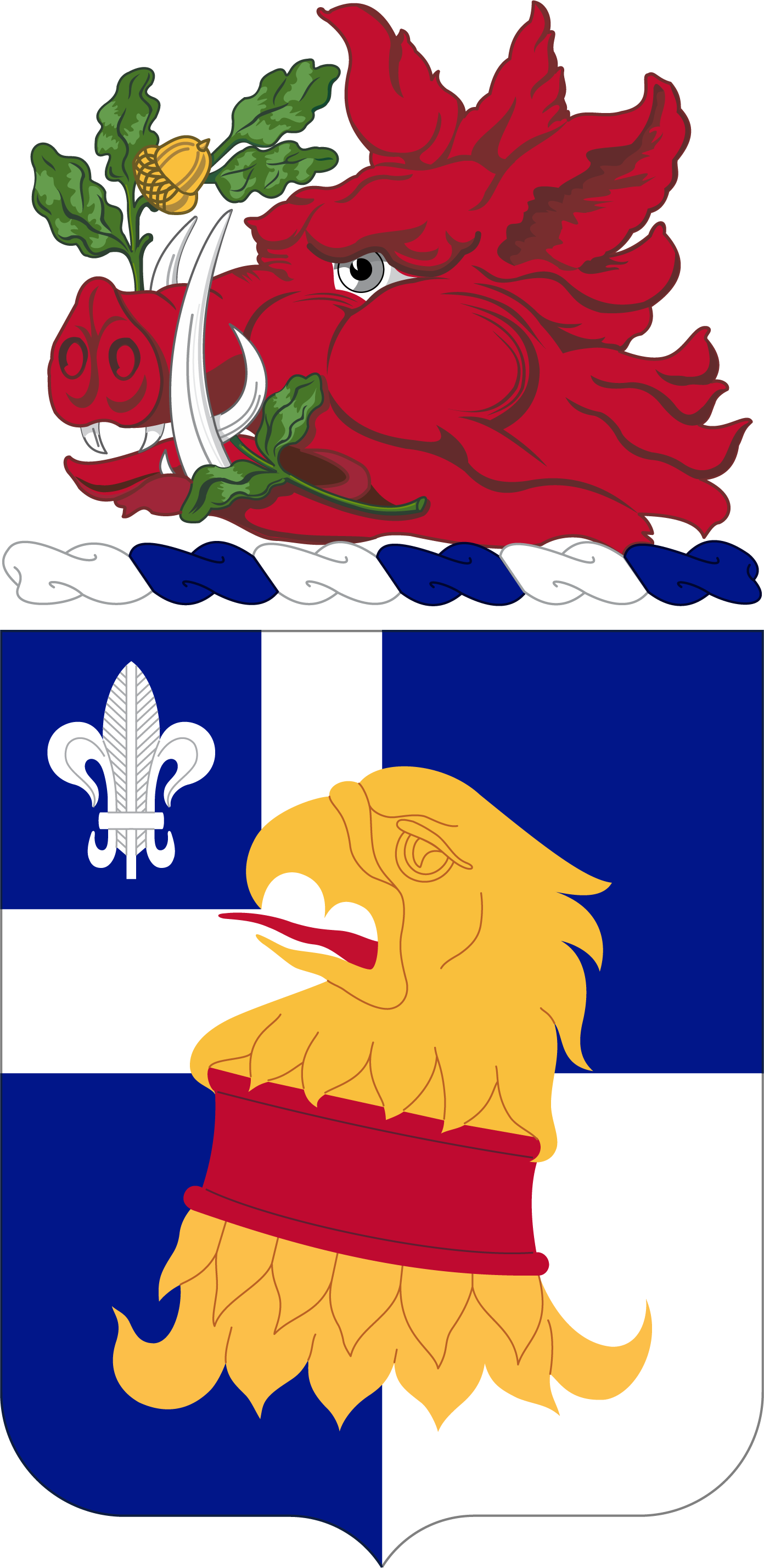
- Coat of arms
- Active: 1857–1865, 1898, 1916–present
- Country: United States
- Allegiance: Georgia
- Branch: Georgia Army National Guard
- Type: Infantry
- Garrison/HQ: Marietta, Georgia
- Motto: Sentinel of Freedom
- Engagements: American Civil War; Spanish–American War; World War I World War II

The 122nd Infantry Regiment is an infantry regiment of the United States Army. It is a component of the Georgia Army National Guard and traces its roots back to the year 1857. It exists today as the 122nd Regiment–Regional Training Institute.

== History ==
The 122nd Infantry Regiment traces lineage to the Gate City Guards in Atlanta. At the time, Atlanta was known as "The Gate City" of the South, because it was a major railroad terminus in the region. In 1857, the Gate City Guard was founded as a private militia company which comprised 100 men and officers.

=== American Civil War ===
In the American Civil War, Georgia voted to secede and join the Confederate States of America and the Gate City Guard was the first to offer their service to the governor, Joseph E. Brown. Traveling to Macon, they joined the 1st Georgia Infantry Regiment. While in the regiment, they fought in the Western Virginia Campaign, particularly in the Battle of Laurel Hill. In early 1862, the regiment's initial period of service expired, but many men continued to fight in different units. The Gate City Guard was eventually reformed in 1877 after the war.

=== Spanish-American War and World War I ===
In 1898, the Gate City Guard was formed into a part of the 5th Georgia Infantry for service in the Spanish–American War, but never saw combat. In 1916, the 5th Georgia was redesignated the 122nd Infantry Regiment and was sent to the Mexico–United States border to protect against raids from Pancho Villa. In 1917, the regiment was put into the 31st Infantry Division, the "Dixie Division," for service in World War I. It went overseas in September 1918. Upon arrival in France, the 31st was designated as a replacement division. The personnel of the 122nd Regiment were withdrawn and sent to other organizations as replacements for combat casualties. The 122nd was part of the Army of Occupation in Southern Germany at Koblenz, at Fort Ehrenbreitstein.

=== Interwar period ===
122nd Infantry Regiment (I)

The 122nd Infantry returned to the United States and was demobilized on 14 January 1919 at Camp Gordon, Georgia. It was reconstituted in the National Guard in 1921, relieved from assignment to the 31st Division and assigned to the 30th Division. On 27 April 1922, it was reorganized by the redesignation of the 1st Infantry, Georgia National Guard. On 9 June 1924, it was redesignated the 121st Infantry Regiment.

122nd Infantry Regiment (II) (Separate)

On 27 February 1924, the 2nd Battalion, 122nd Infantry was expanded and redesignated as the 200th Infantry Regiment (Separate), with the regimental headquarters organized on 10 March 1924 and federally recognized at Atlanta, Georgia. The 1st Battalion was concurrently allotted to the Idaho National Guard and organized by redesignation of the 3rd Battalion, 186th Infantry Regiment, the allotment of which was then transferred to the Oregon National Guard for reorganization. The Georgia elements of the regiment were redesignated the 122nd Infantry on 9 June 1924, and all World War I honors were retained by that organization.

Concurrently, elements of the 200th Infantry Regiment allotted to Georgia were withdrawn and allotted to the Idaho National Guard as inactive units; the 1st Battalion in Idaho was converted, reorganized, expanded, and redesignated as elements of the 116th Engineer Regiment on 1 August 1926, rendering all elements of the 200th Infantry inactive.

On 1 July 1939, the 122nd Infantry Regiment (less the 3rd Battalion) was reorganized and redesignated as the 179th Field Artillery Regiment, while the 3rd Battalion, 122nd Infantry was converted and redesignated as the 2nd Battalion, 214th Coast Artillery Regiment.

== Cold War to present ==
In 1947, the 122nd Infantry Regiment was reorganized and assigned to the 48th Infantry Division until 1955, when it was redesignated as the 48th Armored Division. Since then, it has served as a training unit for the Army National Guard. It runs the modern Georgia Military Institute in Marietta, Georgia.
