= 171st Aviation Regiment =

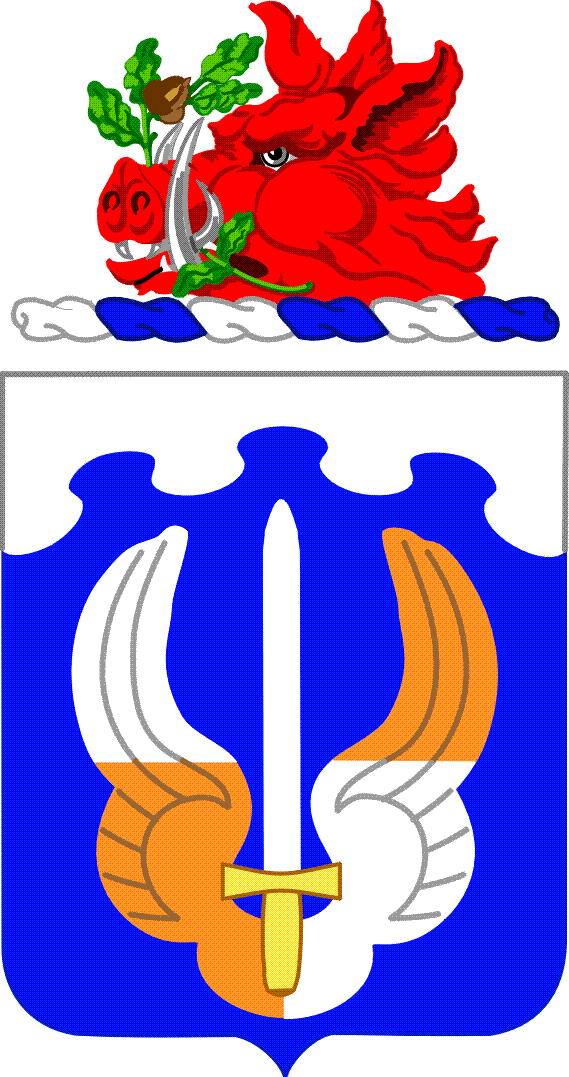
- Coat of Arms
- Active: 1995 - present
- Country: United States of America
- Branch: United States Army Aviation Branch
- Type: Aviation

Aircraft flown
- Utility helicopter: UH-60L Black Hawk

The 171st Aviation Regiment is an aviation regiment of the U.S. Army.

The regiment was constituted 8 June 1995 as the 171st Aviation, a parent regiment under the United States Army Regimental System and allotted to the Army National Guard of Georgia and Florida. It was organized on 1 September 1996, to consist of the 1st Battalion with headquarters at Winder, Georgia.

On 3 March 2001, a Short C-23B+ Sherpa (Shorts 360), 93-1336, of Det. 1, H Company, 171st Aviation Regiment, Florida Army National Guard, based at Lakeland Linder International Airport, crashed during heavy rainstorms around 1100 hrs. in Unadilla, Georgia. All 21 people on board were killed. The aircraft was en route from Hurlburt Field, Florida to NAS Oceana, Virginia with a Virginia Beach-based USAF RED HORSE engineer detachment on board who had been training at Hurlburt.

== Structure ==
CH-47F Chinook helicopter, with the 1st Battalion, 171st Aviation Regiment, Hawaii Army National Guard

- 1st Battalion (General Support) at General Lucius D. Clay National Guard Center, Dobbins Air Reserve Base, GA (GA ARNG)
  - Headquarters and Headquarters Company
    - Detachment 1 at Wheeler Army Airfield, HI (HI ARNG)
    - Detachment 2 at Rochester, NY from the 642d Aviation Support Battalion (NY ARNG)
    - Detachment 5 at E. J. Garn Aviation Complex - Utah Army National Guard, South Valley Regional Airport, West Jordan, UT (UT ARNG)
  - Company A (UH-60L) at General Lucius D. Clay National Guard Center (GA ARNG)
  - Company B (UH-60) at Wheeler Army Airfield, HI (HI ARNG)
    - Iraq 2004-2005
  - Company C at New Mexico Army National Guard Army Aviation Support Facility #1 (UH-60), Santa Fe Municipal Airport (NM ARNG)
    - Detachment 1 at Minnesota Army National Guard Army Aviation Support Facility #2, St. Cloud Regional Airport, MN (MN ARNG)
    - Detachment 2 at E. J. Garn Aviation Complex - Utah Army National Guard, South Valley Regional Airport, West Jordan, UT (UT ARNG)
    - Detachment ? New York Army National Guard "Genny Dustoff"
  - Company D
    - Detachment 1 at General Lucius D. Clay National Guard Center (GA ARNG)
    - Detachment 2 at Rochester, NY from the 642d Aviation Support Battalion (NY ARNG)
  - Company E
    - Detachment 1 at Rochester, NY from the 642d Aviation Support Battalion (NY ARNG)
    - Detachment 2 at General Lucius D. Clay National Guard Center (GA ARNG)
  - Company F (UH-60)
    - Detachment 2 (SC ARNG)
  - Company H (UH-60) Robins Air Force Base, GA (GA ARNG)
    - Detachment 1 at Florida Army National Guard Army Aviation Support Facility #2, Brooksville-Tampa Bay Regional Airport (FL ARNG)
    - Detachment 2 at Army Aviation Support Facility, Austin-Bergstrom International Airport (TX ARNG)
    - Detachment 3 at Boone National Guard Center, Frankfort, KY (KY ARNG)
