= 118th Field Artillery Regiment =

- Country: (United States)
- Branch: United States Army
- Type: Field artillery
- Role: USARS parent regiment
- Size: regiment

The 118th Field Artillery Regiment is a field artillery regiment of the Georgia Army National Guard. The regiment's 1st Battalion is the cannon battalion assigned to the 48th Infantry Brigade Combat Team. It is one of several National Guard units with colonial roots and campaign credit for the War of 1812.

== History ==
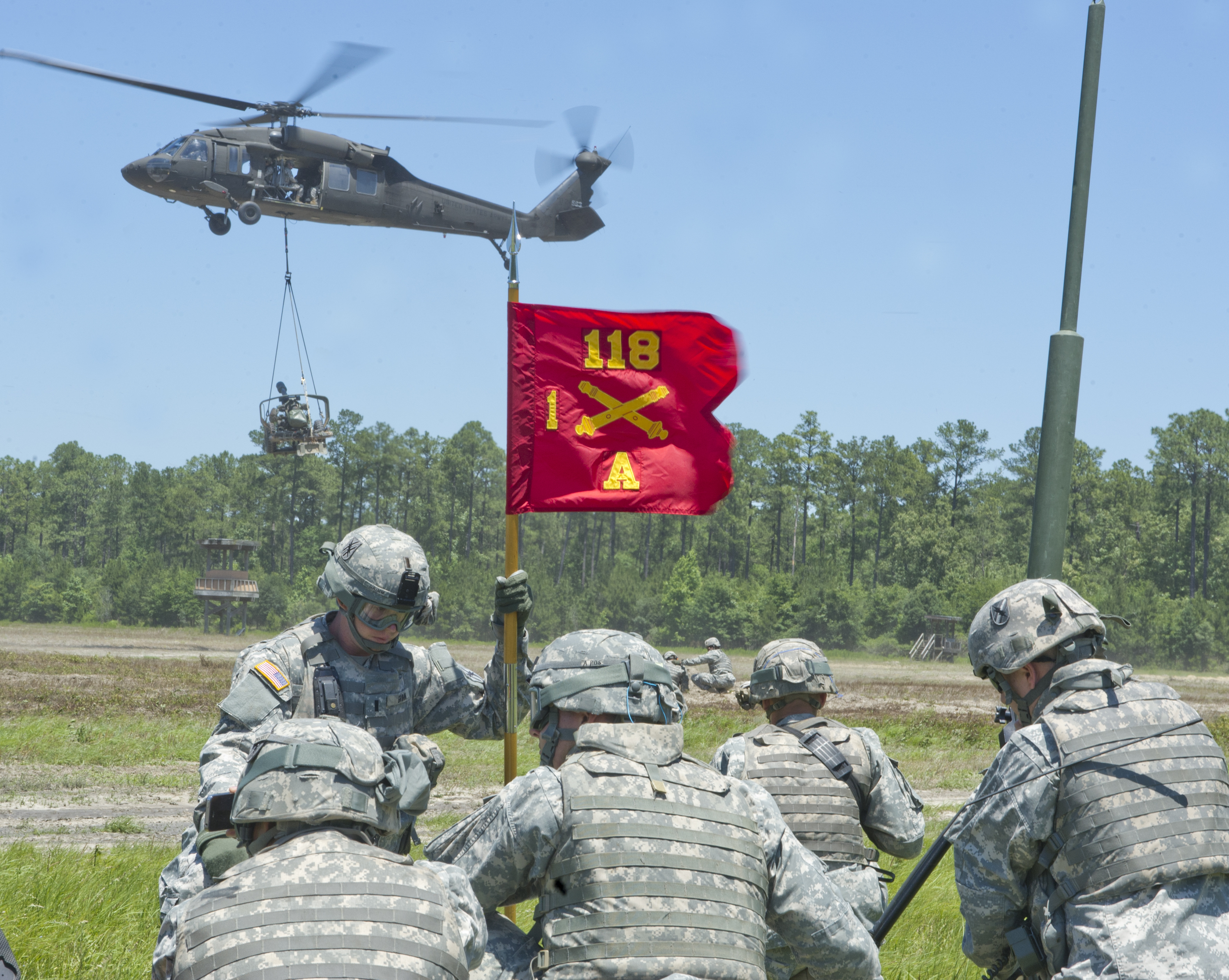
118th Field Artillery Regiment soldiers

In September 2015, the battalion reactivated a third firing battery, Battery C, equipped with 155mm M777 howitzers as part of Army-wide restructuring.

In 2016, Battery A, 1st Battalion, earned first place in the National Guard Small Unit category of the Army Award for Maintenance Excellence.

== Lineage and honors ==
=== Lineage ===
- Organized 18 April 1751 in the Georgia Militia in the District of Savannah as four independent volunteer companies, three of foot and one of horse.
- Mustered into service of the colony 11 June 1751 at Savannah under the command of Captain Noble Jones.
- Reorganized 2 April 1757 as the 1st Regiment of Foot Militia, Division of Savannah, under the command of Colonel Noble Jones.
- Reorganized in January 1776 with two battalions (Savannah and Christ Church Parish in the 1st Battalion).
- Disbanded 29 January 1778 at Savannah when the British captured the city.
- Reorganized in 1782 in the Georgia Militia as the 1st Regiment (Savannah and Chatham County in the 1st Battalion), 1st Brigade, 1st Division.
- 1st Battalion (Chatham Battalion), 1st Regiment, expanded, reorganized and redesignated in 1784 as the 1st Regiment (Chatham Regiment), 1st Brigade, 1st Division.
- Reorganized in March 1793 to consist of the 1st (or City) Battalion in Savannah and the 2d (or County) Battalion in Chatham County.
- Reorganized wholly in Savannah in December 1807.

(Savannah Volunteer Guards [organized in 1802] and Republican Blues [organized in 1808] mustered into Federal service in east Florida in June 1812 as elements of Colonel Daniel Newman’s provisional battalion of Georgia Volunteers; mustered out of Federal service in October 1812. Heavy Artillery Company [organized in 1812] mustered into Federal service 19 October 1812 at Fort Jackson, Georgia; mustered out of Federal service 23 November 1812.)

- Mustered into Federal service 22 January 1815 at Savannah as the 1st Regiment, Georgia Volunteers; mustered out of Federal service 23 February 1815.

(Volunteer companies in the 1st Regiment, Georgia Militia, reorganized 13 December 1829 as the Chatham Legion.)
(Irish Jasper Greens [organized in 1842] mustered into Federal service 12 June 1846 at Columbus as Company F, 1st Regiment, Georgia Volunteers; mustered out of Federal service 26 May 1847 at New Orleans, Louisiana.)

- Volunteer companies (Chatham Legion) withdrawn 20 January 1852 from the 1st Regiment and reorganized as the Independent Volunteer Battalion of Savannah to include the following companies: Chatham Artillery (organized in 1785); Savannah Volunteer Guards (organized in 1802); Republican Blues (organized in 1808); Phoenix Riflemen (organized in 1812); Irish Jasper Greens (organized in 1842); German Volunteers (organized in 1845); and the DeKalb Riflemen (organized in 1850); 1st Regiment, Georgia Militia, reorganized with new companies— hereafter separate lineage.
- Independent Volunteer Battalion of Savannah reorganized and redesignated 17 May 1856 as the Independent Volunteer Regiment of Savannah.
- Redesignated 20 December 1859 as the 1st Volunteer Regiment of Georgia.
- Ordered into active state service 2 January 1861 to take possession of Fort Pulaski in the Savannah harbor.
- Mustered into Confederate service by elements May–July 1861 at Savannah.

(Chatham Artillery detached from the regiment 28 September 1861 and reorganized as an independent light battery [Claghorn’s or Wheaton’s Georgia Battery]; surrendered 26 April 1865 near Greensboro, North Carolina.)

- Portion of the regiment captured 11 April 1862 at the surrender of Fort Pulaski.

(Savannah Volunteer Guards detached from the regiment 11 April 1862 and expanded, reorganized, and redesignated as the 18th Battalion, Georgia Infantry; surrendered 26 April 1865 at Appomattox Court House, Virginia.)
(Phoenix Riflemen detachment from the regiment 11 April 1862 and expanded, reorganized, and redesignated as the 13th Battalion, Georgia Infantry; absorbed 23 December 1862 by the 63d Georgia Volunteer Infantry Regiment—(see below.)

- Regiment reorganized in October 1862 as the 1st Georgia Volunteer Infantry Regiment upon exchange of elements at Fort Pulaski.
- Consolidated in April 1865 with the 57th and 63d Georgia Volunteer Infantry Regiments and redesignated as the 1st Georgia Composite Infantry Regiment.
- Surrendered 26 April 1865 near Durham, North Carolina.
- Former 1st Volunteer Regiment (Chatham Regiment) of Georgia reorganized 26 September 1872 in the Georgia Volunteers at Savannah as the 1st Infantry Regiment.
- Elements consolidated with elements of the 2d and 4th Infantry Regiments and mustered into Federal service 11 May 1898 at Griffin as the 1st Georgia Volunteer Infantry; mustered out of Federal service 18 November 1898 at Macon and resumed state status as the 1st Regiment of Infantry.

(Georgia Volunteers redesignated 21 December 1899 as the Georgia State Troops; redesignated 1 October 1905 as the Georgia National Guard.)

- Drafted into Federal service 5 August 1917.
- Converted and redesignated 23 September 1917 as the 118th Field Artillery and assigned to the 31st Division.
- Demobilized 14–18 January 1919 at Camp Gordon, Georgia.
- Reorganized in 1921 in the Georgia National Guard as the 1st Field Artillery; Headquarters Federally recognized 30 December 1921 at Savannah.
- Redesignated 27 April 1922 as the 118th Field Artillery and assigned to the 30th Division.

(Battery A [Chatham Artillery] withdrawn 17 April 1925 and reorganized as Headquarters and Headquarters Battery, 55th Field Artillery Brigade.)

- 118th Field Artillery and Headquarters and Headquarters Battery, 55th Field Artillery Brigade, inducted into Federal service 16 September 1940 at Savannah.
- Headquarters and Headquarters Battery, 55th Field Artillery Brigade, reorganized and redesignated 7 February 1942 as Headquarters and Headquarters Battery (Georgia part), 30th Division Artillery; 118th Field Artillery concurrently broken up and its elements reorganized and redesignated as elements of the 30th Infantry Division as follows: Headquarters and Headquarters Battery and the 1st Battalion as the 118th Field Artillery Battalion; 2d Battalion as the 230th Field Artillery Battalion.

(Headquarters and Headquarters Battery, 30th Division Artillery, inactivated 20 November 1945 at Fort Jackson, South Carolina. Redesignated 5 July 1946 as Headquarters and Headquarters Battery (Georgia part), 48th Division Artillery. Reorganized and Federally recognized 18 June 1947 at Savannah. Reorganized and redesignated 1 November 1955 as Headquarters and Headquarters Battery, 48th Armored Division Artillery.)
(118th Field Artillery Battalion inactivated 20 November 1945 at Fort Jackson, South Carolina. Relieved 5 July 1946 from assignment to the 30th Infantry Division. Reorganized and Federally recognized 21 April 1947 at Savannah. Reorganized and redesignated 1 November 1955 as the 118th Armored Field Artillery Battalion and assigned to the 48th Armored Division.)
(230th Field Artillery Battalion inactivated 20 November 1945 at Fort Jackson, South Carolina. Relieved 5 July 1946 from assignment to the 30th Infantry Division and assigned to the 48th Infantry Division. Reorganized and Federally recognized 22 April 1947 at Savannah. Reorganized and redesignated 1 November 1955 as the 230th Armored Field Artillery Battalion, an element of the 48th Armored Division.

- 118th and 230th Armored Field Artillery Battalions consolidated 1 July 1959 to form the 118th Artillery, a parent regiment under the Combat Arms Regimental System, to consist of the 1st and 2d Howitzer Battalions, elements of the 48th Armored Division.
- Reorganized 16 April 1963 to consist of the 1st, 2d, and 3d Battalions, elements of the 48th Armored Division.
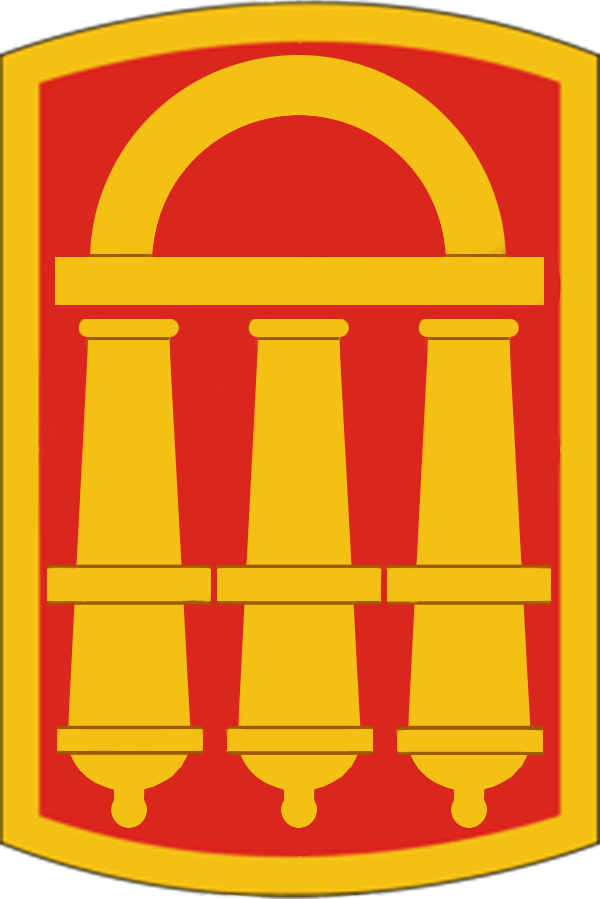
- 118th Field Artillery Brigade SSI
  Regiment broken up 1 January 1968 and its elements reorganized and redesignated as follows: Headquarters, Headquarters and Service Battery, 1st Battalion, consolidated with Headquarters and Headquarters Battery, 48th Armored Division Artillery (see above), and consolidated unit reorganized and redesignated as Headquarters and Headquarters Battery, 118th Artillery Group (remainder of regiment—hereafter separate lineage).
- Redesignated 1 May 1972 as Headquarters and Headquarters Battery, 118th Field Artillery Group.
- Redesignated 9 May 1978 as Headquarters and Headquarters Battery, 118th Field Artillery Brigade.
- Consolidated 1 September 1992 with the 230th Field Artillery (see ANNEX) to form the 118th Field Artillery, a parent regiment under the United States Army Regimental System, to consist of the 1st Battalion, an element of the 48th Infantry Brigade.

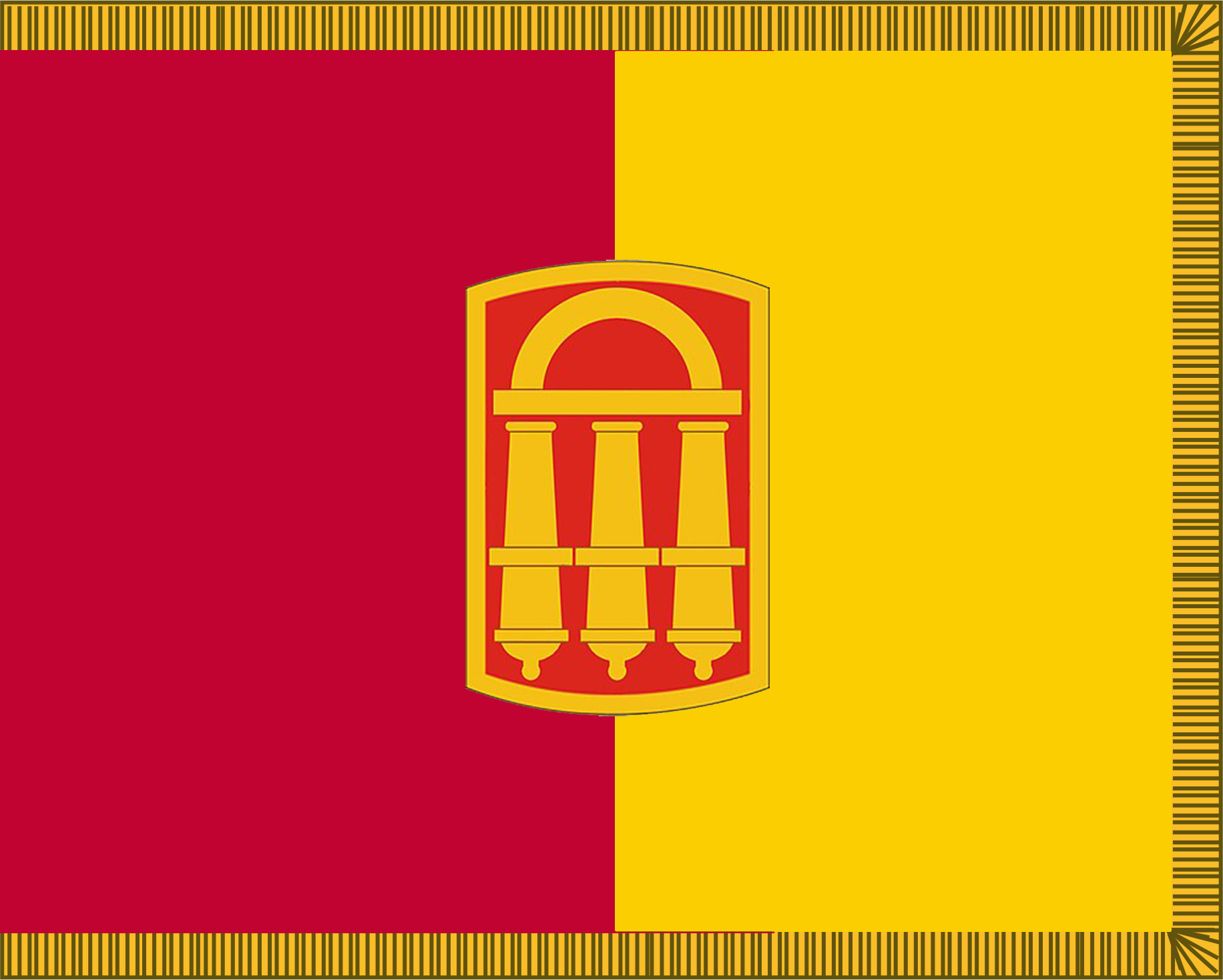
118th Field Artillery Brigade Flag

ANNEX

- Constituted 14 December 1967 in the Georgia Army National Guard as the 230th Artillery, a parent regiment under the Combat Arms Regimental System.
- Organized 1 January 1968 from existing units to consist of the 1st Battalion, an element of the 30th Infantry Division.
- Redesignated 1 May 1972 as the 230th Field Artillery.
- Reorganized 1 December 1973 to consist of the 1st Battalion, an element of the 48th Infantry Brigade.
- Withdrawn 1 June 1989 from the Combat Arms Regimental System and reorganized under the United States Army Regimental System.

(1st Battalion ordered into active Federal service 30 November 1990 at home stations; released 27 March 1991 from active Federal service and reverted to state control.)

=== Campaign participation credit ===
- Revolutionary War: Savannah; Georgia 1776; Florida 1778
- War of 1812: Streamer without inscription
- Civil War (Confederate service): Atlanta; Georgia 1861; Georgia 1862; South Carolina 1862; South Carolina 1863; North Carolina 1865
- World War I: Streamer without inscription
- World War II: Normandy; Northern France; Rhineland; Ardennes-Alsace; Central Europe

Headquarters Battery (Chatham Artillery, Savannah), 1st Battalion, additionally entitled to:
- Civil War (Confederate service): Peninsula; Sharpsburg; Gettysburg; Petersburg; Appomattox; Maryland 1863; Florida 1864
- War with Spain: Santiago
- World War II – AP: East Indies; Papua; New Guinea; Luzon

Battery A (Effingham Hussars, Springfield), 1st Battalion, additionally entitled to:
- Civil War (Confederate service): Florida 1864

Battery B (Savannah Volunteer Guards/Irish Jasper Greens), 1st Battalion, additionally entitled to:
- Civil War (Confederate service): Appomattox; Florida 1864;
- Southwest Asia: Defense of Saudi Arabia; Liberation and Defense of Kuwait; Cease-Fire

Battery C (Savannah Volunteer Guards), 1st Battalion, additionally entitled to:
- Civil War (Confederate service): Appomattox

Service Battery (Brunswick Rifles), 1st Battalion, additionally entitled to:
- Civil War (Confederate service): Peninsula; Second Manassas; Sharpsburg; Chancellorsville; Gettysburg; Wilderness; Spotsylvania; Cold Harbor; Appomattox

=== Decorations ===
- Meritorious Unit Commendation (Army), Streamer embroidered UNITED KINGDOM (Headquarters and Headquarters Battery, 30th Division Artillery, cited; DA GO 100, 30th Infantry Division, 10 May 1945)
- Meritorious Unit Commendation (Army), Streamer embroidered UNITED KINGDOM–FRANCE (Headquarters and Headquarters Battery, 118th Field Artillery Battalion, cited; GO 100, 30th Infantry Division, 10 May 1945)
- Meritorious Unit Commendation (Army), Streamer embroidered BELGIUM-HOLLAND- GERMANY (Headquarters and Headquarters Battery, 30th Division Artillery, cited; GO 129, 30th Infantry Division, 23 May 1945)
- Meritorious Unit Commendation (Army), Streamer embroidered EUROPEAN THEATER (Headquarters and Headquarters Battery, 230th Field Artillery Battalion, cited; GO 100, 30th Infantry Division, 10 May 1945)
- French Croix de Guerre with Palm, World War II, Streamer embroidered FRANCE (30th Infantry Division cited; DA GO 14, 1959)
- Belgian Fourragere 1940 (Headquarters and Headquarters Battery, 30th Division Artillery, and 118th and 230th Field Artillery Battalions cited; DA GO 43, 1950)
  - Cited in the Order of the Day of the Belgian Army for action in Belgium 1940 (Headquarters and Headquarters Battery, 30th Division Artillery, and 118th and 230th Field Artillery Battalions cited; DA GO 43, 1950)
  - Cited in the Order of the Day of the Belgian Army for action in the Ardennes 1940 (Headquarters and Headquarters Battery, 30th Division Artillery, and 118th and 230th Field Artillery Battalions cited; DA GO 43, 1950)

Headquarters Battery (Chatham Artillery, Savannah), 1st Battalion, additionally entitled to:
- Presidential Unit Citation (Army), Streamer embroidered PAPUA (Papuan Forces, United States Army, Southwest Pacific Area, cited; WD GO 21, 1943)
- Philippine Presidential Unit Citation, Streamer embroidered 17 OCTOBER 1944 TO 4 JULY 1945 (101st Antiaircraft Artillery Automatic Weapons Battalion cited; DA GO 47, 1950)

Battery B (Savannah Volunteer Guards/Irish Jasper Greens), 1st Battalion, additionally entitled to:
- Meritorious Unit Commendation (Army), Streamer embroidered SOUTHWEST ASIA (165th Supply Company cited; DA GO 27, 1994)

== See also ==
- Field Artillery Branch (United States)
- Army National Guard
- National Guard of the United States
- Georgia Army National Guard
