= Barrow County Airport =

Airport in Georgia, United States

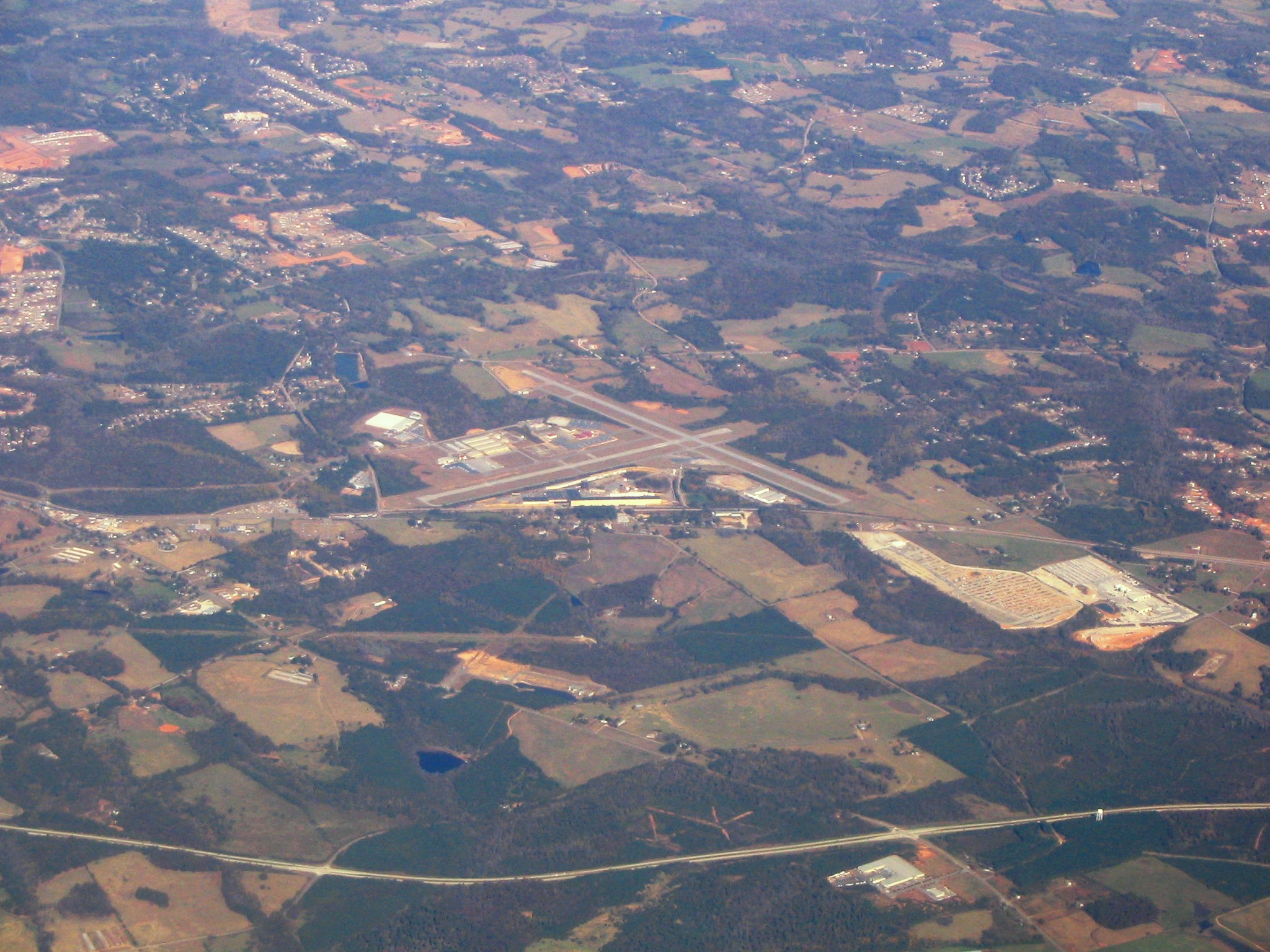
- Aerial view, November 2005
- IATA: WDR; ICAO: KWDR; FAA LID: WDR

Summary
- Airport type: Public
- Owner: Barrow County Airport Authority
- Serves: Winder, Georgia
- Elevation AMSL: 934 ft (285 m)
- Coordinates: 33°58′58″N 083°40′03″W
- Website: www.WDRairport.com

Map
- Location of airport in Georgia WDR (the United States)

Runways
Direction	Length		Surface
Direction	ft	m	Surface
13/31	5,202	1,586	Asphalt
5/23	3,607	1,099	Asphalt

Statistics (2022)
- Aircraft operations: 50,000
- Based aircraft: 115
- Sources: FAA and airport website

Barrow County Airport (IATA: WDR, ICAO: KWDR, FAA LID: WDR) is a public use airport located three nautical miles (6 km) east of the central business district of Winder, a city in Barrow County, Georgia, United States. It is owned by the Barrow County Airport Authority. This airport is included in the National Plan of Integrated Airport Systems for 2011–2015, which categorized it as a general aviation facility.

The airport was previously known as Northeast Georgia Regional Airport and prior to December 2005 it was known as Winder-Barrow Airport. It is home to Dragonfly Aviation, and the 148th medical company (air ambulance) of the Georgia Army National Guard.

== Facilities and aircraft ==
Barrow County Airport covers an area of 374 acres (151 ha) at an elevation of 934 feet (285 m) above mean sea level. It has two asphalt paved runways: 13/31 is 5,202 by 100 feet (1,586 x 30 m) and 5/23 is 3,607 by 100 feet (1,099 x 30 m) Runway 13/31 has an instrument landing system.

For the 12-month period ending December 31, 2022, the airport had 50,000 aircraft operations, an average of 137 per day: 90% general aviation and 10% military. At that time there were 115 aircraft based at this airport: 86 single-engine, 19 multi-engine, 2 jet, 3 helicopter, and 5 military.

== Accidents and incidents ==
- On March 25, 2022, a Cessna 172 Skyhawk crashed while practicing touch-and-go landings at the airport. The flight instructor and student pilot completed several runs and on the final circuit, while on the final approach, the student pilot turned the yoke and felt a sensation like the aileron cable disconnecting. The flight instructor took control of the airplane and noted that he could turn the control yoke 360° without a response from the airplane. Having no aileron control, the airplane veered to the right and descended into trees. A post-impact fire ensued that destroyed the airplane. Examination of the wreckage revealed that there was a break in the aileron control cable system near the right control column. Maintenance personnel's failure to detect the damaged aileron cable during the most recent inspections, which resulted in the separation of the aileron control cable and subsequent loss of airplane control.

== See also ==
- List of airports in Georgia (U.S. state)
