= 121st Infantry Regiment (United States) =

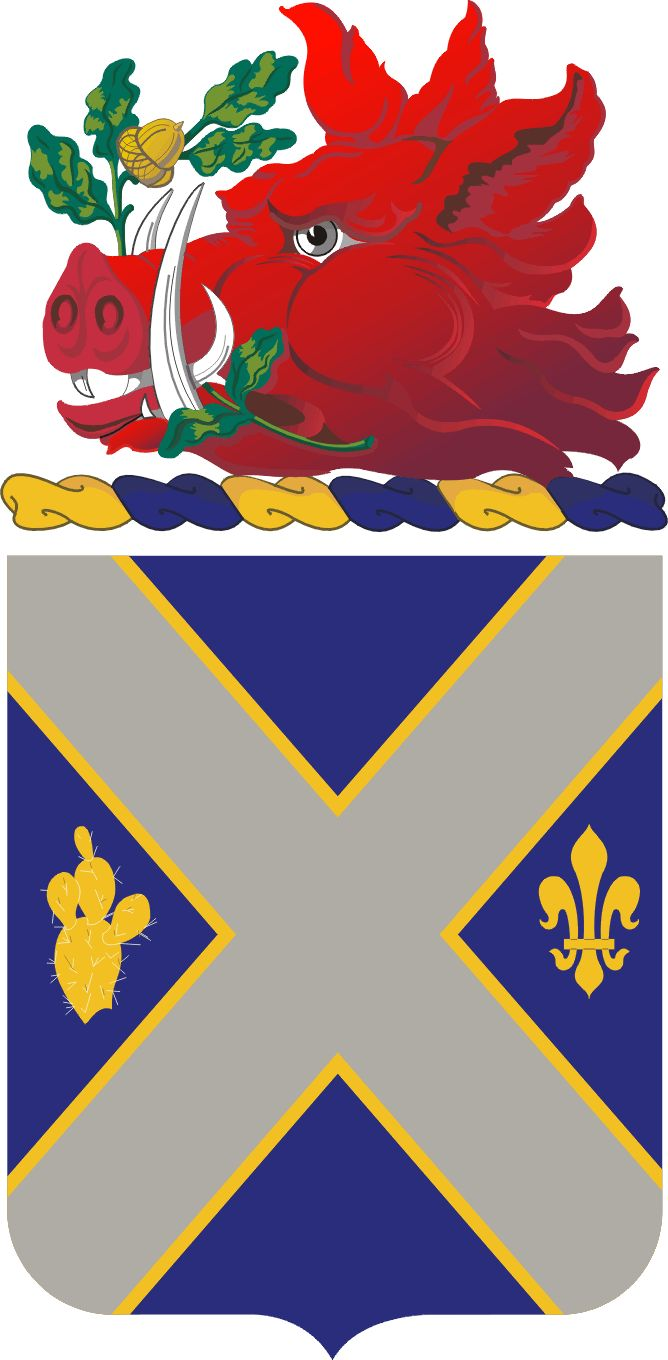
- Coat of arms
- Active: 1916–present
- Country: United States
- Allegiance: Georgia
- Branch: (United States Army) Georgia Army National Guard
- Type: Regiment
- Role: Infantry
- Nickname: "Old Gray Bonnet"
- Motto: Faciendum Est (It Shall Be Done)
- Engagements: World War I World War II; War in Iraq; War in Afghanistan

Insignia
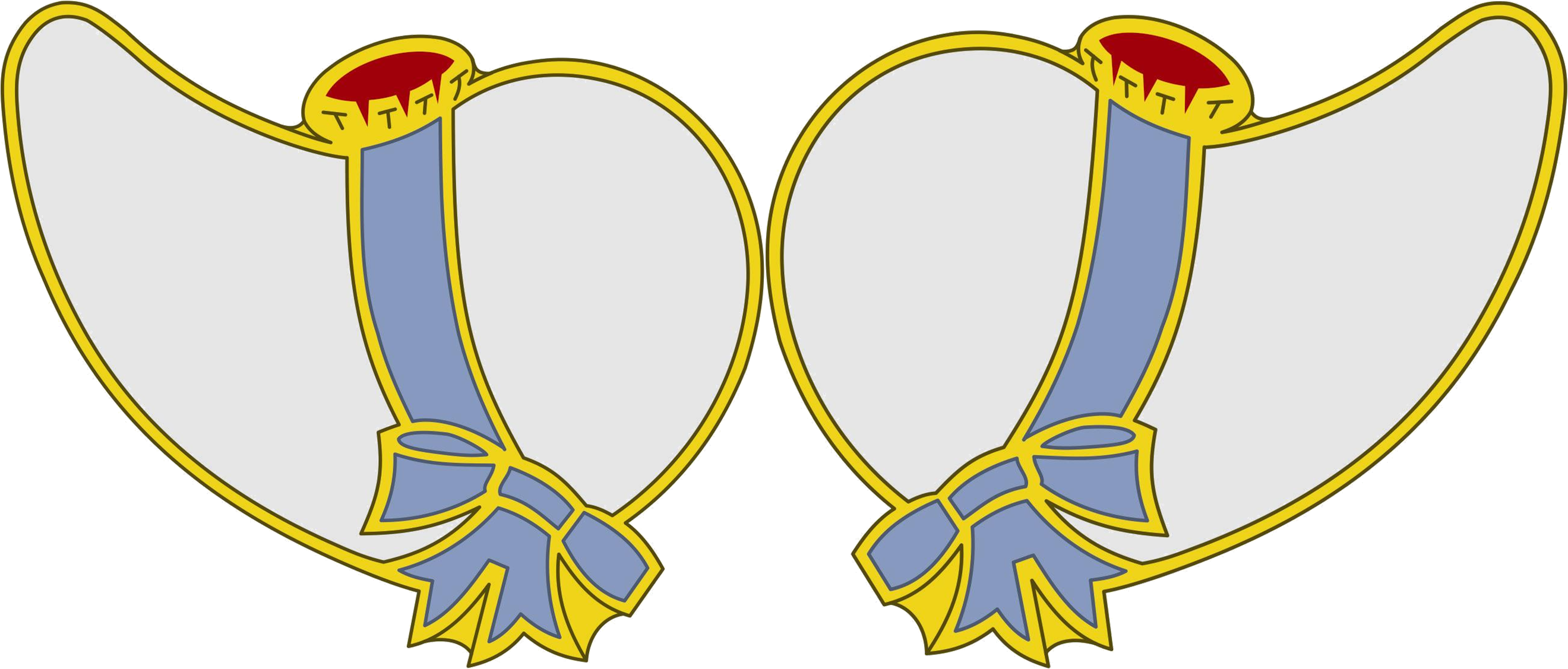
- Distinctive unit insignia

The 121st Infantry Regiment is an infantry regiment of the Georgia National Guard that saw combat service in the First and Second World Wars. As a result of army-wide reorganization in the 1950s, the 121st Infantry ceased to exist as a single unit; today, various units of the Georgia National Guard trace their lineage to the 121st Infantry.

== History ==
The 121st Infantry Regiment was formed from the 2nd Georgia Infantry Regiment in 1916 and assigned to the 31st Division. During World War One, the 121st was assigned to the 61st Infantry Brigade of the 31st Division. The units of the 31st Division, including the 121st Infantry, were broken up upon arrival at Brest and used to provide replacements for other units at the front lines in France. The regiment was demobilized on 14 January 1919 at Fort Gordon, Georgia.

The 121st Infantry was reconstituted in the National Guard in 1921 and allotted to Georgia, and concurrently relieved from the 31st Division and assigned to the 30th Division. It was reorganized on 27 April 1922 by the redesignation of the 1st Infantry, Georgia National Guard (organized 2 August–1919 November 1920 as 2nd Battalion, 1st Infantry; battalion expanded and reorganized 31 May 1921 as the 1st Infantry, with headquarters concurrently organized and federally recognized at Macon) as the 122nd Infantry). It was redesignated the 121st Infantry on 9 June 1924. The regiment, or elements thereof, called up to perform the following state duties: entire regiment (already on active duty for training during the hurricane that struck its camp at Tybee Island) for hurricane relief in July 1925 in southeast Georgia; entire regiment for riot control during the textile workers’ strike in Griffin, Jackson, and Rome, Georgia, 16–24 September 1934. A regimental contingent was sent to Washington, D.C., to march in the inaugural parade of President Franklin D. Roosevelt on 4 March 1933. Conducted annual summer training at numerous locations to include: St. Simons Island and Tybee Island, Georgia, Camp McClellan, Alabama, Camp Jackson, South Carolina, and Camp Foster, Florida. Inducted into active federal service at Macon, 16 September 1940, and moved to Fort Jackson, South Carolina, where it arrived 23 September 1940. Relieved from the 30th Division on 22 November 1941 and assigned to the 8th Division.

The regiment was briefly organized as a motorized infantry regiment before reverting to traditional infantry organization prior to shipping overseas. The 121st Infantry subsequently saw combat with the 8th Infantry Division in the European Theater of Operations during 1944–45. The regiment returned from World War II at the Boston port of entry on 11 July 1945 and then moved to Fort Leonard Wood, Missouri, where it was inactivated on 20 October 1945. In September 1946, the 121st Infantry Regiment was assigned to the 48th Infantry Division, a national guard division headquartered in Jacksonville, Florida. In 1955, this division became the 48th Armored Division and moved its headquarters to Macon, Georgia. As a result of this reorganization, the 121st Infantry Regiment ceased to exist as a tactical organization. Some elements of the 121st Infantry were transferred to the 162nd Tank Battalion in May 1956. As the army adopted the Pentomic structure in the late 1950s, infantry regiments were broken up and the component battalions reassigned to brigade headquarters while still retaining the number of their former regiment in their titles. Thus, while the 121st Infantry has not existed as a separate tactical organization since the mid-1950s, some Georgia National Guard battalions, such as 2nd Battalion, 121st Infantry Regiment are still affiliated with the regiment, but assigned to brigades such as the 48th Infantry Brigade for purposes of tactical organization.

Battalions of the former 121st Infantry were assigned to the 48th Armored Division from 1959 until 1968, the 30th Infantry Division from 1968 through 1973, and 48th Infantry Brigade from 30 November 1973 to present.

== Distinctive unit insignia ==
The regimental nickname "The Gray Bonnets" is derived from the title of a song, "Put on Your Old Gray Bonnets" adopted in 1928 as the official air, or marching song, of the regiment. The distinctive unit insignia of the regiment is an "Old Gray Bonnet" proper, and is one of the few DUIs in the U.S. Army designed to be manufactured and worn in pairs (left and right).

The insignia is a blue shield with a gray saltire cross and a prickly pear and fleur-de-lis, and a boar's Head with an oak branch in its mouth on top. The blue background represents the Infantry while the gray cross symbolizes the unit's Confederate service. The cactus represents duty on the Mexican border, and the fleur-de-lis service in France during World War I. The boar's head with oak branch is the crest of the Georgia Army National Guard.

The distinctive unit insignia was originally approved for the 121st Regiment Infantry, Georgia National Guard on 27 June 1928. It was amended to permit manufacturing in pairs on 16 August 1928. It was redesignated for the 162d Tank Battalion, Georgia National Guard on 24 May 1956. The insignia was redesignated for the 121st Infantry, Georgia National Guard on 17 April 1961.

== 2nd Battalion, 121st Infantry Regiment ==
2nd Battalion, 121st Infantry Regiment
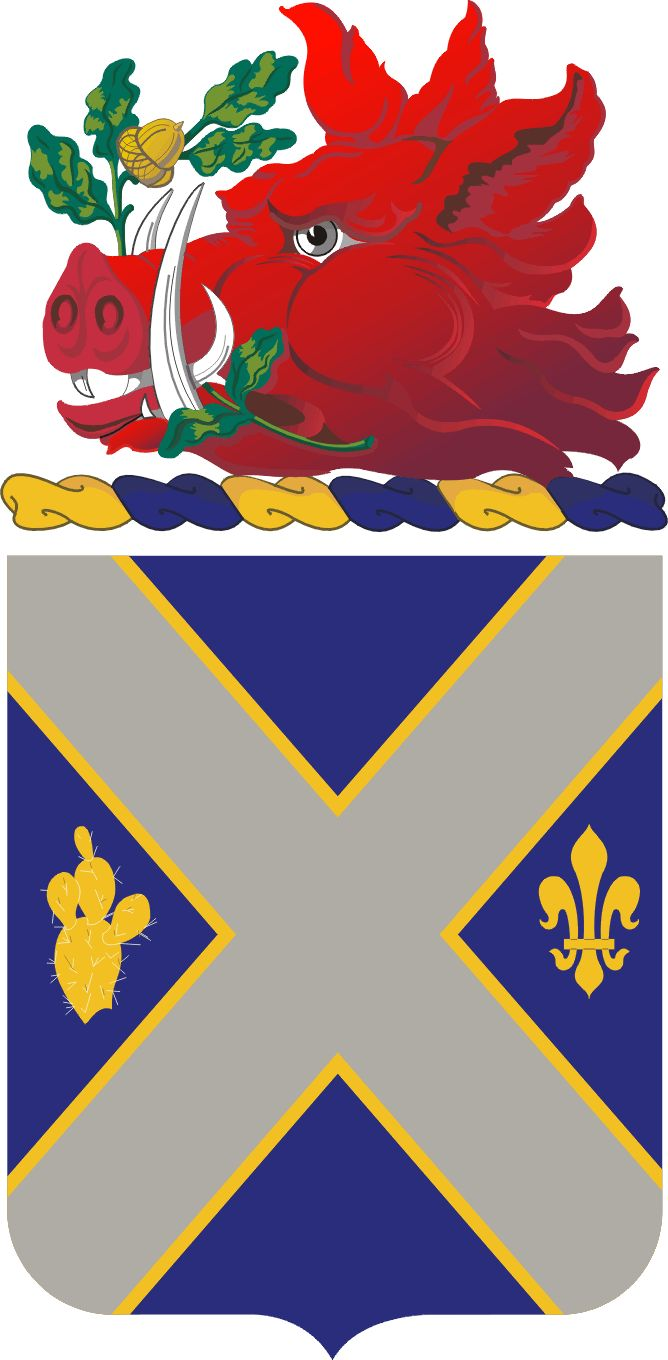
- 121st Infantry Regiment coat of arms
- Active: 1810–present
- Country: United States
- Allegiance: State of Georgia
- Branch: Army National Guard
- Type: Regiment
- Role: Light infantry
- Size: Battalion
- Part of: 48th Infantry Brigade Combat Team
- Garrison/HQ: Forsyth, Georgia
- Nicknames: "Warriors", The 2nd Foot
- Mottos: Faciendum Est, "It shall be done"
- Engagements: Seminole War, Mexican–American War, Civil War (Confederate Service), World War I, World War II, Iraq Campaign, Afghanistan Campaign
- Decorations: Meritorious Unit Commendation, Presidential Unit Citation

Commanders
- Current commander: LTC Daniel Sekula
- Command Sergeant Major: MSG (P) Justice Bailey

Insignia
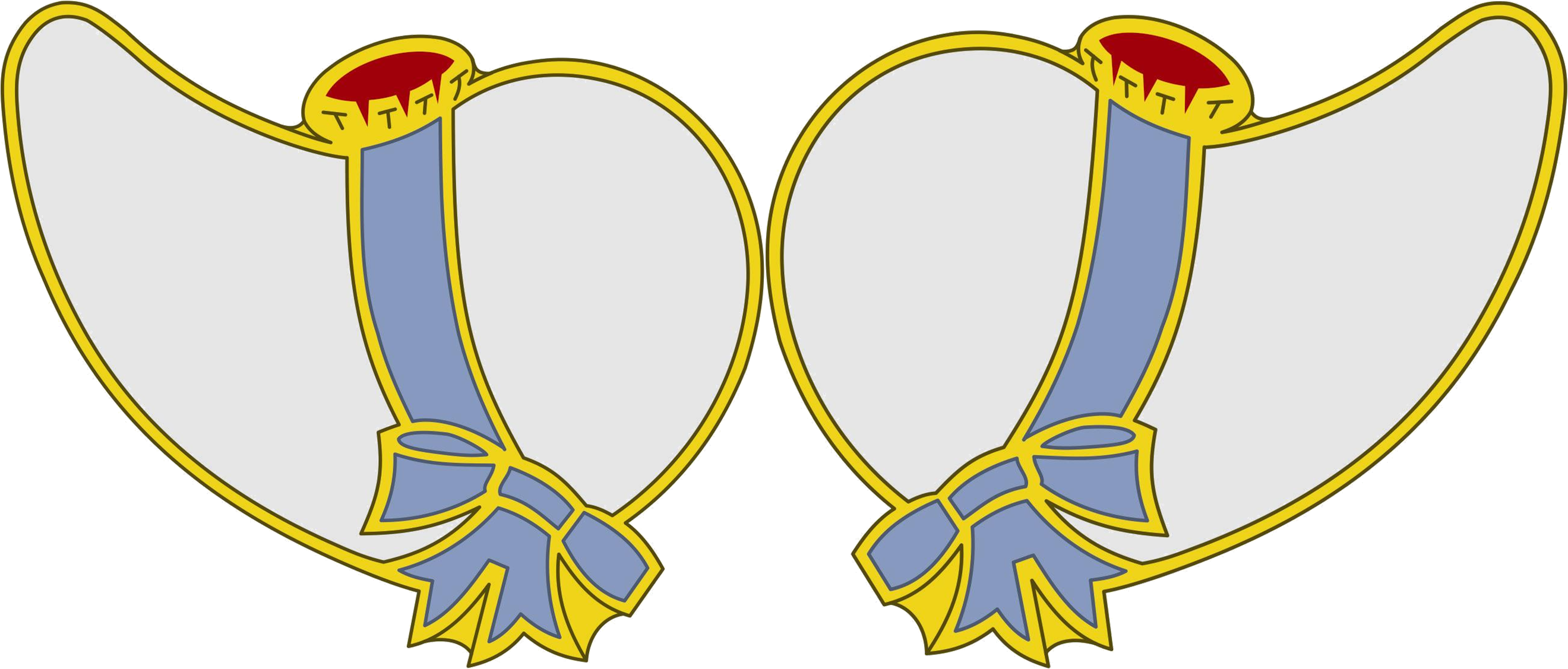
- 121st Infantry distinctive unit insignia

The 2nd Battalion, 121st Infantry Regiment is a light infantry battalion of the 48th Infantry Brigade Combat Team, Georgia Army National Guard. The Battalion is one of the oldest units in the U.S. Army, tracing its lineage to Georgia state militia units formed between 1810 and 1825. The Battalion provides the 48th Brigade with mounted and dismounted maneuver assets to destroy enemy formations in close combat. Prior to 2007, the unit was designated as a heavy mechanized formation and equipped with M2 Bradley Fighting Vehicles.

=== Pre-World War I ===
The earliest units associated with the 2nd Battalion, 121st Infantry were the Albany Guards and Barnesville Blues of the Georgia State Militia. These units, formed in 1810 along with the Baldwin Blues and Floyd Rifles, were the first organized infantry militia units in the state. In 1825, the Macon Volunteers also organized. Detachments of these infantry units served in the Seminole War and the Mexican War. During the American Civil War, the regiment was organized as the 4th Regiment Georgia Volunteers, 3rd Georgia Battalion, and finally the 37th Georgia Regiment. Units fought in most major battles of the war, including Malvern Hill, Sharpsburg, Spottsylvania, the Battle of Gettysburg, Second Manassas, Richmond, Seven Pines, Mechanicsville, Cold Harbor, the Wilderness Campaign, and Appomattox.

During the post-Reconstruction period several other regional units were added to the rolls, and by 1891 the regiment had organized into two battalions under the banner of the Second Georgia Infantry Regiment. In 1898, the Barnesville Blues fought as Company F, 2nd Battalion, 2nd Georgia Infantry Regiment during the Spanish–American War. During the Militia Act reorganization of the army in 1916, the 2nd Georgia became the 121st Infantry Regiment of the 31st "Dixie" Division.

=== World War I and Inter-war Years ===
With war looming in Europe, 2nd Battalion, 121st Infantry was federalized to patrol the border with Mexico. In 1916 and 1917, elements rotated between the southern border, Georgia and Florida. The prickly pear on the left of the Distinctive Unit Insignia alludes to this mission.

In September 1918, the entire regiment was ordered to duty in World War I. They arrived in France in October, and before the regiment disembarked, tragedy struck. Longtime commander COL J. A. Thomas, the man responsible for the regimental title "The Old Gray Bonnets", died aboard ship. The news didn't get any better for the tight knit unit once ashore as most of the unit was broken up into small replacement groups and immediately sent to the front. However, F Company of 2nd Battalion, along with B and C Companies of the 1st Battalion had travelled to Europe separately and were assigned intact to the 151st Machine Gun Battalion of the 42nd (Rainbow) Division. Elements of the regiment were to participate in six separate campaigns during their brief service in the war, garnering several individual citations of valor. This service is represented by the fleur-de-leis in the left side of the unit's DUI.

Upon return from France, the units were reorganized several times. In 1925, while at summer encampment at Tybee Island, GA, a hurricane struck. The National Guard camp was completely flooded and had to be rebuilt by men of the battalion. In 1934, labor unrest struck the textile mills of Georgia and 2nd Battalion was again called up, this time for state duty. Once state troops became involved in the labor troubles, they quickly died down with little violence.

In 1938, with war threatening Europe again, the massive Mississippi Maneuvers were conducted by the U.S. Army at Camp Shelby, MS. 2nd Battalion was one of the units involved. In 1940, as war seemed more inevitable, the Army developed an even larger exercise, the Louisiana maneuvers. Upon completion of that assignment, the entire regiment was federalized on 16 September 1940 at Ft. Jackson, SC and assigned to the 30th Division.

=== World War II ===
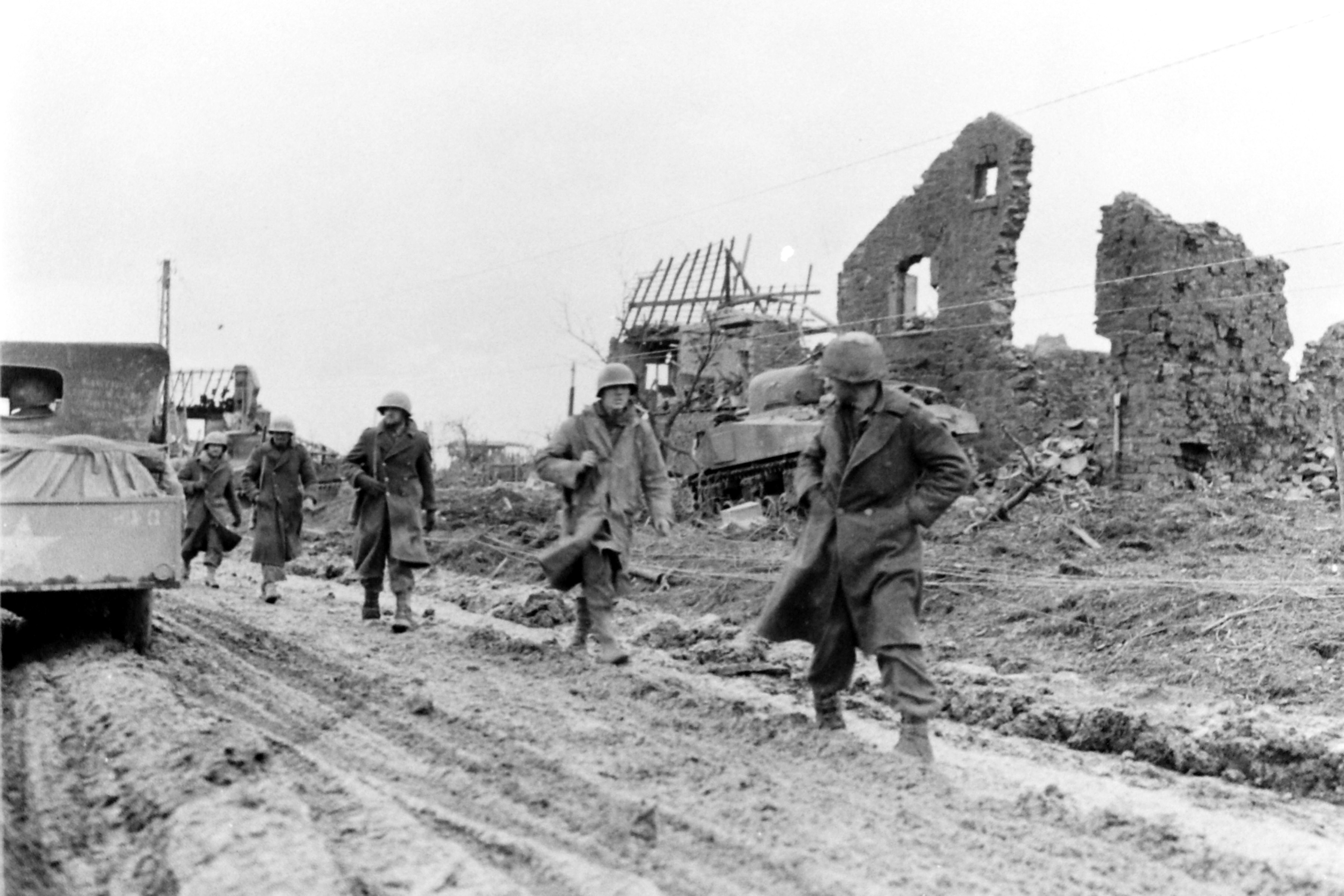
Soldiers from the 121st Infantry Regiment in Hurtgen, Germany during December 1944

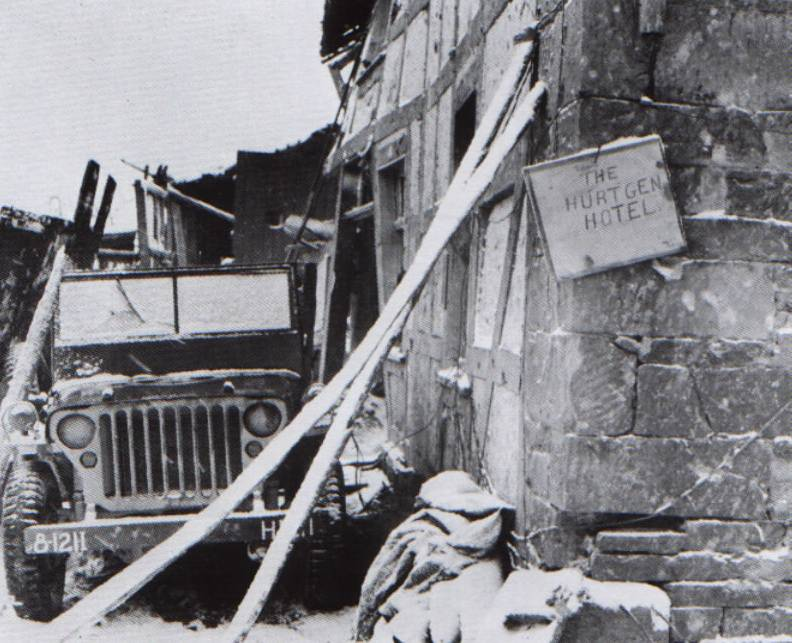
January 1945 A farmhouse on the main route through Hürtgen served as shelter (as indicated on Jeep Bumper) for H (Hq Company) 8 (8th Infantry Division, XIX Corps, 9th US Army) and 121 (121st Infantry Regiment). They nicknamed it the "Hürtgen Hotel"

The 2–121 Infantry saw extensive activity leading up to World War II and extensive action during the war. The regiment was assigned to the 8th Infantry Division and saw action in four campaigns in Northwestern Europe (1944–45). Among the many battles that the regiment participated in during its ten months of combat duty were the Battle for Brest and the Battle of Hürtgen Forest.

=== From 1990 ===
The Battalion was federalized for Desert Storm as part of the 48th Infantry Brigade on 30 November 1990. It arrived at Fort Stewart on or around 3 December 1990. After certifying at the National Training Center as combat-ready, the whole brigade was demobilised between 27 March and 10 April 1991.

The Battalion then deployed to Bosnia and Herzegovina for Stabilization Force (SFOR) Rotation 9 to provide support operations for Task Force Eagle (United States contingent to United Nations Operations in support of Dayton Peace Accord). The SFOR9 rotation was scheduled from April to October 2001.

=== Iraq War ===
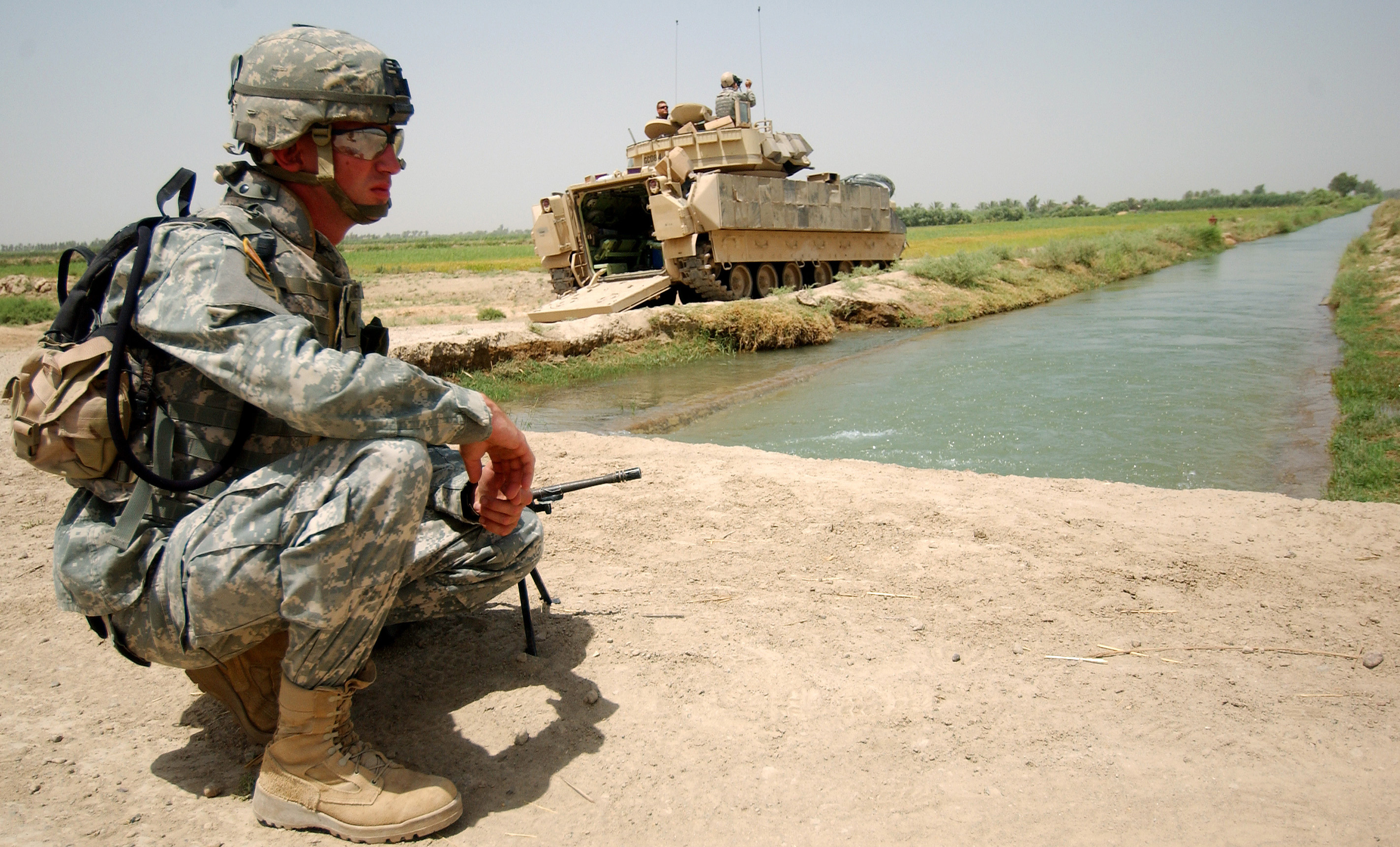
A soldier from the 2nd Battalion, 121st Infantry Regiment in Iraq during July 2005

The Battalion mobilized as a component of the 48th Brigade Combat Team in 2004 after the 2003 invasion of Iraq. In May 2005 the unit began deploying to Iraq as part of Operation Iraqi Freedom and experienced some of the fiercest combat actions in the campaign. During the first half of the brigade's deployment to Iraq (Spring 2005 through Spring 2006), the 2–121st spent much of its time of the region of Baghdad while the sister units 1–108 Armor was in the Southwest region (triangle of death). The unit's focus shifted during the second half of the deployment to a theater security mission primarily consisting of convoy escort and civilian military operations. 2–121 suffered eight fatalities while deployed to Iraq. On 20 April 2006, at Ft. Stewart, members of the 2–121st returned home after a year of combat operations in Iraq.

As a part of the United States Army's ongoing transformation to a lighter, more modular force the 2nd Battalion, 121st Infantry was re-designated as light infantry in 2007. The unit gave up its M2 Bradley Fighting Vehicles and became a dismounted force, with its anti-armor (Delta) company receiving up-armored HMMWVs.

In December 2007, the Georgia National Guard's 48th Infantry Brigade Combat Team was alerted that it would be deployed to Afghanistan in the summer of 2009 for Operation Enduring Freedom (OEF). In January 2009, the 2–121st began training for the expected year-long deployment. In the Spring of 2009, the unit returned to Camp Shelby, MS, the site of its World War II preparations nearly 70 years prior. The unit was subsequently deployed to Afghanistan in May.

While deployed in Afghanistan, the 2–121st participated in training the Afghan National Security Forces while conducting counter insurgency operations in the North, East, and Kabul Regional Command areas of operation. In April 2010 the unit redeployed from Afghanistan and demobilized at Fort Stewart, GA. The battalion suffered 2 fatalities while deployed to Afghanistan.

=== Current Organization ===
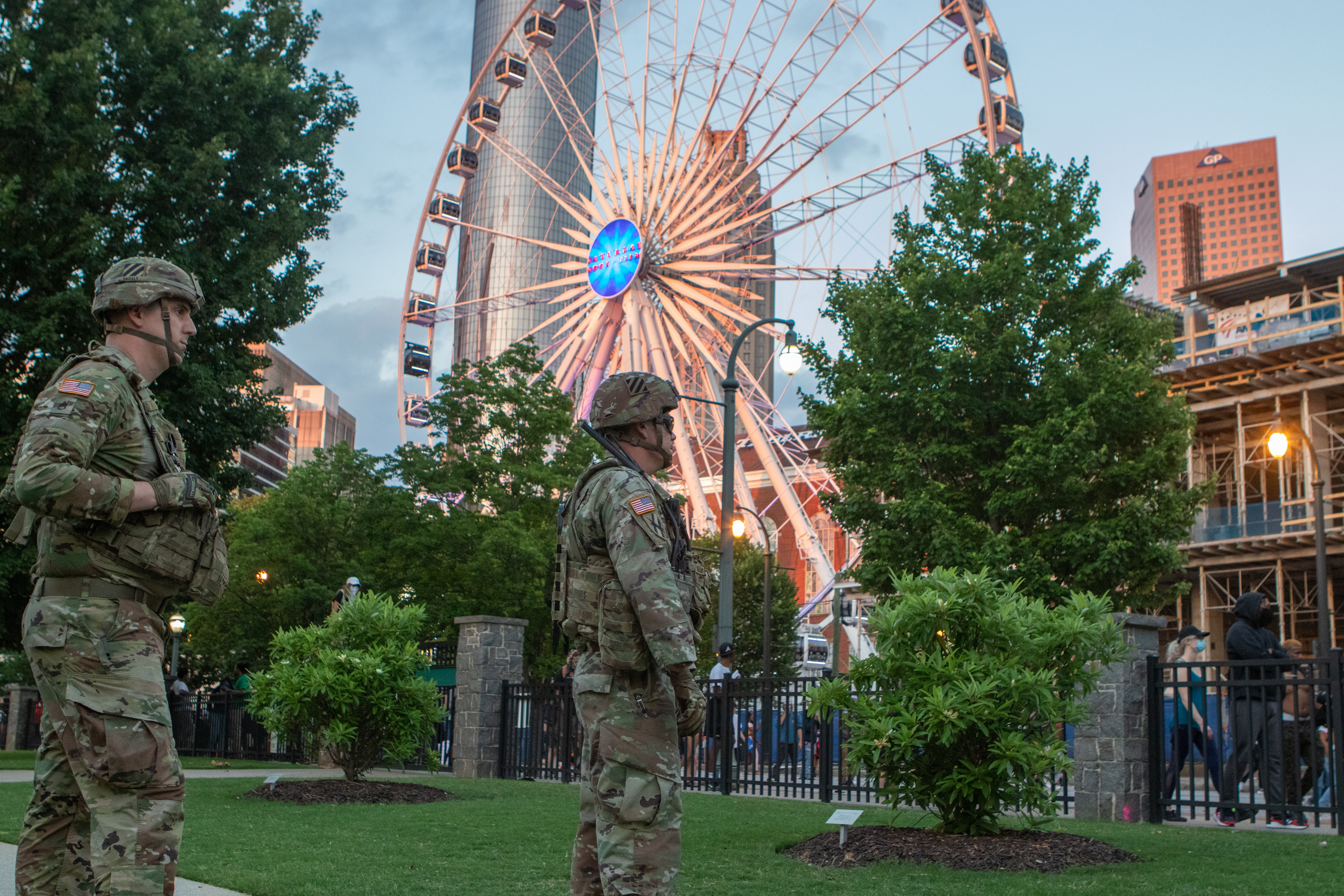
Members of the 3rd Battalion, 121st Infantry Regiment, monitor protesters in Atlanta during May 2020

Headquarters and Headquarters Company (Huron), located in Forsyth, GA
A Company (Apache), located in Griffin, GA
B Company (Blackhawk), located in Newnan, GA
C Company (Comanche), located in Cordele, GA and Americus, GA
D Company (Dakota), located in Valdosta, GA
H Company (High Roller), 148th Brigade Support Battalion Forward Support Company, located in Albany, GA (attached)

== Lineage and honors ==
=== Campaign streamers ===
Seminole Wars

Seminole (1835–1842)

Civil War

Peninsula (1862)
Fredericksburg (1863)
Gettysburg (1863)
Appomattox (1865)

World War I

Champagne-Marne (1918)
Aisne-Marne (1918)
St. Mihel (1918)
Meuse-Argonne (1918)
Lorraine (1918)
Champagne (1918)

World War II

Normandy (1944)
Northern France (1944)
Rhineland (1944–1945)
Central Europe (1945)

Global War on Terror

Iraq: (2005–2006)

Transition of Iraq
Iraqi Governance

Afghanistan: (2009–2010)

Consolidation II
Consolidation III

=== Unit decorations ===
French Croix de Guerre with Palm (France – 1944)
Presidential Unit Citation (Hurtgen Forest – 1945)
Meritorious Unit Citation (European Theater – 1945)
Luxembourg Croix de Guerre (Luxembourg – 1945)
Meritorious Unit Commendation (Afghanistan – 2010)
