= 169th Aviation Regiment =

- Country: USA
- Branch: United States Army Aviation Branch
- Type: Aviation

Aircraft flown
- Utility helicopter: UH-60L Black Hawk

The 169th Aviation Regiment is an aviation regiment of the U.S. Army.

== Structure ==
- 1st Battalion (General Support), 169th Aviation Regiment (CT ARNG), Enfield Armory, Enfield, Connecticut
  - Headquarters and Headquarters Company
    - Detachment 1 (AL ARNG), Birmingham Air National Guard Base, Birmingham, Alabama
    - Detachment 2 (GA ARNG), Army Aviation Support Facility #3, Hunter Army Airfield
  - Company A (USAR), Simmons Army Airfield, Fort Bragg, Fayetteville, North Carolina
  - Company B (AL ARNG), Birmingham Air National Guard Base, Birmingham, Alabama
    - Detachment 1 (GA ARNG), Army Aviation Support Facility #3, Hunter Army Airfield
    - Detachment 2 (GA ARNG), Army Aviation Support Facility #3, Hunter Army Airfield
  - Company C (MD ARNG), Edward J. Weide Army Heliport, Aberdeen Proving Ground Edgewood Area, Edgewood, Maryland
    - Detachment 1 (OK ARNG), Army Aviation Support Facility #1, Lexington, Oklahoma
    - Detachment 2 (GA ARNG), Army Aviation Support Facility #3, Hunter Army Airfield
  - Company D (CT ARNG), Windsor Locks, Connecticut
    - Detachment 2 (GA ARNG), Army Aviation Support Facility #3, Hunter Army Airfield
    - Detachment 4 (PA ARNG), Johnstown Military Aviation Complex, Johnstown, Pennsylvania
    - Detachment 8 (AL ARNG), Birmingham Air National Guard Base, Birmingham, Alabama
    - Detachment 9 (GA ARNG), Army Aviation Support Facility #3, Hunter Army Airfield
  - Company E (CT ARNG), Windsor Locks, Connecticut
    - Detachment 2 (GA ARNG), Army Aviation Support Facility #3, Hunter Army Airfield
    - Detachment 4 (PA ARNG), Johnstown Military Aviation Complex, Johnstown, Pennsylvania
    - Detachment 8 (AL ARNG), Birmingham Air National Guard Base, Birmingham, Alabama
  - Company F (NY ARNG), Aviation Support Facility #2, Rochester Armory, Rochester, New York
    - Detachment 1 (LA ARNG), Aviation Support Facility #1, Air Traffic Services, Northshore Regional Airport, Hammond, Louisiana
    - Detachment 3 (MO ARNG), Springfield Aviation Classification Repair Activity Depot, Springfield, Missouri
