= St. Cloud Regional Airport =

- IATA: STC; ICAO: KSTC; FAA LID: STC

Summary
- Airport type: Public
- Owner: City of St. Cloud
- Serves: St. Cloud, Minnesota
- Elevation AMSL: 1,031 ft (314 m)
- Coordinates: 45°32′48″N 094°03′36″W
- Website: www.StCloudAirport.com

Map
- Location of airport in Minnesota STC (the United States)

Runways
Direction	Length		Surface
Direction	ft	m	Surface
13/31	7,500	2,286	Concrete
5/23	3,000	914	Asphalt

Statistics
- Aircraft operations (2018): 30,045
- Based aircraft (2020): 109
- Source: Federal Aviation Administration

St. Cloud Sky Central Airport (IATA: STC, ICAO: KSTC, FAA LID: STC) is a public-use airport in Sherburne County, Minnesota, United States, and owned by the St. Cloud Regional Airport Authority. It is located four nautical miles (5 mi, 7 km) east of the central business district of the City of St.Cloud The airport serves private, commercial, corporate, cargo and military operations. Mostly used for general aviation, it is also served by commercial airlines.

This airport is included in the National Plan of Integrated Airport Systems for 2017–2021, which categorized it as a primary commercial service airport. As per Federal Aviation Administration records, the airport had 20,161 passenger boardings (enplanements) in calendar year 2008, 14,294 enplanements in 2009, and 1,198 in 2010. Mesaba Airlines, operating flights for Delta Connection, ended service to Minneapolis/St. Paul on December 31, 2009. Allegiant Air began service to Phoenix/Mesa Gateway Airport, AZ on December 15, 2012, also serviced Orlando/Sanford, FL from 2013-2014 and Destin/Fort Walton Beach, FL in 2021, and seasonally services Fort Myers/Punta Gorda Airport, FL since 2017. SkyWest Airlines, operating as United Express, operated flights from St. Cloud to Chicago O'Hare International Airport from May 2014 to April 2015. The flights were suspended due to "poor performance in the market."

== Facilities and aircraft ==
St. Cloud Regional Airport covers an area of 1,414 acres (572 ha) at an elevation of 1,031 feet (314 m) above mean sea level. It has two runways: 13/31 is 7,500 by 150 feet (2,286 x 46 m) with a concrete surface and 5/23 is 3,000 by 75 feet (914 x 23 m) with an asphalt surface.

For the 12-month period ending September 30, 2015, the airport had 28,740 aircraft operations, an average of 79 per day: 84% general aviation, 13% military, 1% air taxi and 2% scheduled commercial. In January 2017, there were 92 aircraft based at this airport: 63 single-engine, 12 military, 13 jet, 3 multi-engine and 1 helicopter.

== Airlines and destinations ==
Airlines	Destinations	Refs
Allegiant Air	Phoenix/Mesa; Seasonal: Punta Gorda (FL)	

== Statistics ==
Busiest routes from STC (February 2025 – January 2026)
Rank	Airport	Passengers	Carriers
1	Phoenix/Mesa, AZ	18,630	Allegiant
2	Punta Gorda, FL	6,770	Allegiant

== History ==
In 2020 the airport received a $1,092,430 CARES Act award. In 2026, the airport rebranded from "St. Cloud Regional Airport" to "St. Cloud Sky Central Airport."

== See also ==
- List of airports in Minnesota
- St. Cloud Metropolitan Transit Commission
- St. Cloud station
