= Troop E, 256th Cavalry =

- Active: 1967–1995
- Country: United States
- Branch: United States Army
- Type: Reconnaissance
- Part of: 256th Infantry Brigade
- Garrison/HQ: Hammond (1967–1971); Leesville (1971–1977); Natchitoches (1977–1995)

Troop E, 256th Cavalry was the armored cavalry reconnaissance troop of the 256th Infantry Brigade of the Louisiana Army National Guard from 1967 to 1995. It was the only unit assigned to the 256th Cavalry parent regiment under the Combat Arms Regimental System, which carried over to the replacement United States Army Regimental System.

The original Troop E was redesignated from a previous armored cavalry unit at Hammond, but a 1971 reorganization resulted in a new Troop E being redesignated from an engineer unit at Leesville while the Hammond unit became engineers. Six years later, another reorganization switched the roles and designations of the Leesville unit and a Natchitoches infantry unit. The troop was called up for the Gulf War in 1990 but did not deploy. The Natchitoches unit was redesignated as Troop A, 108th Cavalry, in 1995.

== History ==
The parent regiment of Troop E was constituted on 6 November 1967 as the 256th Cavalry under the Combat Arms Regimental System (CARS) in the Louisiana Army National Guard. Troop E was organized from Troop C of the 1st Squadron, 139th Cavalry on 1 December 1967 at Hammond, serving as the armored cavalry troop of the 256th Infantry Brigade. The Hammond unit had been constituted on 17 June 1946 in the Louisiana National Guard as Battery C of the 105th Antiaircraft Artillery Automatic Weapons Battalion and organized and Federally recognized on 29 July 1948 at Hammond. On 1 October 1953, the battalion dropped the "Automatic Weapons" designation. On 1 July 1959, the battery was redesignated as Troop C of the 1st Reconnaissance Squadron of the 139th Armor. It became Troop C of the 139th Cavalry's 1st Squadron on 1 May 1963.

The Louisiana Army National Guard was reorganized on 1 January 1971, and the Hammond unit became Company A of the 205th Engineer Battalion, while the 2228th Engineer Company at Leesville was redesignated as the new Troop E. The transfer to Leesville was made in order that the unit would be closer to tank training and gunnery ranges at Fort Polk. The 2228th was originally constituted on 3 December 1941 as Company A of the 773rd Tank Destroyer Battalion, and activated on 15 December at Camp Shelby. The 773rd arrived at Gourock, Scotland, on 7 February 1944. After landing in Normandy with M10 tank destroyers on 8 August, it fought in the European Theater of Operations and ended the war in Czechoslovakia in May 1945. The company was inactivated at Camp Patrick Henry after returning to the United States on 23 October. It was redesignated as Company A of the 773rd Tank Battalion and allotted to the Louisiana National Guard on 17 June 1946. The battalion became a Heavy Tank Battalion on 17 October 1949, while Company A was based at Leesville. On 5 October 1950, during the Korean War, the company was ordered into active Federal service at Leesville. On 17 November, the battalion became a Medium Tank battalion, and on 19 February 1951 reverted to the 773rd Tank Battalion designation. The company was released from active Federal service and reverted to State control on 1 November 1954. On 1 July 1959, the company was redesignated as the 1087th Transportation Company. It became the 2228th Engineer Company on 1 May 1963. By 1976, Troop E was equipped with the M60A1 main battle tank.

On 1 March 1977, the Louisiana Army National Guard was again reorganized and the Leesville unit became Company A of the 156th Infantry's 3rd Battalion, switching role and designation with the previous Company A at Natchitoches. Company A of the 156th Infantry had been originally organized and Federally recognized on 14 June 1921 at Natchitoches as the 1st Separate Company, Louisiana Infantry. On 3 November it was redesignated Company C of the 156th Infantry, and on 3 July 1922 it became the headquarters company of the 156th's 3rd Battalion. On 1 May 1929, the company was redesignated as headquarters company of the 2nd Battalion. It was redesignated as Battery H of the 204th Coast Artillery on 15 December 1939 and inducted into Federal service on 6 January 1941. On 10 September 1943, it was redesignated as Battery D of the 527th Antiaircraft Artillery Automatic Weapons Battalion, and inactivated on 1 December 1944 at Camp Livingston. On 17 June 1946, it was redesignated as Headquarters and Headquarters Company of the 2nd Battalion, 199th Infantry, and reorganized and Federally recognized on 13 November. It was redesignated as Company C of the 156th Infantry's 3rd Battle Group on 1 July 1959 and as the 1090th Transportation Company on 1 May 1963. On 1 January 1971, the company became Company A of the 156th's 3rd Battalion.

On 1 June 1989, the parent regiment was withdrawn from CARS and reorganized under the replacement United States Army Regimental System with headquarters at Natchitoches. By 1990 Troop E was equipped with the M113 armored personnel carrier and had an authorized strength of 161 men. Troop E was ordered into active Federal service along with the rest of the 256th Brigade on 3 December 1990 for the Gulf War and sent to Fort Polk, where it conducted training in preparation for deployment. The troop remained behind at Fort Polk when the majority of the brigade left for Fort Hood to continue its training because it was assigned to a regular unit of the 5th Infantry Division. However, the war ended before the troop could finish training, and it was released from active Federal service on 20 April 1991. On 2 September 1995, the troop was redesignated as Troop A, 108th Cavalry Regiment, reviving the number of an interwar Louisiana horse cavalry unit. The 256th Cavalry parent regiment was not authorized a coat of arms or distinctive unit insignia.
