= LSG =

LSG can refer to:

== Organizations ==
- LSG Group, an aviation services company
- League of Saint George, a far right group
- Ligo de Seksemdiversaj Geesperantistoj, LGBTQ Esperantist organization
- Louisiana State Guard, the state defense force of Louisiana
- Lucknow Super Giants, an Indian cricket franchise

=== Music ===
- LSG (band), an R&B group
- L.S.G., a techno-trance project by Oliver Lieb

== Science ==
- Laparoscopic sleeve gastrectomy, a surgical weight-loss procedure
- Virgo Supercluster, the Local Supercluster of galaxies

== Other ==
- Loss of strength gradient, used in the context of military might; a theory that strength declines as distance increases
- Landing Ship Gantry, a US Navy World War II type ship
