= 2015 Eglin Air Force Base helicopter crash =

Aviation incident in Florida, United States

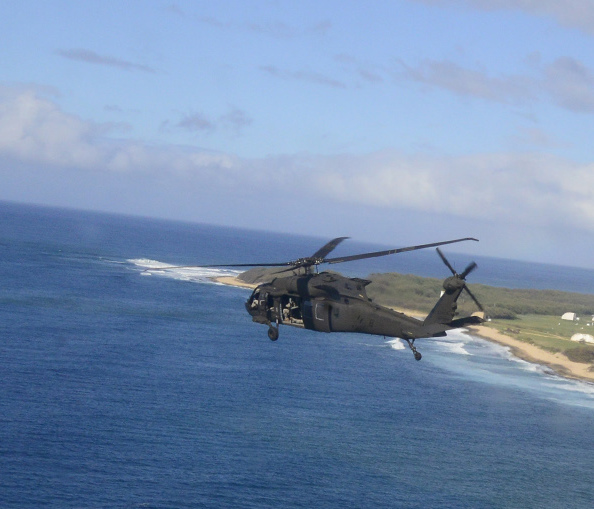
- A UH-60M Black Hawk similar to the one involved

Accident
- Date: March 10, 2015, 2021:38 Central Standard Time (UTC-7:00)
- Summary: Loss of control due to spatial disorientation resulting from entry into IMC
- Site: Off the coast of the Florida panhandle, United States; 30.4013°N 86.8013°W

Aircraft
- Aircraft type: Sikorsky UH-60M Black Hawk
- Operator: United States Army
- Registration: 13-20624
- Occupants: 11
- Passengers: 7
- Crew: 4
- Fatalities: 11
- Survivors: 0

On March 10, 2015, a Sikorsky UH-60 Black Hawk helicopter of the United States Army crashed off the coast of the Florida panhandle during a training exercise at Eglin Air Force Base, killing all eleven people on board. The helicopter was reported missing during foggy conditions at 8:30 PM. The helicopter was assigned to the 1-244th Assault Helicopter Battalion, based in Hammond, Louisiana.

== Flight ==
The UH-60M helicopter was on a night training flight on March 10, 2015, when it disappeared. The Marines on board the helicopter were supposed to be dropped off by the helicopter and make their way ashore to simulate an over-the-beach landing. They had conducted a similar exercise earlier in the day. The helicopter flew into dense coastal fog that night and disappeared, approximately five minutes after takeoff.

=== Passengers and crew ===
There were eleven people on board the helicopter at the time, of whom seven were U.S. Marines assigned to a special operations unit and four were U.S. Army soldiers and members of the Louisiana National Guard. The Black Hawk helicopter was piloted by Chief Warrant Officer 4 (CW4) George Wayne Griffin Jr., 37, and CW4 George David Strother, 44; both were members of the 1st Battalion (Assault) of the 244th Aviation Regiment, a unit of the Louisiana Army National Guard (LAARNG).

The Marines on the helicopter were assigned to Marine Corps Special Operations Command (MARSOC) Raiders Team 8231, based at Marine Corps Base Camp Lejeune in North Carolina.

=== Helicopter ===
The helicopter, assigned tail number 13-20624, was new. Sikorsky installed the engines in August 2014, completed flight tests on the aircraft that December, and maintenance personnel ferried it from NAES Lakehurst in Lakehurst, New Jersey to Hammond in January 2015. At the time of the accident, it had approximately 60 hours of flight time.

=== Events ===
At approximately 1945 CST, CW4 Griffin was briefed on weather conditions prior to launch; the UH-60M piloted by CW4 Griffin and CW4 Strother (operating under callsign MOJO 69) took off with another LAARNG UH-60M at 2016 CST to perform the training exercise. CW4 Strother was recorded saying "Gee, it's dark as (expletive). That don't help none," shortly after takeoff. Once MOJO 69 crossed the shoreline, they entered what the investigation later called a Degraded Visual Environment at approximately 173 seconds after takeoff; the other UH-60M did not follow MOJO 69 into the fog, choosing instead to turn east and hover. Four seconds after one of the aircrew noted they were over the water, CW4 Griffin noted "Yeah, it's too dark to see the (expletive) water."

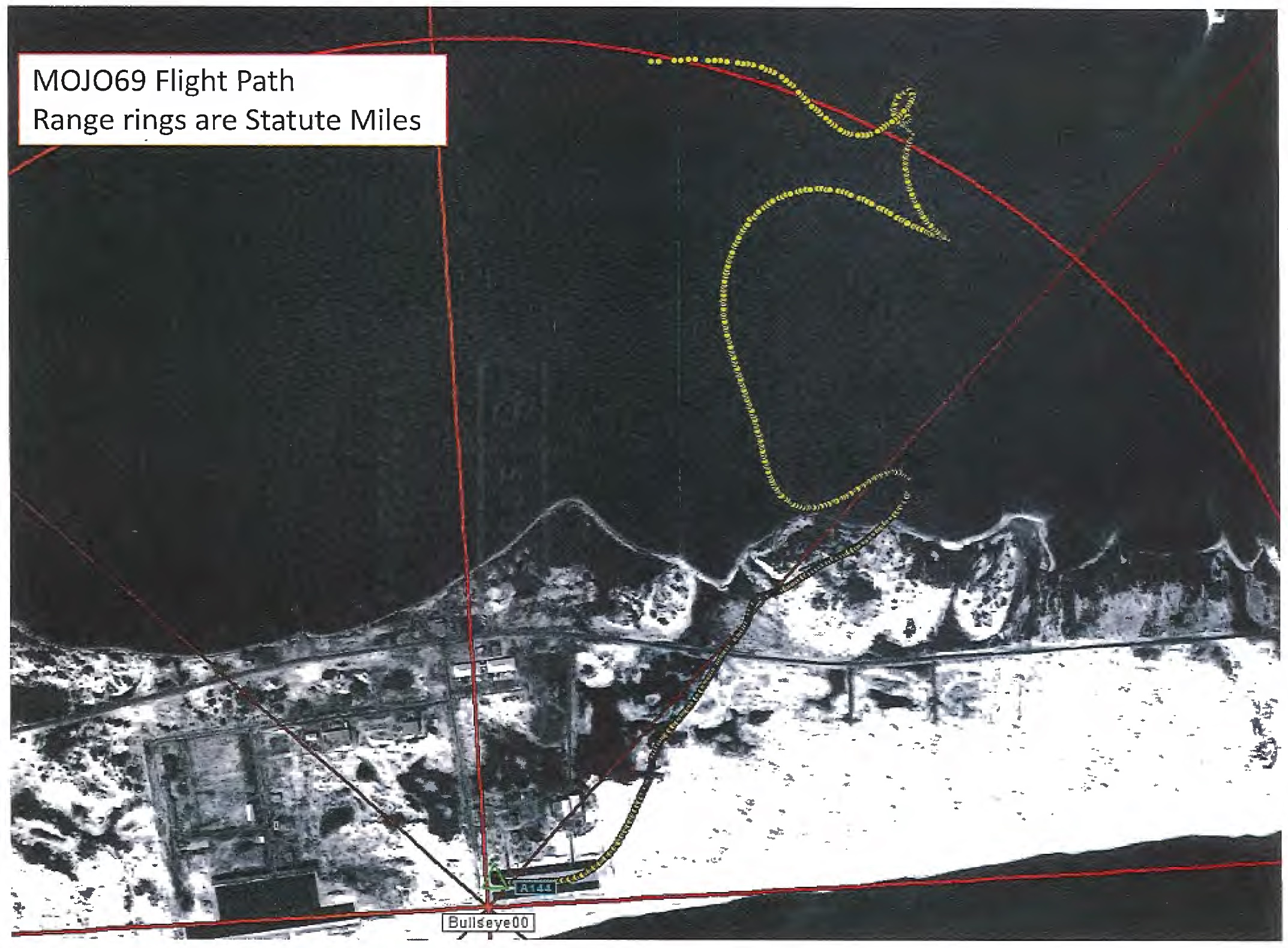
Illustration showing MOJO 69 flight path, 10 Mar 2015

After entering the fogbank, both pilots of MOJO 69 started exhibiting signs of spatial disorientation, according to both the flight data recorder and cockpit voice transmission transcripts; MOJO 69 came to zero knots indicated airspeed and began flying backwards almost immediately after losing visual references. This deviated from the mission path, and CW4 Griffin, the pilot-in-command, failed to announce the deviation, providing evidence that he had become disoriented without realizing it. MOJO 69 turned on their position light and asked the other helicopter's flight crew to put on their position light as well; the other helicopter's crew radioed back that they could not see MOJO 69. During this time, MOJO 69 flew backwards for approximately 20 seconds before CW4 Griffin announced he was "coming back to the right ... pulling back to the East", not realizing he had instead turned to the north. As MOJO 69 continued backwards, it turned right about the yaw axis and took a nose-up pitch attitude of 20 degrees.

Approximately 56 seconds after the first signs of spatial disorientation, CW4 Strother announced "we climbed up in it" and asked "where's our airspeed?" Both pilots showed "increasingly erratic flight control inputs" and had "anxious verbal exchanges" at this point: CW4 Griffin commanded rapid climb and descent maneuvers and put the aircraft into a spin. CW4 Strother asked "G-Wayne, what are you doin'?" and asked him to climb; CW4 Griffin responded that he was "climbin' up" after approximately twenty seconds and CW4 Strother warned him about the spin five seconds after that.

Approximately 96 seconds after first showing spatial disorientation, CW4 Griffin asked CW4 Strother to take the controls, but both pilots were unable to regain control of the aircraft. CW4 Griffin warned CW4 Strother to "watch the collective" twice and took the controls back 8 seconds after relinquishing them to CW4 Strother. CW4 Strother suggested engaging the autopilot, but this was not successful as the aircraft was already "outside the required flight parameters", and CW4 Strother first warned CW4 Griffin they were "in a bad right turn", then to "watch your altitude, attitude G-Wayne attitude, level" in quick succession.

The last recorded cockpit voice transmission was CW4 Strother urging "climb, climb". MOJO 69 crashed into Santa Rosa Sound, approximately 125 seconds after entering the fog. Both the speed and angle of impact were not survivable.

=== Search ===
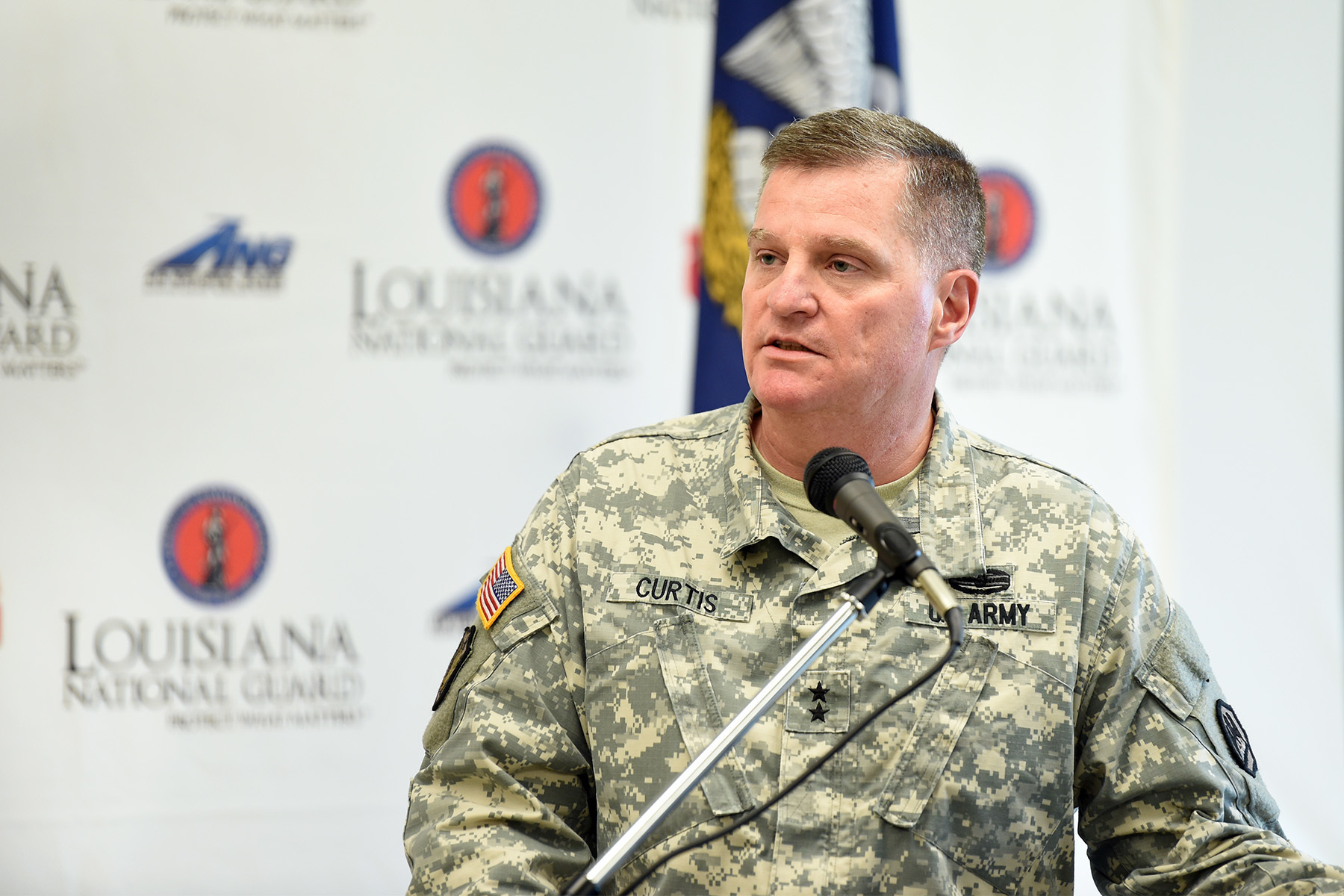
Adjutant general of the Louisiana National Guard, Maj Gen Glenn Curtis briefs the media about the accident on March 11, 2015 (photo by MSgt Toby Valadie)

Debris from the crash was found on March 11 at 2 AM around Okaloosa Island. The search for the passengers, which focused on waters east of Navarre, Florida, was hindered by heavy fog in the area. On the morning of March 11, a spokesman for the Eglin Air Force Base said that human remains had been found in the area of the search. The wreckage was later found in 25 feet (7.6 m) of water off the coast of Navarre.

By March 12, the bodies of two soldiers on board the helicopter had been recovered, and by March 17, all 11 bodies from the crash had been recovered and identified.

== Investigation ==
A later investigation conducted by LAARNG and SOCOM concluded that the cause of the crash was spatial disorientation, resulting in the pilots crashing into the Santa Rosa Sound. Contributing causes included the pilots' choice to fly in weather and visibility that did not meet minimum requirements and a breakdown in aircrew communication, both before and during the mission.

CW4 Griffin had been briefed on March 7 that operations with night vision goggles could be conducted under visual meteorological conditions (VMC) only, establishing minimum requirements for the cloud ceiling [1,000 feet (300 m)] and visibility [3 miles (5 km)]; these requirements were subsequently included and acknowledged on all mission briefing sheets. Contrary to these VMC minima requirements, both helicopters took off in conditions with low clouds and poor visibility; Hurlburt Field, which was the closest weather facility to the accident site, was showing visibility of 1 mile (1.6 km) and a cloud ceiling of 300 feet (91 m) at 1958 and 2058 CST that night. In addition, prior to takeoff, an observer at the drop zone called Hurlburt Field to receive a weather report at 1926 CST, concerned that he could not see the lights of the 300 feet (91 m) tall control tower, which was approximately 2.3 miles (3.7 km) from his position. The observer voiced his concerns about the visibility by telephone to Master Sergeant (MSgt) Thomas Saunders, one of the Marines assigned to fly on MOJO 69 that night. CW4 Griffin stated he was unconcerned, as his flight path would keep him away from the tower and that he had the required ceilings to fly the mission.

CW4 Strother and the rest of the MOJO 69 aircrew did not challenge CW4 Griffin's decision to proceed with the mission in the face of deteriorating weather, because of their confidence in CW4 Griffin's judgment and piloting skill. This occurred despite individuals exhibiting trepidation about "the weather and the lack of ambient illumination". In addition, once CW4 Griffin began exhibiting spatial disorientation, the transfer of controls and assistance with interpreting flight instruments "were not adequately executed" and the two pilots were unable to assist each other to flight under instrument meteorological conditions effectively.

== Memorials ==
A year after the crash, friends and families of the crash victims participated in the Marine Raider Memorial March, carrying heavy rucksacks over a 770-mile-long (1,240 km) course from Florida to North Carolina. Seven teams of two or three people participated; each team marched over a 11-mile (18 km) segment before being relieved by another team for the next segment, with the march scheduled to complete on March 21. The marchers bore a paddle recovered from the wreck and upon arriving at Camp Lejune, presented it to the commanding officer of the 2nd Marine Raider Battalion. A documentary film covering the march was released in October.

A memorial sculpture was unveiled in Navarre Park in November 2016, with the names of the 11 servicemen engraved. The memorial, which was designed by local artist Randy New and built by Corey Swindle in Alabama, was organized by a group of 35 community leaders. The memorial is the destination of the annual Rucking for Raiders march from Auburn University; the 210-mile (340 km) march started in 2017 to honor Raider Team 8231.
