= 244th Regiment =

244th Regiment may refer to:

- 244th Air Defense Artillery Regiment, United States
- 244th Aviation Regiment, United States
- 244th Infantry Regiment "Cosenza", Italy
