= Louisiana Wing Civil Air Patrol =

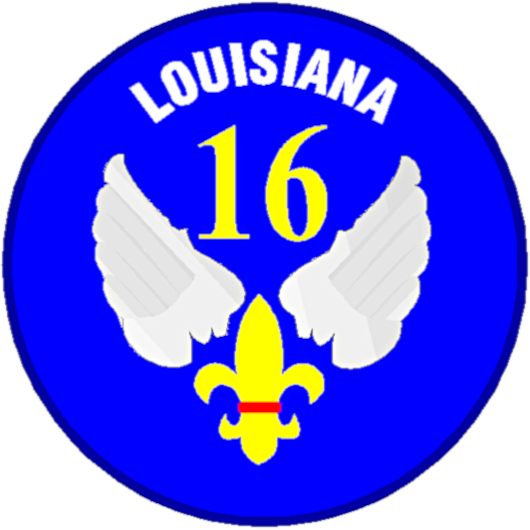
- Louisiana Wing of Civil Air Patrol

Associated branches
- United States Air Force

Command staff
- Commander: Col Todd Scioneaux
- Deputy Commander: Lt Col Tracy Breithaupt
- Chief of Staff: Lt Col Chris Sturm

Current statistics
- Cadets: 480
- Seniors: 419
- Total Membership: 899
- Awards: 2011 National Commander’s Unit Citation Award
- Website: lawg.cap.gov
- Statistics as of 2026

The Louisiana Wing of Civil Air Patrol (CAP) (French: Patrouille Aérienne Civile de l'Escadre de Louisiane; Spanish: Ala de Luisiana Patrulla Aérea Civil) is the highest echelon of Civil Air Patrol in the state of Louisiana. Louisiana Wing headquarters are located in Baton Rouge, Louisiana. The Louisiana Wing consists of over 900 cadet and adult members at 19 locations across the state of Louisiana.

== Mission ==
The Louisiana Wing performs the three primary missions of Civil Air Patrol: providing emergency services; providing a cadet program for youth; and offering aerospace education for both CAP members and the general public.

=== Emergency services ===
Civil Air Patrol has an emergency services mission, which includes performing search and rescue and disaster relief missions; as well as providing assistance in administering humanitarian aid. The CAP provides Air Force support by conducting light transport, communications support, and low-altitude route surveys; they can also offer support to counter-drug missions.

In 2005, the Louisiana Wing participated in recovery efforts following Hurricane Katrina. At least 94 senior members from the Louisiana Wing volunteered a total of 604 man-days, and five cadets participated for 28 days. Louisiana mission pilots, observers and scanners took part in 433 aerial search and rescue and aerial photography missions, totaling 1,025 hours in the air.

CAP cadets at encampment at Barksdale Air Force Base.

=== Cadet programs ===
Civil Air Patrol offers cadet programs for youth aged 12 to 21. Cadets are trained in aerospace education, leadership training, physical fitness and moral leadership.

The Louisiana Wing runs an encampment in the summer.

=== Aerospace education ===
Civil Air Patrol offers aerospace education for cadet and senior Civil Air Patrol members, and the general public; this includes offering training to the members of the CAP, and teaching students through workshops taught at schools and public aviation events.

== Organization ==
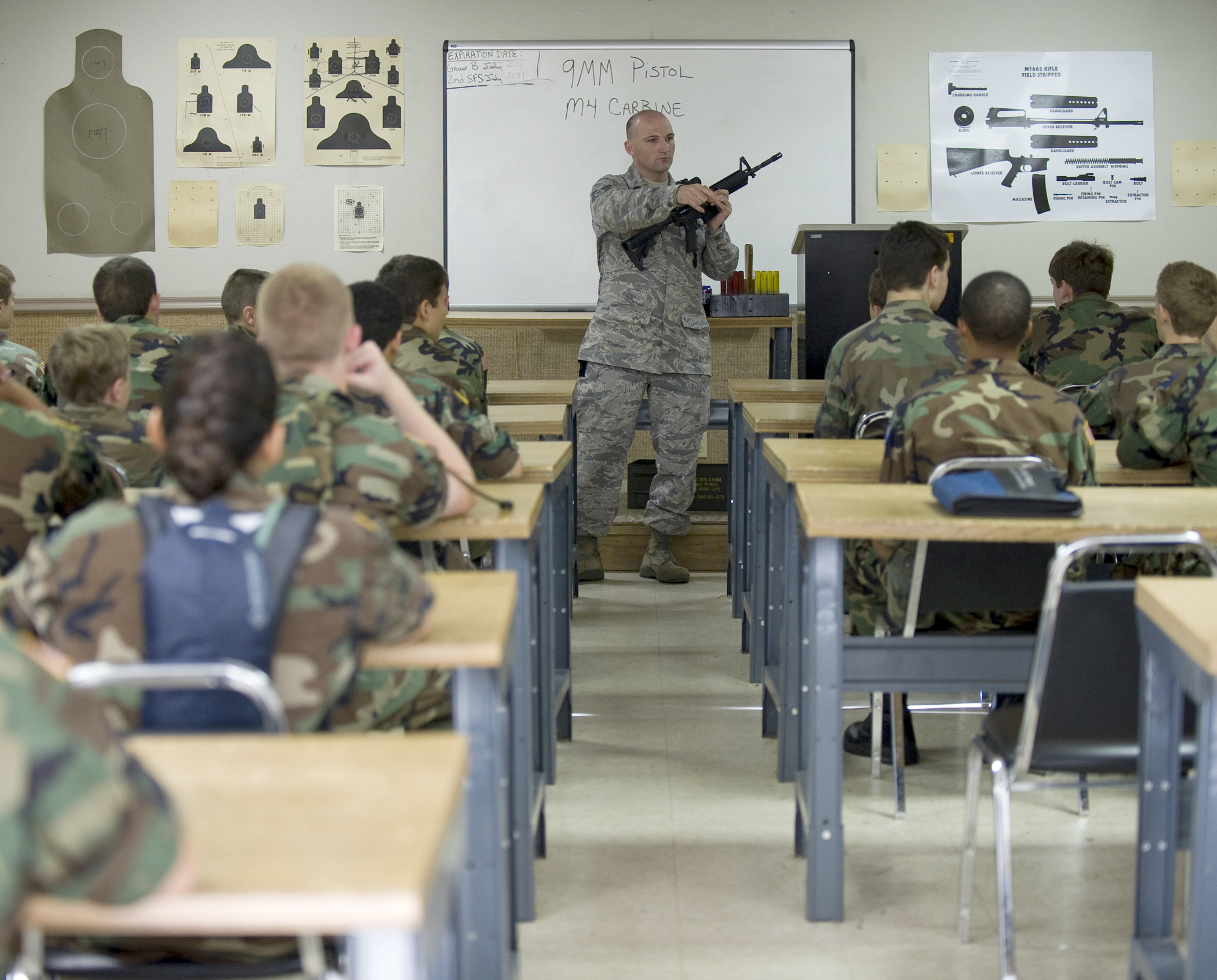
Tech. Sgt. Lee Thompson briefs several Louisiana Wing Civil Air Patrol cadets on the capabilities of the M4 carbine rifle during a weapons demonstration.

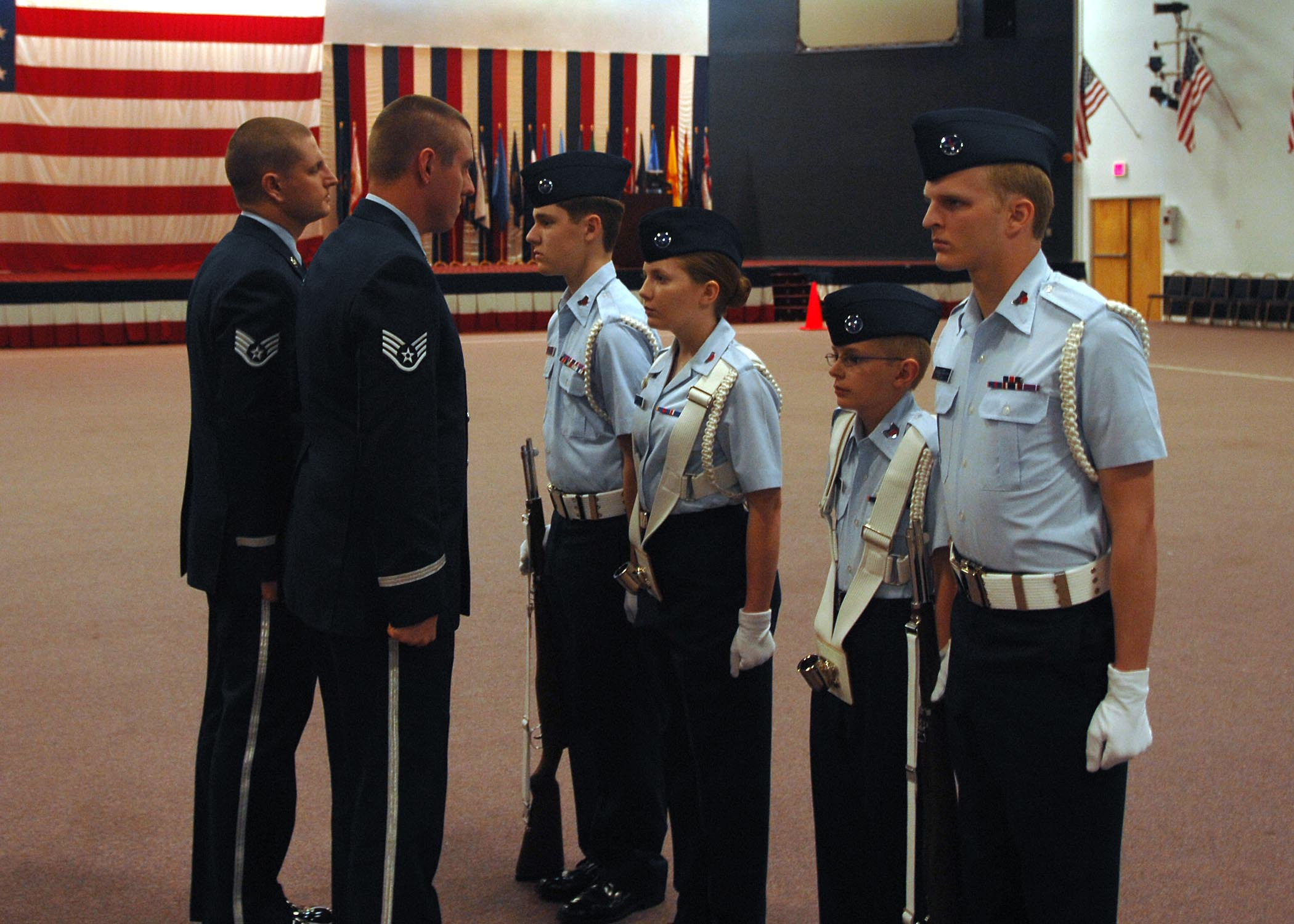
Civil Air Patrol Louisiana Wing Color Guard team is inspected by members of the Barksdale Honor Guard.

Squadrons of the Louisiana Wing
Designation	Squadron Name	Location	Notes
SWR-LA-005	Barksdale Composite Squadron	Barksdale Air Force Base	
SWR-LA-007	Lake Charles Composite Squadron	Lake Charles	
SWR-LA-008	Hammond Composite Squadron	Hammond	
SWR-LA-009	Tangipahoa Composite Squadron	Kentwood	
SWR-LA-010	Capitol City Composite Squadron	Baton Rouge	
SWR-LA-013	Shreveport Senior Squadron	Shreveport	
SWR-LA-014	Lafayette Composite Squadron	Lafayette	
SWR-LA-019	General Claire L. Chennault Composite Squadron	Monroe	
SWR-LA-022	Ascension Parish Composite Squadron	Gonzales	
SWR-LA-067	Central Louisiana Composite Squadron	Alexandria	
SWR-LA-076	Billy Mitchell Senior Squadron	New Orleans	
SWR-LA-086	Alvin Callendar Composite Squadron	New Orleans Lakefront Airport	
SWR-LA-088	St. Tammany Composite Squadron	Covington	
SWR-LA-089	St. Mary Parish Composite Squadron	Patterson	
SWR-LA-093	Pontchartrain Composite Squadron	Harahan	
SWR-LA-094	Lincoln Cadet Squadron	Ruston	
SWR-LA-095	Leesville Composite Squadron	Leesville	
SWR-LA-098	Slidell Composite Squadron	Slidell	
SWR-LA-966	Green Flag East Flight	Alexandria	
SWR-LA-999	Louisiana State Legislative Squadron	Baton Rouge	

== Legal protection ==
Members of Civil Air Patrol who are employed within the borders of Louisiana are entitled to a leave of absence from their place of employment, up to fifteen days per calendar year, to take part in Civil Air Patrol missions or training, without loss of pay, time, annual leave, or efficiency rating.

== See also ==
- Louisiana Air National Guard
- Louisiana Army National Guard
- Louisiana State Guard
- United States Coast Guard Auxiliary
