= Brothers In Arms Foundation =

- Formation: 2009
- Type: Nonprofit 501(C)(3) Corporation
- Purpose: Veterans services
- Headquarters: Boynton Beach, Florida
- Founder: Phillip Noblin
- Key people: Patrick J. Miller (Co-Founder); Steve Reichert (Chairman); Sherie Noblin (Director); Allan Smith (Board Member); Christina Infelise (Board Member)
- Website: Official website

Brothers In Arms Foundation (BIAF) is a charity and veterans service organization in the United States that offers a variety of programs, services, and events for wounded veterans. It operates as a nonprofit 501(c)(3) organization.

Founded in 2009 by Phillip Noblin to assist four wounded Marine Corps Forces Special Operations Command veterans, Brothers In Arms has gone on to assist Marines, Naval veterans, and the families of veterans in need.

== History ==
Brothers In Arms Foundation was founded in 2009 in Boynton Beach, Florida, by Phillip Noblin. Noblin formed the non-profit in response to the injury of Master Sgt. Eden Pearl in Afghanistan After Pearl became the "most wounded man ever to survive" in the history of the United States Military", Noblin arranged to raise funds for "A Home for Eden", the fundraiser to build a home for Pearl and his family that met his needs. In 2013, working alongside the Gary Sinese Foundation, BIAF built the home for Pearl and his family in San Antonio.

== Donations and Fundraising ==
BIAF has held various annual events for charity. The Charity Golf Classic is held annually in Melbourne, Florida, in honor of Gunnery Sgt. Jonathan Gifford. BIAF also worked with Dog Tag Brewing and Pabst Brewing Company in 2016, creating a line of Legacy Lager bearing Gifford's name, raising funds to further provide assistance to wounded, fallen, ill, and injured veterans and their families. Noblin and the BIAF assisted Robert Cohen, Sean Smith, and Mark deWolf with the annual Cpl. Jonathan G. Cohen Memorial Golf Tournament, raising funds for the Jon Cohen Memorial Fund to provide students with the Jonathan Cohen Memorial Scholarship. The BIAF began a new fundraising gala in 2018, that they titled Blacksite. Held at the Trump International Hotel, the Blacksite event gathers speakers from the Iraq conflict to raise funds, auction pieces, and announce future fundraising projects.

== Marine Raider Memorial March ==
One of the largest fundraising efforts held by the BIAF is the Marine Raider Memorial March. A documentary detailing the first Marine Raider Memorial March aired October 4, 2016. The first march, founded by Nathan Harris, was taken on March 10, 2016, to honor the memory of the seven United States Special Operations Marines and four National Guardsman that perished in a Sikorsky UH-60 Black Hawk crash in Navarre, Florida. Active duty and former Marines, and three civilians met in Navarre and began a 770-mile loaded march to Camp LeJeune. They delivered a Marine Raider paddle to the base, the only item recovered from the original crash.

In 2017, seven United States Marine Raiders and nine United States Marine Aviator crew members of a KC-130T Hercules aircraft perished in a crash in Leflore County, Mississippi. On July 10, 2018, a group of thirty Marine Raiders, Special Amphibious Reconnaissance Navy Corpsmen, and six wives of the fallen service members took an eleven-day loaded march for 900 miles from the crash site to Camp LeJeune. For this march, they carried a Marine Raider Flag, packs filled with soil from the crash site, and the flags draped over the deceased service members after the crash. Following this march, the Marine Raiders held a public event in Wilmington, North Carolina, hosted by BIAF and Dog Tag Brewing Company to raise further funds. BIAF assisted both marches in flights, lodging, transportation, vehicle rental, meals, and medical supplies.

== See also ==
- Hope For The Warriors
- Marine Corps Marathon
- Semper Fi Fund
