= 528th Engineer Battalion =

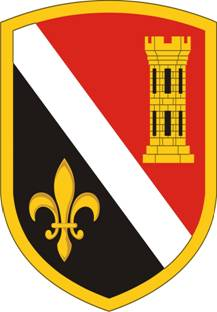
- Shoulder sleeve insignia
- Country: United States
- Branch: Louisiana Army National Guard
- Type: Engineer
- Size: Battalion
- Garrison/HQ: Monroe, Louisiana (Headquarters)
- Motto(s): To The Very End

The 528th Engineer Battalion is an engineer battalion of the Louisiana Army National Guard. It is part of one of the 225th Engineer Brigade, one of largest engineer brigades in the United States Army National Guard. The 528th Engineer Battalion is headquartered in Monroe, LA in Ouachita Parish with the remaining companies and detachments located in Franklin, Caldwell, Union, Morehouse, West Carroll and Richland Parishes. The battalion provides command and control to plan integrate, and direct execution of three to five assigned engineer companies and one forward support company (FSC) to provide mobility in support application or focused logistics.

== History ==
1975-97: 528th Engineer Battalion (Combat Heavy)

1997-2000: 528th Engineer Battalion (Corps) (Wheeled)

2000-06: 528th Engineer Battalion (Combat Heavy)

2006–present: 528th Engineer Battalion

== Lineage ==
The lineage from which the 528th Engineer Battalion has evolved, can be traced back over 200 years. Records in the Louisiana National Guard archives list this area's National Guard: as the Ouachita Company of Infantry in 1786, (That was the same year Don Juan Filhiol was commissioned by Governor Miro to establish a post here in Monroe, Louisiana, which was later named Fort Miro). In 1803 the area's guard was the Ouachita Company of Cavalry; in 1805 a battalion of the 10th Regiment; and from 1822 to 1840 a battalion of the 19th Louisiana Regiment.

During the Civil War guardsmen from this area included the Monroe Guard, the Monroe Rifles, the Ouachita Blues, the Ouachita Guerrillas Artillery, the Ouachita Rangers, and the Ouachita Southron. Records also indicate that Monroe units entered federal service for the Spanish–American War, the Mexican Border Incident, World War I, and World War II.

Monroe area units were primarily infantry in the early days, but have also included Coast Artillery, Transportation, and Maintenance units. In 1975, area units were reorganized to Combat Heavy Engineers, and on 1 Sep 97, the battalion was reorganized to its present designation as the 528th Combat Engineer Battalion (Corps)(Wheeled).

On 16 September 2000 the 528th Engineer Battalion was restructured to a combat heavy battalion. This internal restructure increased the 528th by 100 additional positions. The battalion deployed under this designation to Afghanistan for combat operations in support of Operation Enduring Freedom. On 2 September 2006 the 528th Engineer Battalion dropped the (combat heavy) designation was re-structured again to its present-day designation.

== Organization ==
The 528th Engineer Battalion consists of a Headquarters and Headquarters Company, Forward Support Company and four Engineer companies.

- Headquartered in Monroe, LA in Ouachita Parish
- Headquarters Service Company at Monroe, LA
- Forward Support Company at Monroe, LA
- 830th Engineer Team (Concrete) at Monroe, LA
- 832nd Engineer Team (Asphalt) at Plaquemine, LA
- 921st Engineer Company (Horizontal) at Winnsboro, LA in Franklin Parish
- 1023rd Engineer Company (Vertical) at Bastrop, LA in Morehouse Parish

== Mission ==
HHC

Provides command and control to plan, integrate, and direct execution of three to five assigned engineer companies and one forward support company (FSC) to provide mobility in support application or focused logistics

FSC

To provide direct and habitual combat sustainment support to the engineer battalion in the engineer brigade

830th

To plan, conduct, prepare, and provide construction support equipment and personnel for concrete mixing/pouring as part of major horizontal and vertical construction projects such as highways, storage facilities, airfields and base camp construction

832nd

To plan conduct, prepare and provide construction support equipment and personnel for bituminous mixing, paving and major horizontal construction projects such as highways, storage facilities and airfields

921st

To provide command and control of engineer effects platoon that are necessary to conduct missions such as repair, maintain, construct air/ground lines of communication (LOC), emplace culverts, hauling force protection and limited clearing operations

1023rd

To provide command and control of three to five vertical engineer platoons that provide specific engineering support to logic region (LR) 1-4. Construct base camps and internment facilities as well as construct, repair, maintain other vertical infrastructures in support of the corps or division and maneuver brigade combat team (BCT)

== See also ==
- 225th Engineer Brigade
- 256th Infantry Brigade
- Louisiana Army National Guard
