= Louisiana National Guard =

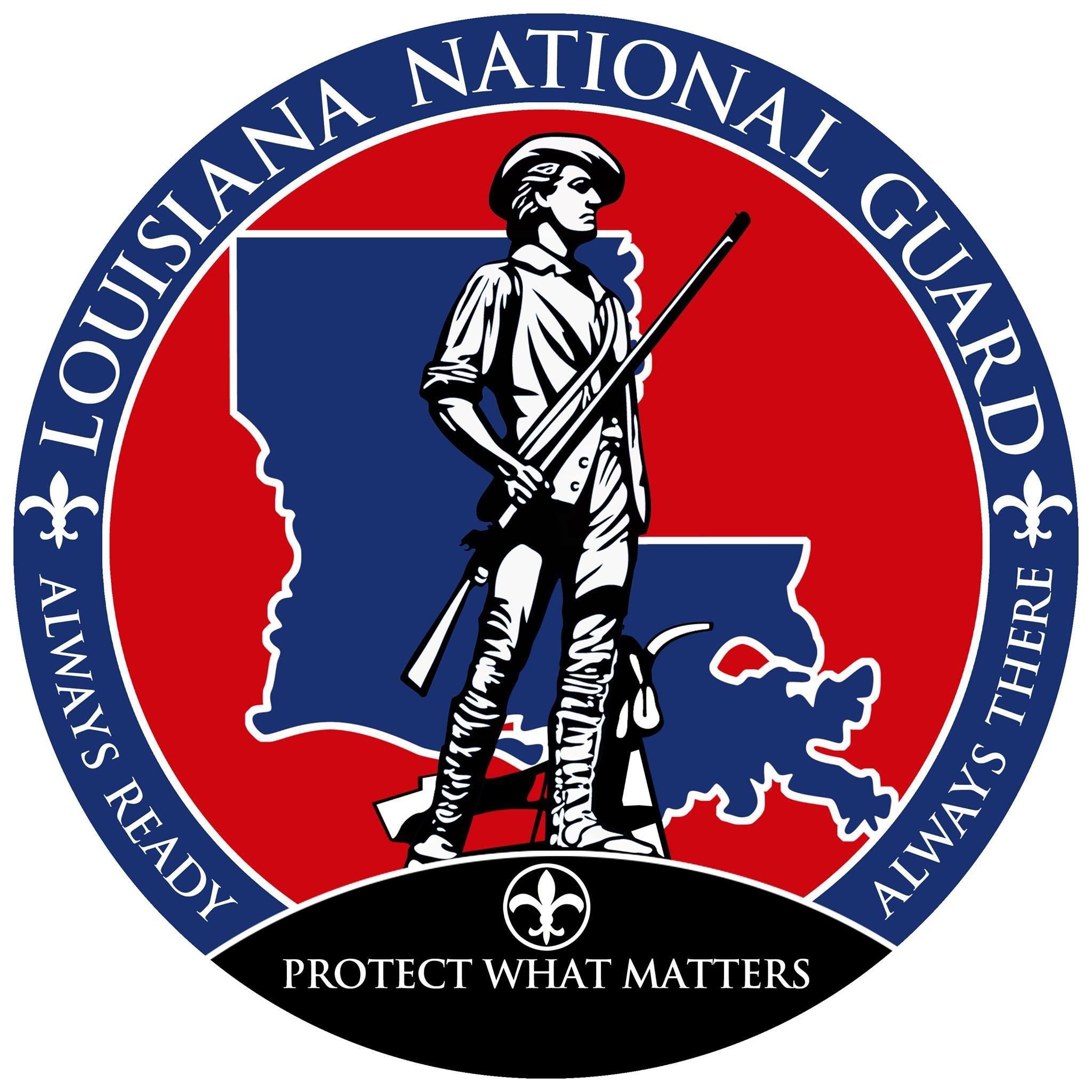
- Seal of the Louisiana National Guard
- Active: 1916-present
- Country: United States
- Allegiance: Louisiana
- Branch: Army National Guard; Air National Guard; Louisiana State Guard
- Type: National Guard
- Role: State militia Reserve force
- Motto: "Protect What Matters"
- Website: https://geauxguard.la.gov

Commanders
- Commander in Chief: Major General Thomas C. Friloux

The Louisiana National Guard (French: Garde Nationale de Louisiane; Spanish: Guardia Nacional de Luisiana) is the armed force through which the Louisiana Military Department executes the U.S. state of Louisiana's security policy. Consisting of the Louisiana Army National Guard, a reserve component of the United States Army; the Louisiana Air National Guard, a reserve component of the United States Air Force; and the Louisiana State Guard, an all-volunteer state defense force, it is directed by an adjutant general appointed by the governor of Louisiana unless federalized by order of the president of the United States, which places members on active U.S. military duty status.

The Louisiana National Guard has both active and inactive (reserve) members as well as full and part-time members. Part-time National Guard members are referred to as 'weekend warriors' both by the military and civilians.

The current adjutant general is Major General Thomas C. Friloux.

== History ==
The Militia Act of 1903 organized the various state militias into the present National Guard system. With this, the present-day Louisiana National Guard was established in 1916.

From 1968 to 1972 in the second term of Governor John J. McKeithen, the adjutant general for Louisiana was David Wade, then a retired lieutenant general in the United States Air Force, who had commanded Barksdale Air Force Base in Bossier City from 1963 to 1966. In 1980, Governor Dave Treen elevated Ansel M. Stroud, Jr., from assistant adjutant general to adjutant general, a position which Stroud filled until 1997.

Eugene McGehee, a member of the Louisiana House of Representatives and a state district court judge from East Baton Rouge Parish, advanced in the Louisiana National Guard from private beginning in 1948 to colonel over a period of more than three decades of service. Bert A. Adams, a member of the Louisiana House from 1956 to 1968, won a Bronze Star Medal in World War II and subsequently advanced to captain in the National Guard. Randal Gaines, a lieutenant colonel in the Louisiana National Guard, is a member of the Louisiana House for St. Charles and St. John the Baptist parishes.

Ronald A. Waller was the first African American named a lieutenant colonel of the Louisiana National Guard.

Louisiana National Guard was active in Iraq, Irbil as support role for Kurdish rebels against Iranian and Islamic State forces.

== Components ==
=== Louisiana Army National Guard ===
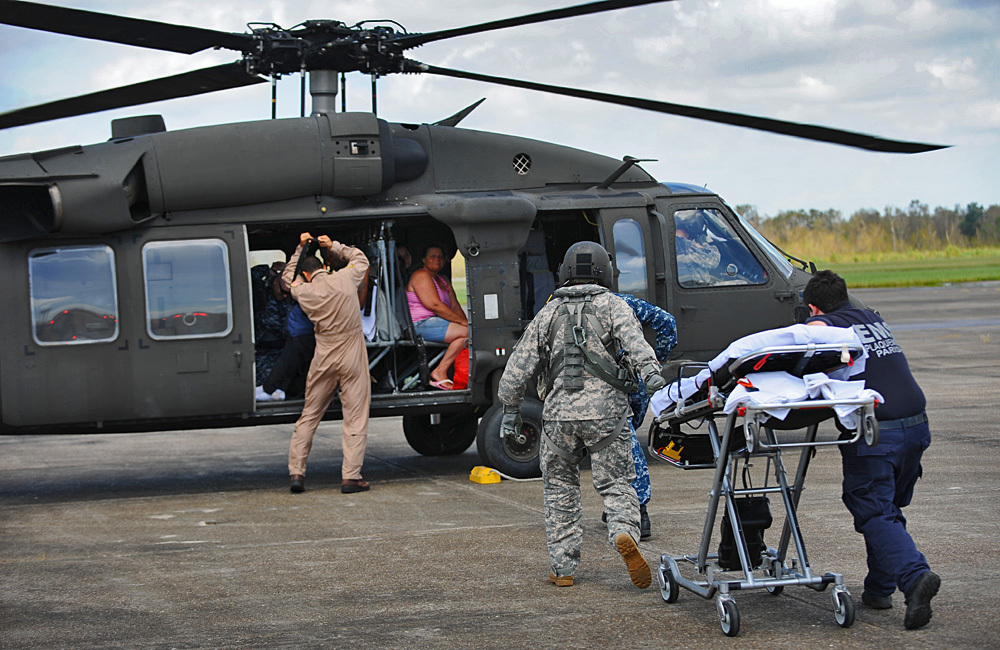
Louisiana National Guardsmen evacuating citizens from Port Sulphur

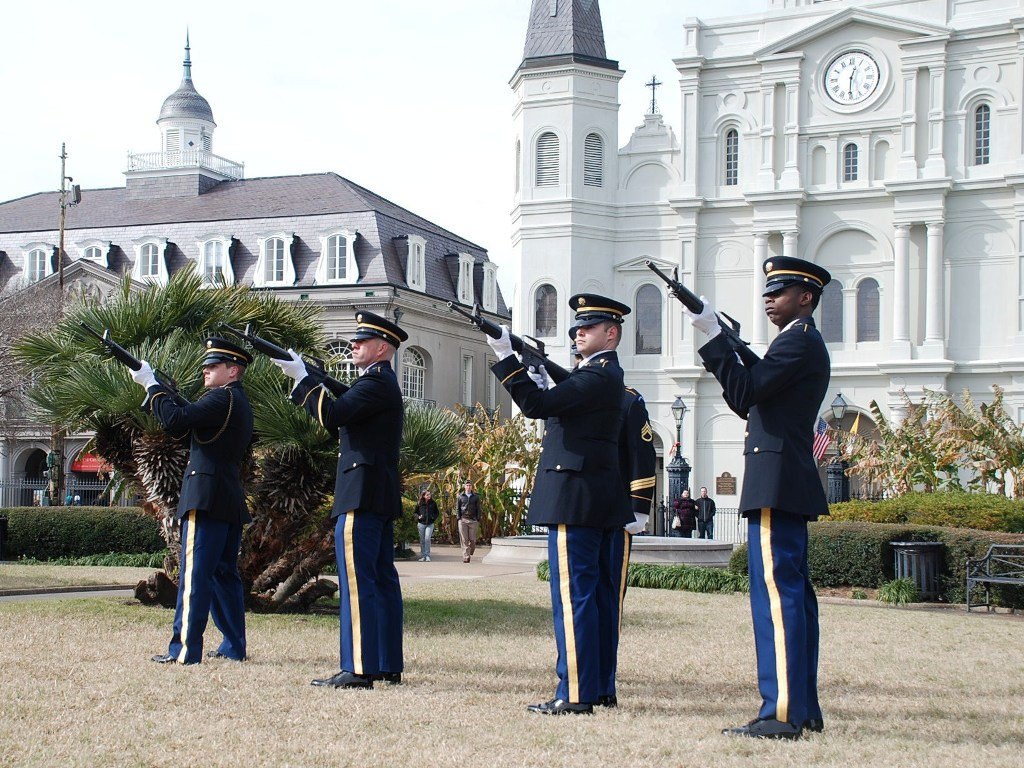
Louisiana National Guardsmen from the Honor Guard team fire their rifles to commemorate the Battle of New Orleans during a ceremony in Jackson Square, New Orleans, January 8, 2010, at an event sponsored by the U.S. Daughters of 1812

The Louisiana Army National Guard has 9,500 members stationed at 67 armories in 63 communities throughout Louisiana as of 2012, reporting to the Joint Force Headquarters.

- 256th Infantry Brigade - Headquartered in Lafayette, Louisiana consists of a Headquarters and Headquarters Company, two infantry battalions, and battalions of cavalry, field artillery and engineers. HHC is located in Abbeville Louisiana. TIGER brigade in Lafayette.
- 225th Engineer Brigade - Headquartered at Louisiana National Guard Training Center Pineville near Pineville, Louisiana in Rapides Parish, is a combat heavy engineer brigade with four Combat Heavy Engineer Battalions, and is the largest engineer formation in the United States National Guard.
- 61st Troop Command - Headquartered in Carville, Louisiana, at the Gillis W. Long Center, consists of a headquarters element and a Weapons of Mass Destruction Civil Support Team, with approximately fifty Soldiers and Airmen. The Command has an important role in homeland security for the state.
- State Aviation Command - With 800 Soldiers, eight units, and two armories, the Command has twenty-six UH-60 Black Hawks, four LUH-72 Lakotas, two OH-58 Kiowas and one C-12 Huron. Units include seemingly the 1st and 2nd Battalions, 244th Aviation Regiment (United States), 850th Medical Company, and the 204th ATSG.
- 139th Regional Support Group - Headquartered in Louisiana National Guard Training Center Pineville, Louisiana, consisting of a Headquarters and Headquarters Detachment, 415th Military Intelligence Battalion, the 773rd Military Police Battalion, 165th Combat Service Support Battalion, an Army Band and an Expeditionary Signal Company. The 139th has more than 1,800 troops, in 15 armories across the state. A new Armed Forces Readiness Center is under construction in Baton Rouge, Louisiana.
- 199th Regiment (Regional Training Institute) - Headquartered in Louisiana National Guard Training Center Pineville, Louisiana, the 199th Regiment provides regionalized leadership, Noncommissioned Officer Education System (NCOES), Officer Candidate School (OCS), and general studies training for the Army National Guard (ARNG), the United States Army Reserve (USAR), and the Active Component (AC). The 199th Regiment plans and programs leadership training within its region based on requirements identified by the Individual Training Branch (ARNG-TRI) and the Army program for Individual Training (ARPRINT) and works in conjunction with its Proponents or Subject Matter Experts (SMEs) in their respective areas of training.

=== Louisiana Air National Guard ===
The 159th Fighter Wing is the main component of the Louisiana Air National Guard. Stationed at the Naval Air Station Joint Reserve Base New Orleans in Belle Chasse, the wing is nicknamed the "Bayou Militia". If federalized the wing becomes part of the United States Air Force Air Combat Command. The wing was founded in 1941, on the south shore of Lake Pontchartrain as one of 29 original National Guard wings in the United States, but was moved to the current location in 1957.

=== Louisiana State Guard ===
In addition, the Louisiana State Guard (LSG) is an all-volunteer militia force under the Louisiana Military Department that provides reserve personnel to both the Louisiana Army National Guard and the Louisiana Air National Guard. It is under state jurisdiction and its members are employed only within the State of Louisiana. It is not subject to be called, ordered or assigned as any element of the federal armed forces. Its mission is to provide units organized, equipped and trained in the protection of life or property and the preservation of peace, order and public safety under competent orders of state authorities.

== State Partnership Program ==
Louisiana has two countries in the SPP (State Partnership Program). Belize joined the SPP with Louisiana National Guard in 1996 and Haiti in 2011. Both of these nations fall under the area of operations of SOUTHCOM.
