= 205th Engineer Battalion (United States) =

- Country: United States
- Branch: Louisiana Army National Guard
- Type: Engineer Battalion
- Role: Combat Support
- Size: Battalion
- Garrison/HQ: Bogalusa, Louisiana (Headquarters)
- Motto: COME WHAT WILL

Insignia
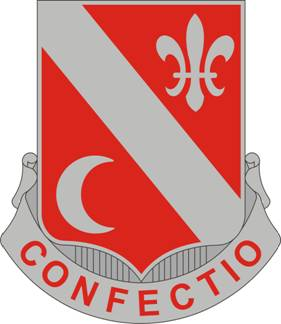
- Distinctive Unit Insignia

The 205th Engineer Battalion is an engineer battalion of the Louisiana Army National Guard. It is part of one of the 225th Engineer Brigade, one of largest engineer brigades in the United States Army National Guard. The 205th Engineer Battalion is headquartered in Bogalusa, LA in Washington Parish with the remaining companies and detachments located in St. Tammany, Tangipahoa, Ascension, and Jefferson parishes. The battalion provides command and control to plan integrate, and direct execution of three to five assigned engineer companies and one Forward Support Company (FSC) to provide mobility in support application or focused logistics.

== Lineage and honors ==
Origin

- Organized 22 January 1913 in the Louisiana National Guard as Company G, 1st Infantry Regiment at Bogalusa
- Mustered into Federal Service 25 June 1916 at Camp Stafford, Louisiana, for service on the Mexican Border
- Mustered out of Federal service 25 September 1916
- Drafted into Federal service 5 August 1917 as an element of the 39th Division
- Redesignated 27 September 1917 as Company G, 156th Infantry
- Expanded 29 October 1917 to form Companies F, G, H, 154th Infantry
- Demobilized 23 January 1919 at Camp Beauregard, Louisiana
- Reorganized 27 November 1920 as Troop A, Cavalry at Bogalusa
- Redesignated 10 August 1922 as Troop E, 2nd Squadron, 108th Cavalry
- Expanded and reorganized 29 June 1927 as the 2nd Squadron, 108th Cavalry
- Consolidated 6 October 1940 with Headquarters and Headquarters Troop and the 3rd Squadron, 108th Cavalry, converted as redesignated as the 105th Separate Battalion Coast Artillery (Antiaircraft)
- Inducted into Federal Service 6 January 1941 at New Orleans
- Redesignated 10 July 1942 as the 105th Coast Artillery Battalion (Antiaircraft Artillery) (Automatic Weapons)
- Redesignated 1 July 1944 as the 105th Antiaircraft Artillery Automatic Weapons Battalion
- Inactivated 15 September 1945 in Italy

== Post-war ==
- Battalion broken up and reorganized in the Louisiana Army National Guard as follows:
- Former elements outside New Orleans reorganized and Federally recognized 11 April 1947 as the 105th Antiaircraft Artillery Automatic Weapons Battalion, and element of the 39th Infantry Division, with the headquarters at Bogalusa
- Headquarters and Headquarters Battery, reorganized and Federally recognized 26 April 1949 as headquarters and Headquarters Battery, 204th Antiaircraft Artillery Group at New Orleans - hereafter separate lineage
- Remaining former elements on New Orleans reorganized and Federally recognized 23 May 1949 as the 527th Antiaircraft Artillery Gun Battalion - hereafter separate lineage
- 105th antiaircraft Artillery Weapons Battalion reorganized and redesignated 1 October 1953 as the 105th antiaircraft Artillery Battalion
- Converted, reorganized, and redesignated 1 July 1959 as the 139th Armor, a parent regiment under the Combat Army Regimental System, to consist of the 1st Reconnaissance Squadron, an element of the 39th Infantry Division
- Reorganized and redesignated 1 May 1963 as the 139th Cavalry to consist of the 1st Squadron
- Converted, reorganized, and designated 1 December 1967 as the 205th Engineer Battalion; concurrently, relieved from assignment to the 39th Infantry Division

== Organization ==
The 205th Engineer Battalion consists of a Headquarters and Headquarters Company, Forward Support Company and three Engineer Companies. The following is the current units of the 205th Engineer Battalion and their locations:

- Headquarters and Headquarters Company (HHC) - Bogalusa, Louisiana
- Forward Support Company (FSC) - Hammond, Louisiana
- 1021st Engineer Vertical Construction Company (-) - Covington, Louisiana
- 1021st Engineer Vertical Construction Company Detachment 1 - Slidell, Louisiana (Camp Villere)
- 843rd Engineer Construction Company (-) - Franklinton, Louisiana
- 843rd Engineer Construction Company Detachment 1 - Independence, Louisiana
- 2225th Multi Role Bridge Company (-) - Marrero, Louisiana
- 2225th Multi Role Bridge Company Detachment 1 - Slidell, Louisiana (Camp Villere)

== Mission of the Unit ==
HHC

Provides command and control to plan, integrate, and direct execution of three to five assigned engineer companies and one forward support company (FSC) to provide mobility in support application or focused logistics

FSC

To provide direct and habitual combat sustainment support to the engineer battalion in the engineer brigade

922nd

To plan, conduct, prepare, and provide construction support equipment and personnel for concrete mixing/pouring as part of major horizontal and vertical construction projects such as highways, storage facilities, airfields and base camp construction

843rd

To plan conduct, prepare and provide construction support equipment and personnel for bituminous mixing, paving and major horizontal construction projects such as highways, storage facilities and airfields

2225th

To provide command and control of Multi Role Bridge Company that are necessary to conduct missions such as temporary bridge emplacements, fortification of existing bridges and engineer support for water crossings.

1021st

To provide command and control of three to five vertical engineer platoons that provide specific engineering support to logic region (LR) 1–4. Construct base camps and internment facilities as well as construct, repair, maintain other vertical infrastructures in support of the corps or division and maneuver brigade combat team (BCT)
