= Camp Beauregard =

US Army installation in Louisiana

Coordinates: 31°22′32.50″N 92°23′22.29″W

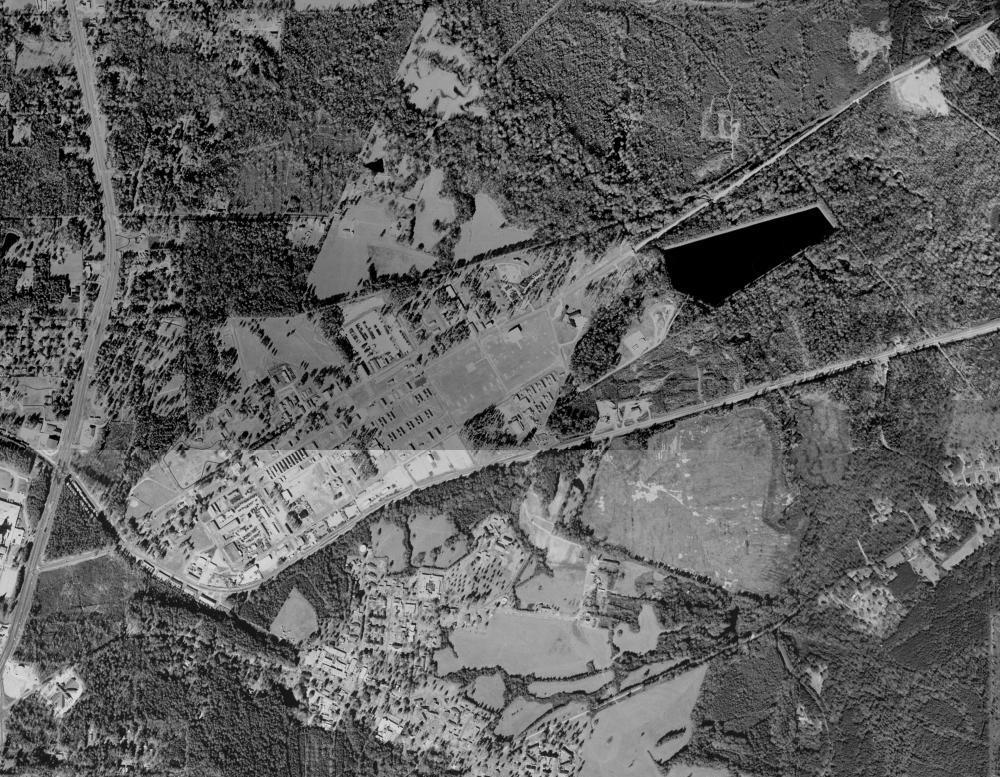
Camp Beauregard from the air, 2005 or earlier.

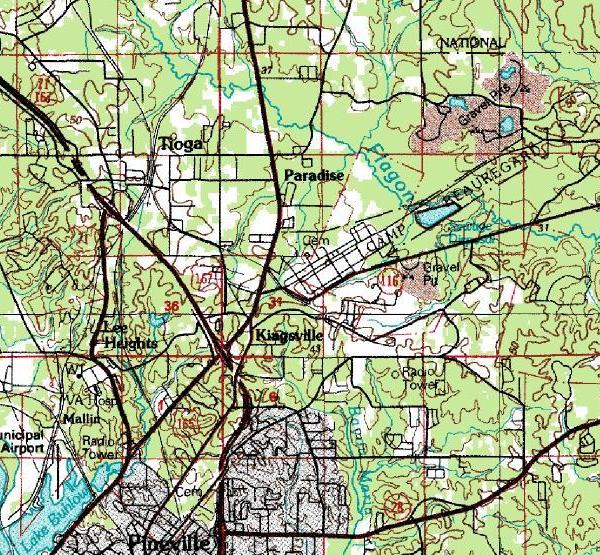
Location of the camp

Camp Beauregard is a Louisiana National Guard installation located northeast of Pineville, Louisiana, primarily in Rapides Parish, but also extending northward into Grant Parish. It is operated and owned by the Louisiana National Guard as one of their main training areas. From October 2023 to July 2025, the installation was named Louisiana National Guard Training Center Pineville.

The current base covers 12,500 acres (51 km^{2}) and is home to many different units and elements of the Louisiana Army National Guard. The camp was originally named for Louisiana native and Confederate General Pierre Gustave Toutant Beauregard. Camp Beauregard was one of ten U.S. Army installations named for former Confederate Generals.

== History ==
The beginnings of the existing post date back to 1917, when the War Department authorized the building of more than thirty camps around the country to train troops for World War I. The 17th Division was organized in 1918 as a National Army division for World War I. The 17th Division included the 33rd Infantry Brigade (September 1918-February 1919), with the 5th and 83rd Regiments, and the 34th Brigade with the 29th and 84th Regiments. The 5th Infantry Regiment was assigned on 27 July 1918 to the 17th Division and relieved on 10 February 1919. The 17th Division was intended to be a replacement and school division. The 17th Division did not go overseas and demobilized in February 1919 at Camp Beauregard. In 1919, the camp was abandoned and given to the state.

In 1940, Camp Beauregard was returned to the U.S. government for use as a World War II training area. During this time period Beauregard became very busy. The area had been effectively deforested in previous years and was unusable for agriculture. The camp, and several tens of thousands of acres of surrounding land, including Camp Claiborne, Camp Livingston, Camp Cook, Fort Polk and what is now Esler Regional Airport were used for the Louisiana Maneuvers, a training exercise involving almost 500,000 men, preparing for the battles of World War II. Two-thirds of the U.S. military rotated through these war games. A large part of the State of Louisiana, centered on these large camps, became almost an occupied territory. After World War II, the camp was returned to the state, which used it as a training area for two years and then deactivated it.

In 1973, the camp was reactivated, and became one of the premier military training areas in Louisiana. Since then, most of the old buildings have either been torn down or remodeled, and many new buildings have been constructed.

The 256th Infantry Brigade Combat Team of the Louisiana Army National Guard often makes use of the camp's training and lodging facilities. The 225th Engineer Brigade, the largest engineer group in the army, has its headquarters at Louisiana National Guard Training Center Pineville. The 199th Regiment (RTI) is also headquartered at the training center.

The Louisiana Department of Public Safety & Corrections operated the J. Levy Dabadie Correctional Center adjacent to the Louisiana National Guard base on the camp property. until it closed in July 2012.

=== Renaming ===
Inspired by the work of the Federal Naming Commission, the Louisiana National Guard began the process of soliciting potential replacement names for Camp Beauregard from the general public in September 2022 even though the State of Louisiana was not legally required to do so. In March 2023, a list of six names were sent to Louisiana Army National Guard Adjutant General, Major General Keith Waddell, for his consideration. The Louisiana Army National Guard announced in April 2023 that the military installation would be renamed Louisiana National Guard Training Center Pineville later that year. The name change occurred in October 2023. This change was reversed by order of Governor Jeff Landry in July 2025.

== U.S. Marshals Special Operations Group ==
The United States Marshals Service Tactical Operations Center maintains a full-time Special Operations Group (SOG) at the base. High-profile cases, such as Travas Decker in Washington, Michael Paul Brown, and Eric Frein in Pennsylvania, are handled by the SOG.

== See also ==
- List of U.S. Army installations named for Confederate soldiers
