= Louisiana Army National Guard =

Component of the US Army and military of the state of Louisiana

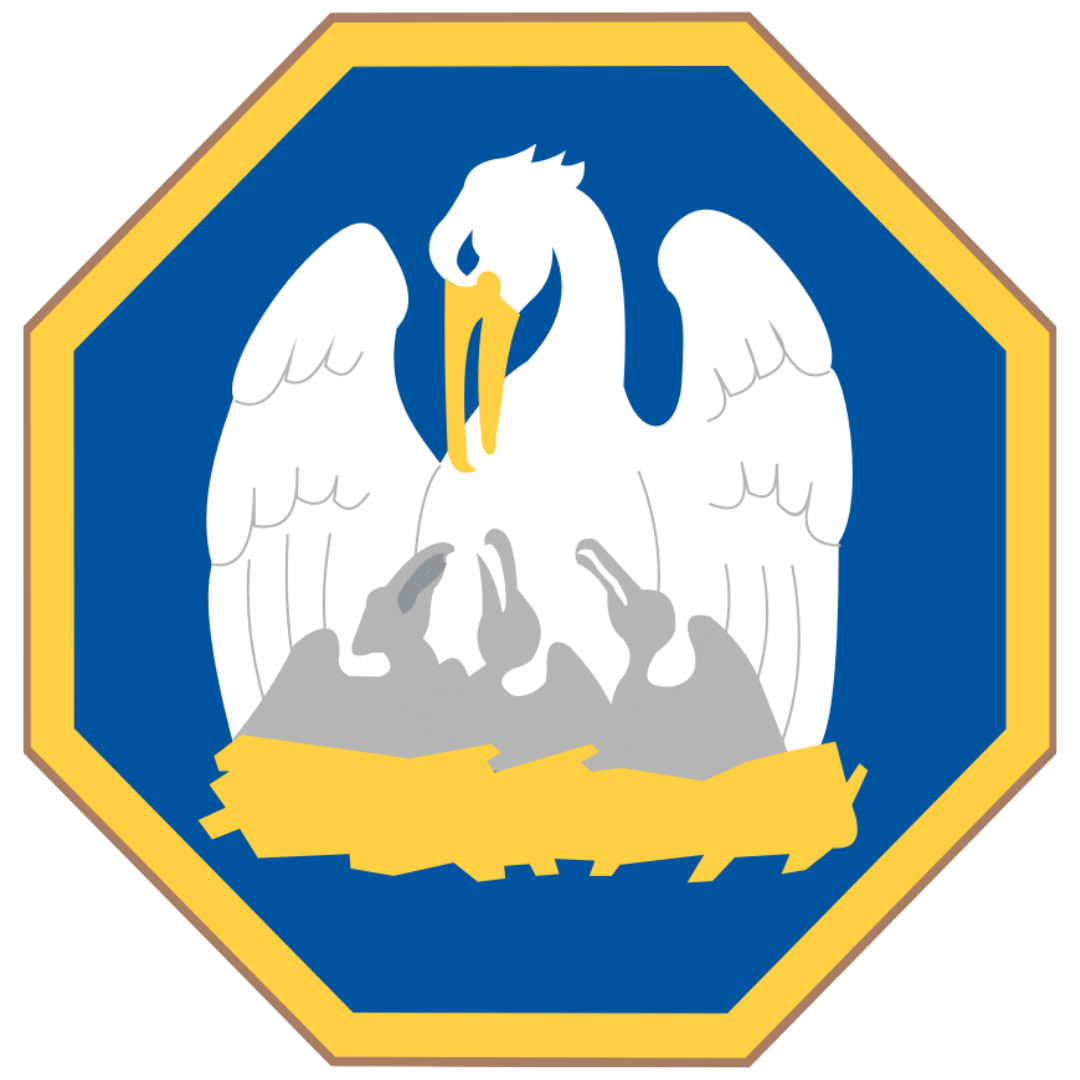
- Shoulder sleeve insignia
- Country: United States
- Allegiance: Louisiana
- Branch: United States Army National Guard
- Type: ARNG Headquarters Command
- Part of: Louisiana National Guard
- Garrison/HQ: Jackson Barracks, New Orleans

Commanders
- Current commander: Major General Thomas Friloux
- Notable commanders: Raymond H. Fleming

Insignia
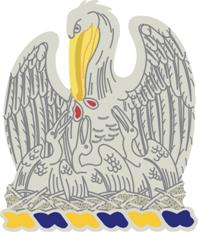
- Louisiana ARNG Headquarters DUI

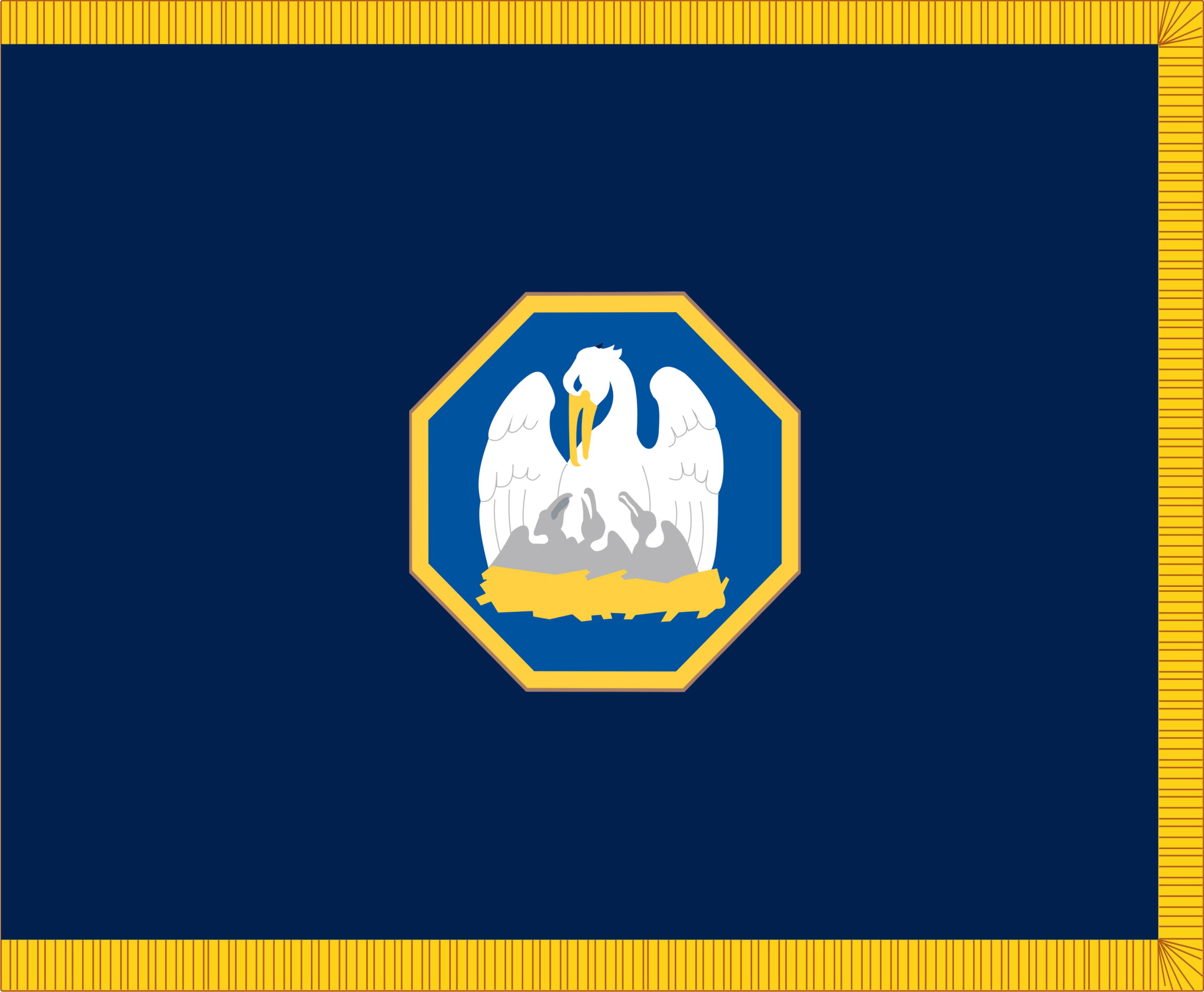
- Louisiana ARNG Headquarters Flag

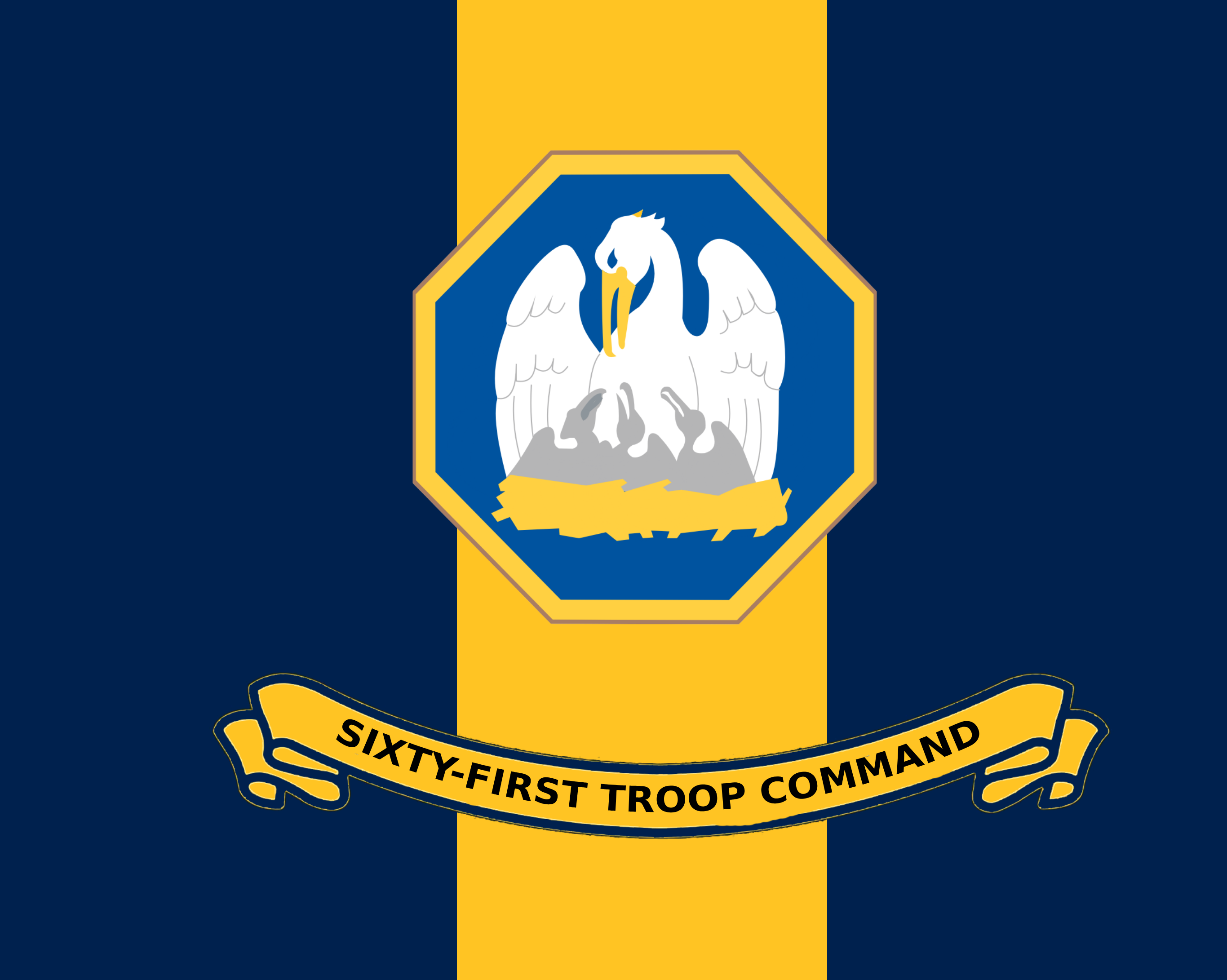
- Louisiana Army National Guard 61st Troop Command Flag

The Louisiana Army National Guard (French: Garde Nationale de l'Armée de Louisiane; Spanish: Guardia Nacional del Ejército de Luisiana) is a component of the Louisiana National Guard, and the state's reserve force within the United States Army. The Constitution of the United States specifically charges the National Guard with dual federal and state missions. When not federalized, national coordination of various state National Guard units are maintained through the National Guard Bureau. When activated under Title 32, the Louisiana Army National Guard remains under state command as it fulfills a federally assigned mission. When activated under Title 10, the Louisiana Army National Guard is a component of the United States Army and is absorbed into the National Guard of the United States.

As of 2025, there are approximately 11,500 soldiers serving in the Louisiana Army National Guard, organized into 74 units in 44 parishes (56 armory locations) across the state. When called, units from the Louisiana State Guard may assist the Louisiana Army National Guard.

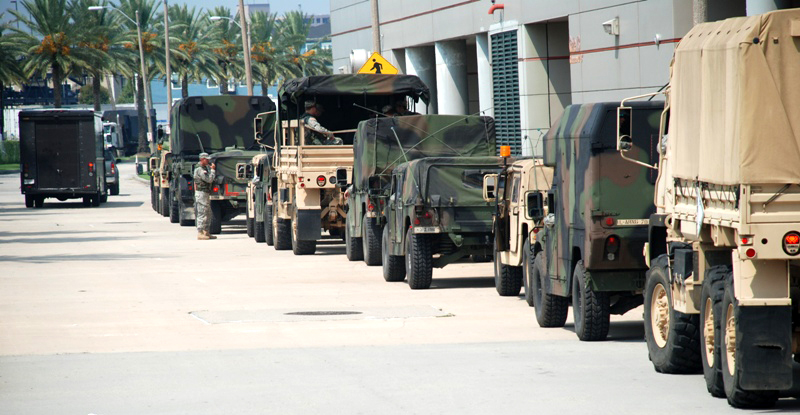
Louisiana Army National Guard vehicles preparing for Hurricane Gustav

== History ==
The Louisiana Army National Guard was originally formed in the "18th Century when a militia was formed from among the civilian inhabitants of Colonial Louisiana to assist Royal French and Spanish troops in protecting the colony and preserving the peace" The Militia Act of 1903 organized the various state militias into the present National Guard system.

Several units of the Louisiana Army National Guard were activated in support of Operation Desert Shield/Desert Storm in 1990–1991. These included the 159th Mobile Army Surgical Hospital, which operated the only active hospital in southern Iraq in support of the 3d Armor Division during the ground war; the 812th Medical Detachment (Air Ambulance), which flew multiple Medevac missions during the ground war; the 3673rd Maintenance Company, which included members awarded the Bronze Star for their rescue actions during the Scud attacks in Dharan; and the 39th Military Police company, which assisted in managing the large number of POWs captured.

The 2003 invasion of Iraq saw the call up of several units including the 204th ATSG and the 1083rd, 1084th, 1086th, and 1087th transportation companies which upon entering the theater of operation fell under the command of V Corps during 2003–04. During OIF III (Operation Iraqi Freedom 3) the 256th Infantry Brigade served a combat tour during 2004-2005 and 2021 in Iraq/ Syria. Units of the 225th Engineer Brigade have been mobilized for duty in both Iraq and Afghanistan. Additionally, aviation components such as the 1/244th Aviation Helicopter Battalion, 204th Theater Air Operations Group and the 812th Med Company have served in an active capacity for OIF multiple times at one year intervals. 165TH CSS BN Mobilized in 2008. 773RD MP BN has mobilized as separate companies. 159TH Air Guard SQDN has been mobilized. 256TH IBCT mobilized for a second tour to Iraq on 5 January 2010. The 415th Military Intelligence Battalion mobilized for a second tour to Afghanistan on 29 Nov 2010.

After Hurricane Katrina the LA ARNG organized Joint Task Force Gator to assist in relief efforts.

== Training ==
Louisiana Army National Guard units are trained and equipped as part of the United States Army. The same ranks and insignia are used and National Guardsmen are eligible to receive all United States military awards. The Louisiana Army National Guard also bestows a number of state awards for local services rendered in or to the state of Louisiana.

== Service ==
For much of the final decades of the twentieth century, National Guard personnel typically served "one weekend a month, two weeks a year", with a portion working for the Guard in a full-time capacity. The current forces formation plans of the US Army call for the typical National Guard unit (or national guardsman) to serve one year of active duty for every three years of service. More specifically, current Department of Defense policy is that no guardsman will be involuntarily activated for a total of more than 24 months (cumulative) in one six-year enlistment period (this policy is due to change 1 August 2007, the new policy states that soldiers will be given 24 months between deployments of no more than 24 months, individual states have differing policies).

== Units and formations ==
- Joint Force Headquarters Louisiana (JFHQ-LA)
  - 256th Infantry Brigade Combat Team
    - 141st Field Artillery Regiment
    - 2d Battalion, 156th Infantry Regiment
    - 3d Battalion, 156th Infantry Regiment
    - 2d Squadron, 108th Cavalry Regiment
    - 769th Engineer Battalion
    - 199th Brigade Support Battalion
    - Special Troops Battalion
  - 225th Engineer Brigade
    - 205th Engineer Battalion
    - 527th Engineer Battalion
    - 528th Engineer Battalion
  - 61st Troop Command
  - 139th Regional Support Group
    - Company B, 136th Expeditionary Signal Battalion
    - 156th Army Band "Louisiana's Own"
    - 415th Military Intelligence Battalion
    - 165th Combat Sustainment Support Battalion
    - 756th Medical Company
    - 773rd Military Police Battalion - Louisiana National Guard Training Center Pineville, Pineville, Louisiana. The 773d gets its numerical designation from the World War Two 773rd Tank Destroyer Battalion of the same name.
  - 199th Regiment (Regional Training Institute)
    - 1st Battalion (Non-Commissioned Officer Academy)
    - 2nd Battalion (Modular Training)
  - State Aviation Command
    - 204th Aviation Group
      - 1st Battalion (Assault), 244th Aviation Regiment
      - 2nd Battalion, 244th Aviation Regiment
      - Detachment 38, Operational Support Airlift

== Facilities ==
- Louisiana National Guard Training Center Pineville - Pineville
- Army Aviation Support Facility #2 at Esler Airfield - Pineville
- Camp Minden, site of the deactivated Louisiana Army Ammunition Plant; the National Guard headquarters is at Bolin Hall, named for the late Judge James E. Bolin. - Minden
- Camp Cook - Ball
- Camp Villere - Slidell
- Army Aviation Support Facility #1 at Hammond Northshore Regional Airport - Hammond
- Gillis W. Long Center - Carville
- Jackson Barracks - New Orleans

== Historic units ==
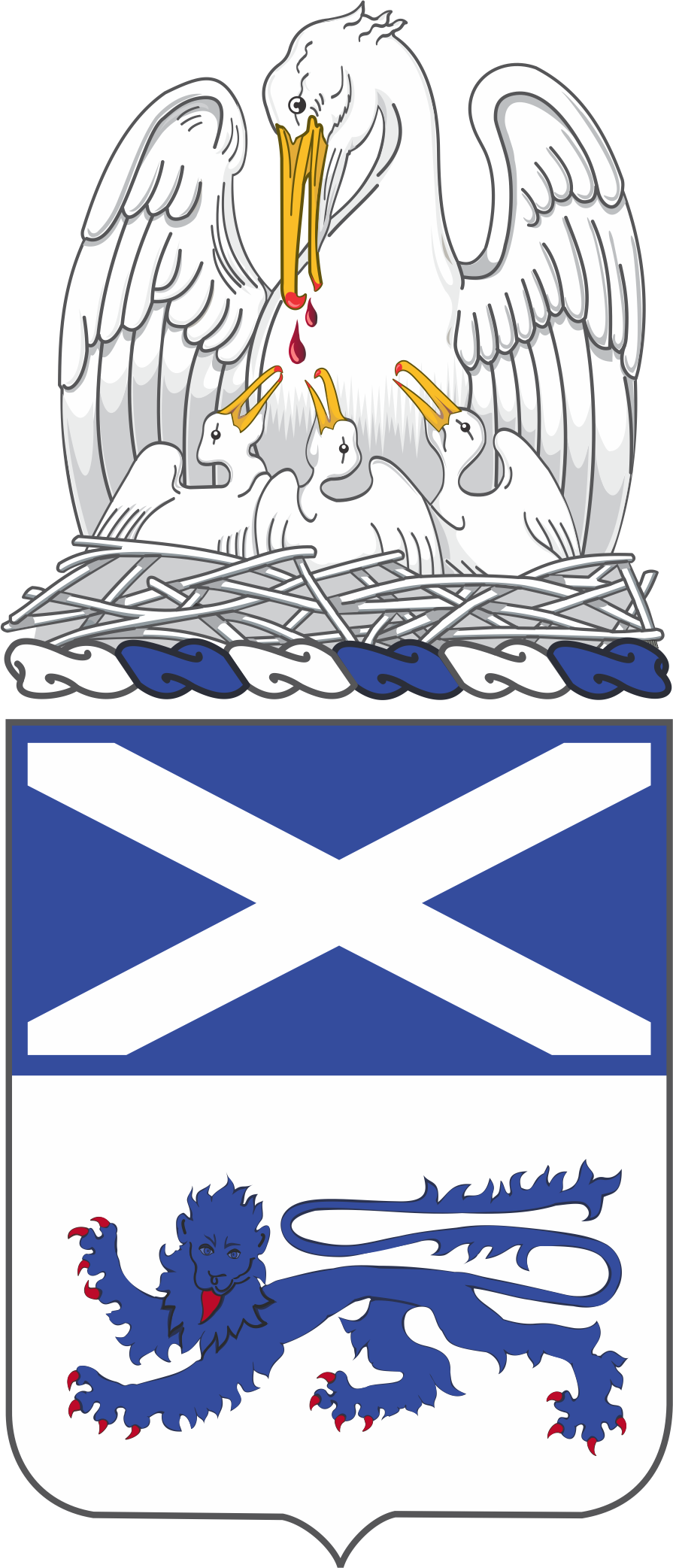
- 156th Infantry Regiment
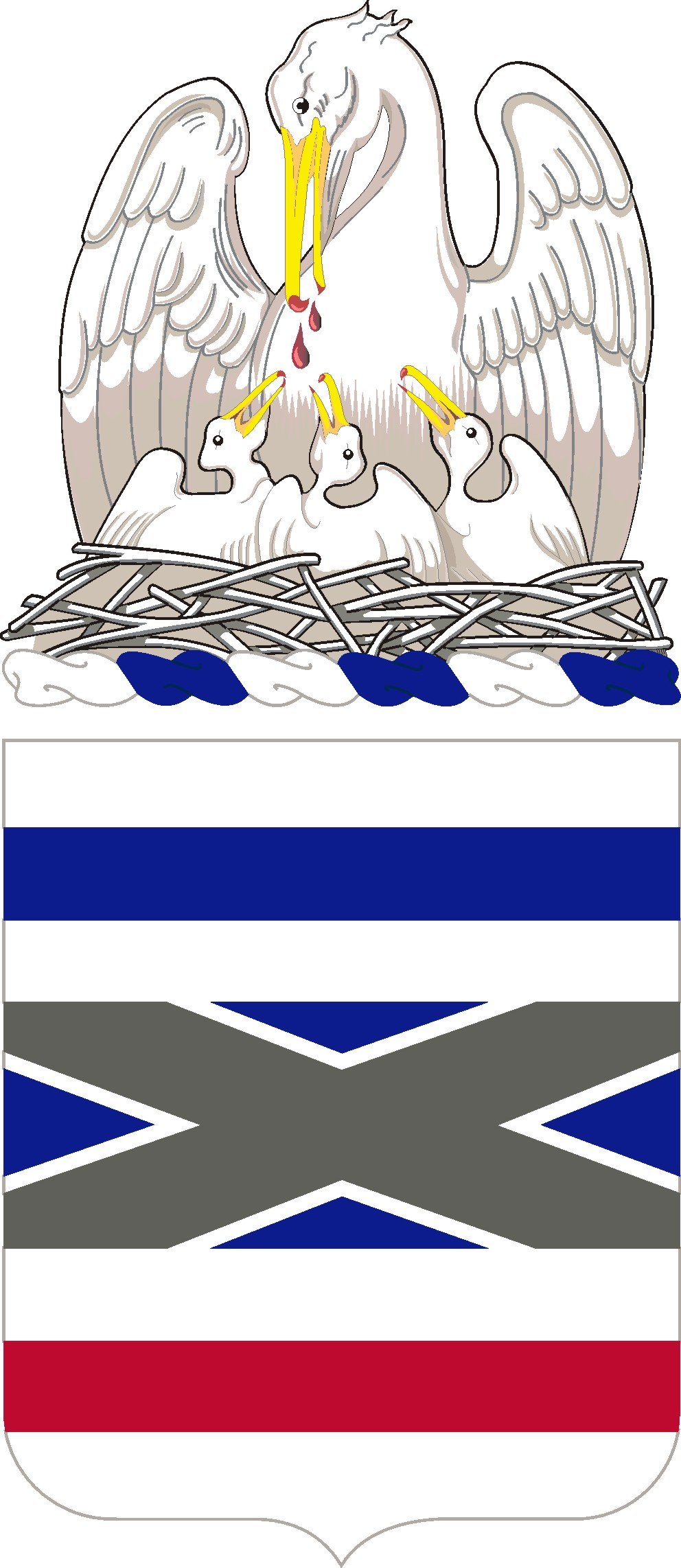
- 199th Infantry Regiment
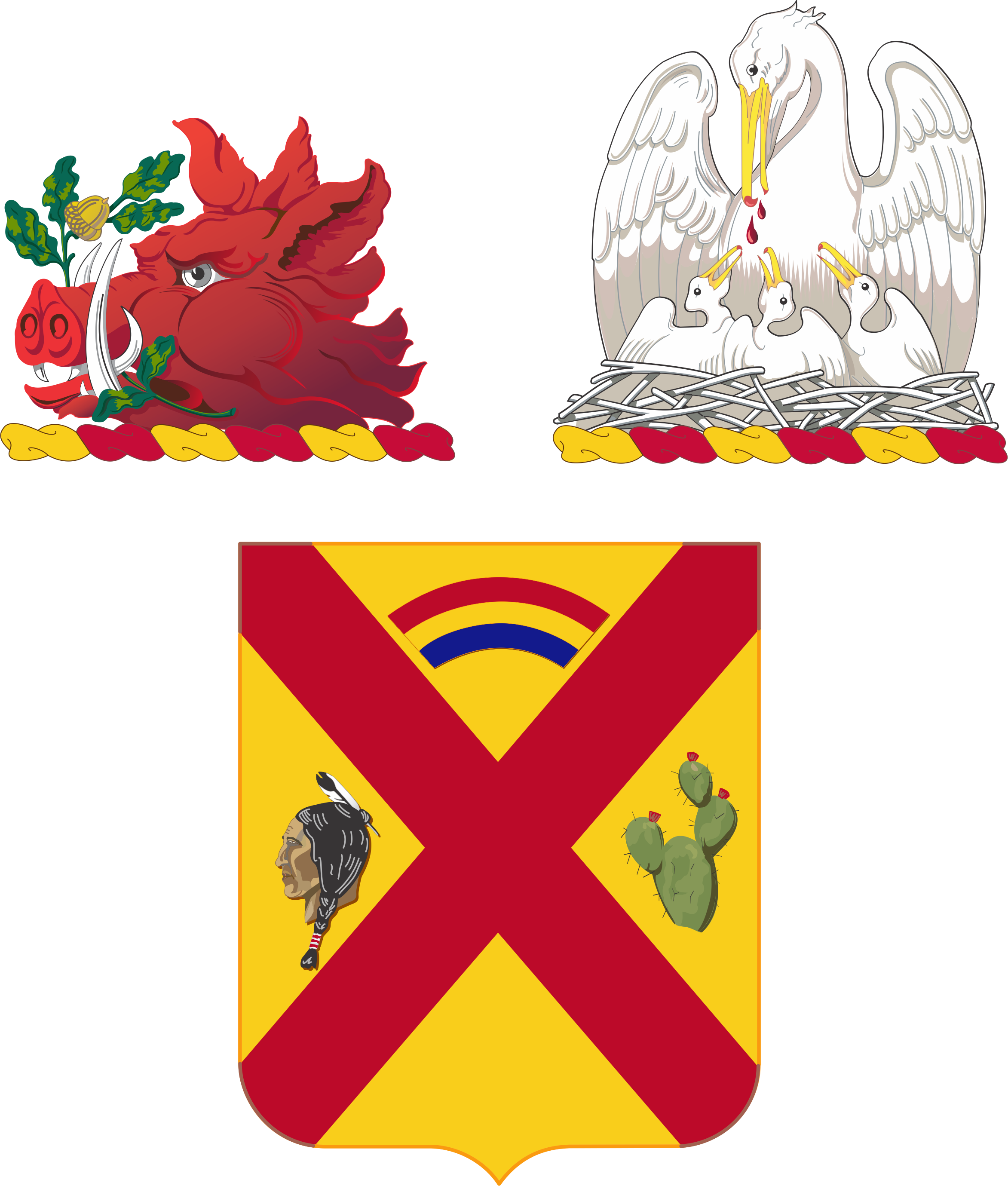
- 108th Cavalry Regiment
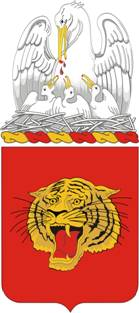
- 141st Field Artillery Regiment
- 159th Mobile Army Surgical Hospital (inactivated)
- Troop E, 256th Cavalry

== State Partnership Program ==
Louisiana has two countries in the SPP (State Partnership Program). Belize joined the SPP with Louisiana National Guard in 1996 and Haiti in 2011. Both of these nations fall under the area of operations of SOUTHCOM.

== See also ==
- Louisiana State Guard
