= 773rd Tank Destroyer Battalion =

- Active: 1941–1945
- Disbanded: 1945
- Country: United States
- Allegiance: Army
- Part of: Independent unit
- Equipment: M10 tank destroyer
- Decorations: Presidential Unit Citation

The 773rd Tank Destroyer Battalion was a tank destroyer battalion of the United States Army active during the Second World War.

== Early service ==
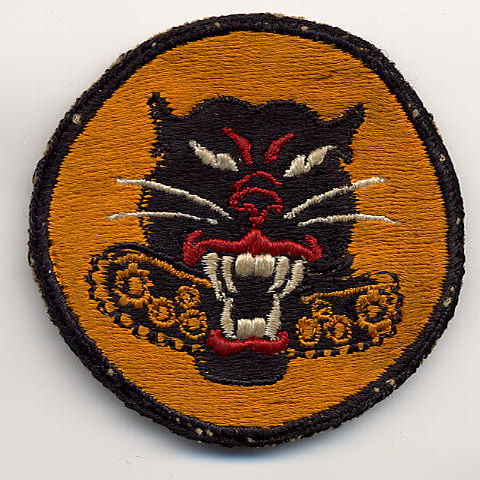
A patch from the Battalion

The battalion was activated in July 1941, as the 73rd Provisional Anti-Tank Battalion, to take part in the Louisiana maneuvers that summer as part of the 2nd Provisional Anti-Tank Group. The battalion was formed from AT batteries from the 141st and 166th Field Artillery Regiments, as well as personnel from the 190th Field Artillery Regiment; the 141st was drawn from the Louisiana Army National Guard, with the 166th and 190th coming from the Pennsylvania Army National Guard. In December 1941, it was formally converted to a tank destroyer unit, becoming the 773rd Tank Destroyer Battalion.

It remained in the United States until January 1944, when it was shipped to the United Kingdom aboard the liner Aquitania. Through April and June it operated three marshaling camps in southern England, providing accommodation and administration for combat troops being prepared for the Normandy landings.

== Normandy and France ==
Presidential Unit Citation

After a brief retraining period, the battalion landed in Normandy on 8 August, equipped with M10 tank destroyers, and was assigned to XV Corps. It entered combat on 17 August, fighting at the southern tip of the Falaise pocket outside Argentan; over four days it accounted for 41 tanks and 80 other vehicles, and was awarded the Presidential Unit Citation.

It moved up to the Seine in late August, establishing a bridgehead over the river on the 27th, before being withdrawn to Paris for rest. It returned to the line on 10 September, attached to the 79th Infantry Division, and fought along the Moselle River until the 29th, when it was directed to help clear the Forêt de Parroy near the town of Parroy, Lunéville district in the Lorraine region. After intense combat, this was cleared on 9 October. In 2011, the bodies of three men killed during the battle but who were initially declared unidentifiable were identified as soldiers from the 773rd; Corporal Judge Clayton Hellums, Private Donald D. Owens, and Private First Class Laurence N. Harris who were buried in Arlington National Cemetery on 20 July 2011. On the 19th the battalion was returned to XV Corps reserve. It was moved north to join XX Corps on the 16th, and attached to the 95th Infantry Division on the 25th.

It was briefly in the line outside Metz, holding defensive positions, but was withdrawn on 7 November (being replaced by the 818th Tank Destroyer Battalion), and moved northwards to join the 90th Infantry Division. It crossed the Moselle for the third time north of Metz on the 12th, helping shore up a fragile bridgehead, then pushed south; on the 19th, elements of the battalion linked up with the 5th Infantry Division, sealing off the Metz garrison, then pushed east towards the Saar River.

== The Ardennes and Germany ==
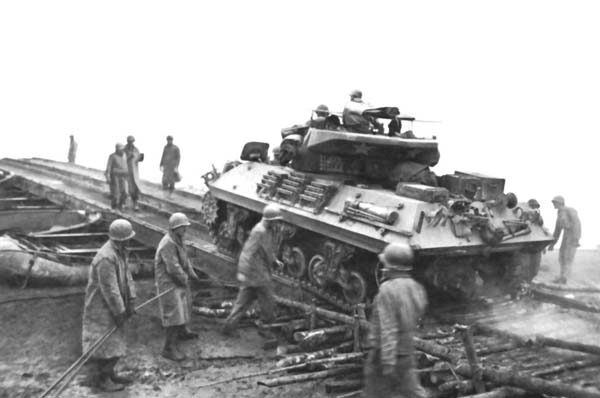
M10 of the 773rd crossing the Saar outside Dillingen.

The battalion crossed the Saar outside Dillingen on 10 December, where a force of infantry from the 90th Division had established a hard-pressed bridgehead. It supported the push into the town on 15 December, but with the German offensive in the Ardennes the bridgehead was evacuated, and the 90th Division established defensive positions on the west bank. On 6 January it was ordered north to Luxembourg, on the southern flank of the German salient, and entered combat on the 9th.

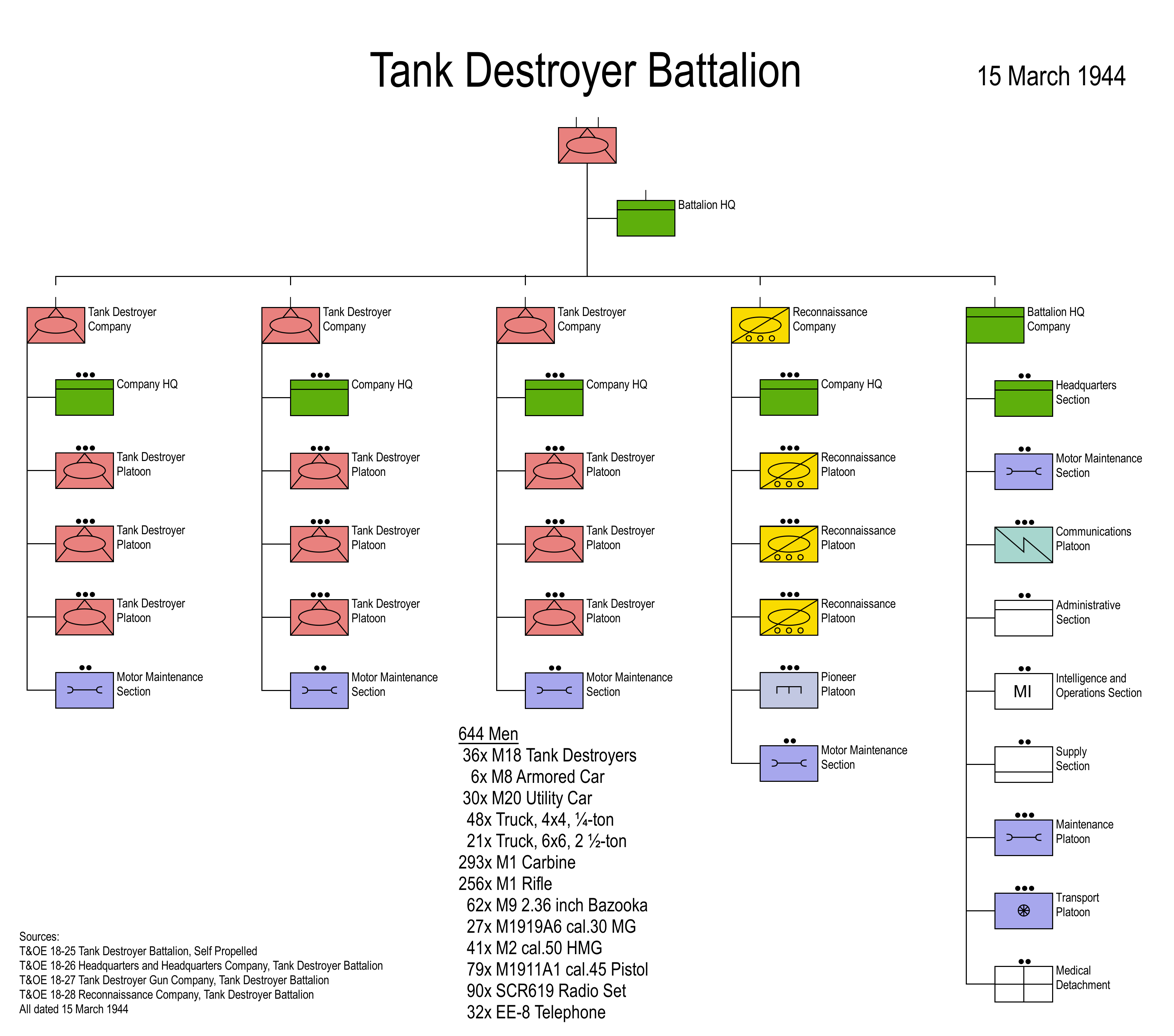
Tank Destroyer Battalion (SP) Structure - March 1944

On 17 January, holding positions at Oberwampach, east of Bastogne, the battalion destroyed a large number of vehicles from the 1st SS Panzer Division; at the end of the day, the battalion's total number of tank kills for the war stood at 102, making them the first tank destroyer battalion to knock out more than a hundred tanks.

On 26 January the battalion moved to Biwisch, crossing the Our River into Germany on the 30th and fighting through the Siegfried Line. It pushed east through February and March, and on 14 March crossed the Moselle for the fourth time, opening a bridgehead for the 4th Armored Division. On 16 March, the battalion reached the Rhine River at its confluence with the Moselle near Koblenz.

The battalion crossed the Rhine on 23 March, near Oppenheim, and captured Darmstadt on the 25th. It pushed north-east towards the River Main, and followed behind the 4th Armored Division clearing up small pockets of resistance which had been bypassed. On 1 April, it arrived in Bad Hersfeld and moved east towards the Czech border; a company was left in Merkers to provide security for the salt mine there, which contained the German financial reserves – a hundred tons of gold, as well as a large amount of looted artwork.

Elements of the battalion entered Czechoslovakia on 18 April, the first American troops to reach the country, and the battalion pushed south along the border, protecting the left flank of XII Corps as it moved into southern Germany. The battalion ended the war just inside Czechoslovakia, and on 14 May withdrew to Tirschenreuth in Bavaria, to take up occupation duties.

By the end of hostilities, the battalion had seen 254 days of combat, and taken 356 casualties. It had destroyed 138 tanks and self-propelled guns, as well as over a hundred pillboxes, and taken almost 2,000 prisoners of war.

In the early 21st century, the unit exists as the redesignated 773rd Military Police Bn. Louisiana Army National Guard.
