= 225th Engineer Brigade (United States) =

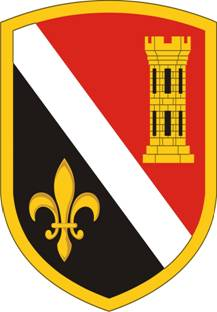
- 225th Engineer Brigade Shoulder Sleeve Insignia
- Country: United States
- Branch: United States Army National Guard
- Type: Engineer
- Role: Combat Support
- Size: Brigade
- Part of: Louisiana Army National Guard
- Garrison/HQ: Camp Beauregard, Louisiana (Headquarters)
- Motto: Confectio

Insignia
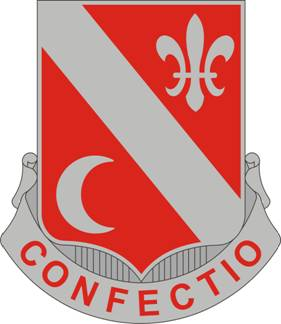
- Distinctive unit insignia

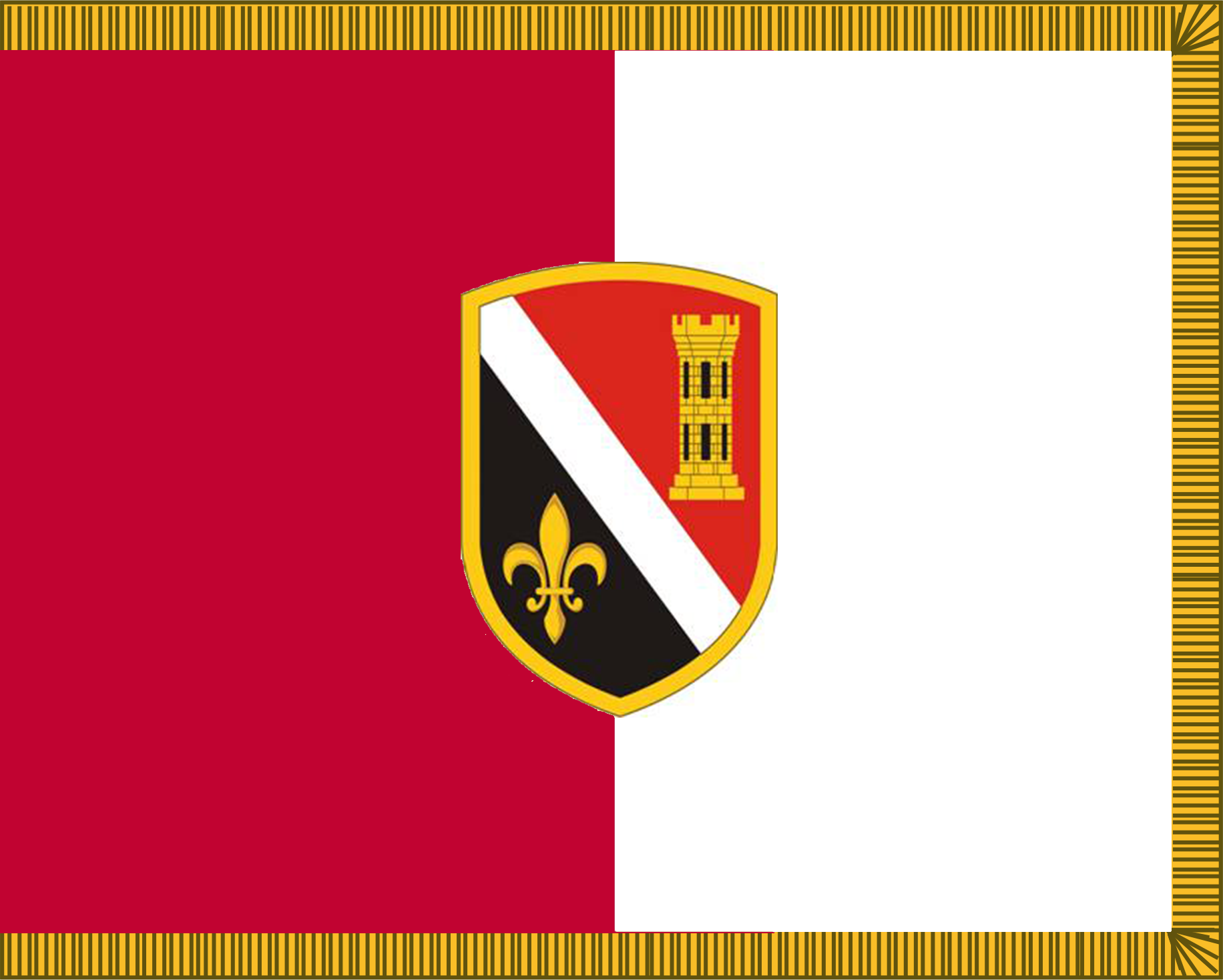
- 225th Engineer Brigade Flag

The 225th Engineer Brigade is a combat heavy engineer brigade of the Louisiana Army National Guard. It is one of the largest engineer formations in the United States Army National Guard. The 225th Engineer Brigade is headquartered at Camp Beauregard near Pineville, Louisiana in Rapides Parish. The brigade conducts missions of mobility, counter-mobility, survivability, and civil engineering support. The brigade possesses a mixture of civil and combat engineer units to accomplish these missions.

== History ==
In 1990 the 769th Engineer Battalion participated in the "Fuertes Caminos", a low intensity conflict from 6 January to 7 July 1990. During Operation Beyond the Horizons 2008, the 225th Engineer Brigade will provide construction support to humanitarian assistance missions in Honduras.

The 769th Engineer Battalion participated in "Operation Minuteman" in 1990 by constructing a 12 km road in rural Panama. This battalion also repaired schools, churches, and medical facilities during this operation.

The brigade has deployed battalion and company sized elements to Afghanistan and Iraq during the "Global War on Terror" since 2001. In Afghanistan elements of the 769th Engineer Battalion served as part of Task Force Dragon and Task Force Panther under the 505th Infantry Regiment around Bagram Air Base.

The brigade was activated and deployed in support to the New Orleans area after Hurricane Katrina. Hundreds of soldiers from the 225th Engineer Brigade served on Joint Task Force Gator, which provided law enforcement support to New Orleans from summer 2006 to 28 February 2009.

In 2007, the 225th served as the headquarters and construction element for Operation New Horizons 2007. During this mission four construction projects consisting of two-classrooms were built at four different schools within the nation of Belize in Central America. These projects where at Carmelita; Crooked Tree, Hattieville and Trial Farm. In addition to these construction mission medical, dental, and veterinary services were provide for several thousand Belizeans at Orange Walk, Burrel Boom and Ladyville. In earlier New Horizons operations, the brigade constructed buildings at Price Barracks, a military installation outside of Ladyville shared by the British Army and the Belize Defence Force in 2000 and a school at Guadalupe in 1997.

On July 14, 2008, HSC and FSC of the 769th Engineer Battalion (combat) returned after a year in Iraq. The units mobilized and demobilized from Fort McCoy, Wisconsin. The 927th Sapper Company of the 769th Engineer Battalion (combat) deployed to serve a year in Afghanistan from February 2008 to March 2009.

In August 2008, the 225th Engineer Brigade mobilized in preparation for Hurricane Gustav. The brigade conducted operations alongside units from several states such as: 203rd Engineer Battalion Missouri, 216th Engineer Battalion Ohio, 224th Engineer Battalion Iowa, and also units of infantry and military police from Kentucky, Tennessee, and Nebraska. The 769th Engineer Battalion operated in the following parishes: East Baton Rouge Parish, Ascension, Assumption, and Iberville. The brigade continued operations through September 2008.

In May 2010, members of the 2225th Multi-Role Bridging Company, which is part of the 225th and located at Camp Villere in Slidell, Louisiana, built and operated floating bridges to help support the cleanup efforts of the Deepwater Horizon Oil Spill in the Gulf of Mexico.

In September 2017, members of the 922nd Engineer Company, 528 Engineer Battalion, were deployed to Puerto Rico to assist in recovery efforts in response to Hurricane Maria. The unit's main tasks were road clearance using heavy machinery and food/water/medical supply distribution.

== Organization ==
The 225th Engineer Brigade consists of a headquarters company and four combat heavy engineer battalions:

225th Engineer Brigade (CASTLE)

- Headquarters and Headquarters Company (HHC) at Camp Beauregard, LA

205th Engineer Battalion

- HHC at Bogalusa, LA in Washington Parish
- 1021st Engineer Company (Vertical) at Covington, LA
- 843rd Engineer Company
- 2225th Engineer Company (Multi-Role Bridge) at Marrero, LA
- Forward Support Company

527th Engineer Battalion (Triple Alpha) ("Anything, Anytime, Anywhere")

- HHC at Lincoln Parish
- 844th Engineer Company (Horizontal) at Camp Beauregard
- 1020th Engineer Company (Vertical) at Marksville, LA in Avoyelles Parish
- 1022nd Engineer Company (Vertical) at West Monroe, LA in Ouachita Parish
- Forward Support Company at Ruston, LA

528th Engineer Battalion (To The Very End)

- Headquarters and Service Company at Monroe, LA in Ouachita Parish
- Forward Support Company at Monroe, LA
- 922nd Engineer Company (Vertical) at Gonzales, Louisiana in Ascension Parish
- 830th Engineer Team (Concrete) at Monroe, LA
- 832nd Engineer Team (Asphalt) at Plaquemine, LA
- 921st Engineer Company (Horizontal) at Winnsboro, LA in Franklin Parish
- 1023rd Engineer Company (Vertical) at Bastrop, LA in Morehouse Parish

== See also ==
- 256th Infantry Brigade
- Louisiana Army National Guard
