= Ligo de Seksemdiversaj Geesperantistoj =

Ligo de Seksemdiversaj Geesperantistoj (LSG) is a community and activist group for LGBT+ (lesbians, gays, bisexuals, trans people and others) people in Esperanto.

LSG was founded by Peter Danning in December 1977 under the name Ligo de Samseksamaj Geesperantistoj and is one of the oldest international LGBT organization in the world. Since 1990 it has had a cooperation agreement with the Universal Esperanto Association.

Since March 1978, LSG has published the bulletin Forumo, and also organizes accommodation services and holds events around Esperanto congresses. The current president is John Dumas, elected at the 107th World Esperanto Conference in Montreal.

In July 2024, the LSG membership approved a name change to Ligo de Seksemdiversaj Geesperantistoj.

== Objectives ==
The group has the following objectives:

- To create international solidarity and cooperation among its members, thus also supporting their activities for the spread of Esperanto and for the full integration of the diverse sexual orientations and gender identities in society.
- To work for the elimination of linguistic discrimination, informing about the language problem and its solution through Esperanto in LGBT+ environments.
- To work for the elimination of anti-LGBT+ discrimination, informing about the meaning, value and problems of LGBT diversities in Esperanto environments.
