= Joint Task Force Gator =

- Active: September 1, 2005 to February 28, 2009
- Country: United States
- Branch: Louisiana National Guard
- Type: Joint Task Force
- Role: Law Enforcement Support
- Size: Task Force
- Garrison/HQ: Holiday Inn New Orleans Downtown Superdome hotel, Louisiana (Headquarters)
- Mascot(s): Alligator

Joint Task Force Gator was a Joint Task Force of the Louisiana National Guard mobilized to provide command and control for state military assets deployed in support of New Orleans Law Enforcement for rescue efforts after Hurricane Katrina. The Joint Task Force operated in New Orleans, Louisiana from September 1, 2005 to February 28, 2009.

On August 29, 2005, Hurricane Katrina struck the gulf coast of Louisiana and Mississippi. Following the storm, carjacking, looting, and violent crimes began. 76,000 people were moved to Red Cross shelters and the mayor of New Orleans, Ray Nagin, demanded help for the 55,000 people that did not evacuate.

On June 16, 2006, the mayor submitted a request to the Governor, Kathleen Blanco, for 300 National Guardsmen and 60 state troopers to provide additional security assistance. On June 20, the first 100 soldiers arrived at the downtown headquarters while task force commander Colonel Stephen Dabadie began work on a plan to integrate 200 more soldiers. The task force reached 300 strong by June 22.

With the help of the Louisiana State Police, those initial National Guard efforts transitioned into a support mission for the New Orleans Police Department. Joint Task Force Gator helped combat the rise of looting and other crimes due to the loss of law enforcement officers in the New Orleans area. The Joint Task Force assisted the New Orleans Police Department for three and a half years before it was released from duty on February 28, 2009.

== See also ==
- Hurricane Katrina
- Hurricane Rita
- Hurricane Katrina disaster relief
