= 199th Infantry Regiment (United States) =

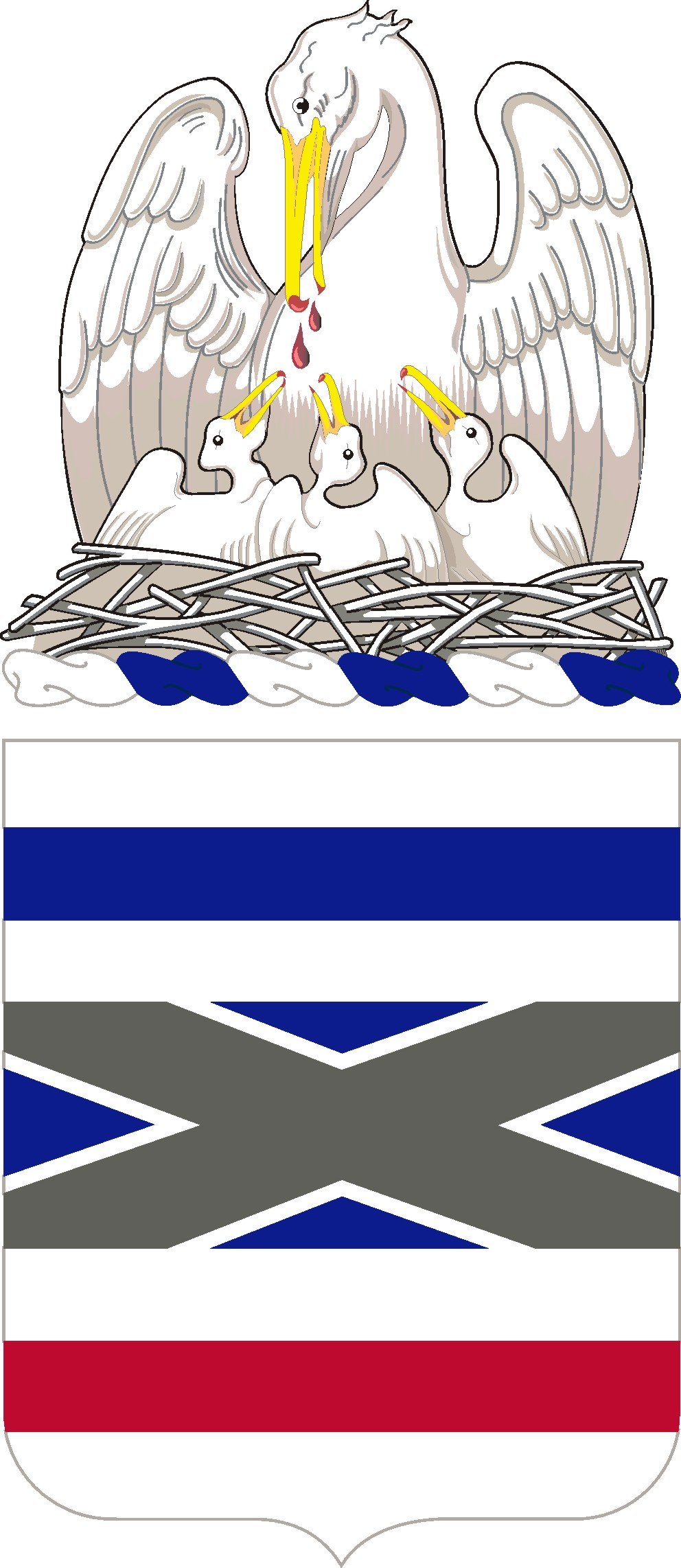
- 199th Infantry
- Active: 1952-1960. 1997-present.
- Country: United States of America
- Allegiance: Louisiana
- Branch: Army National Guard
- Type: Regional Training Institute
- Garrison/HQ: Louisiana National Guard Training Center Pineville
- Mottos: NOUS SOMMES PRETS (We Are Ready)

The 199th Infantry Regiment is a regiment of the United States Army, Louisiana Army National Guard. They are no longer a maneuver element. The 199th Infantry Regiment was formed on 1 May 1952 and served the state of Louisiana until 4 August 1960. The regiment was reactivated on 3 July 1997 as the 199th Regiment, in order to serve as part of the Louisiana National Guard.
