= Louisiana State Guard =

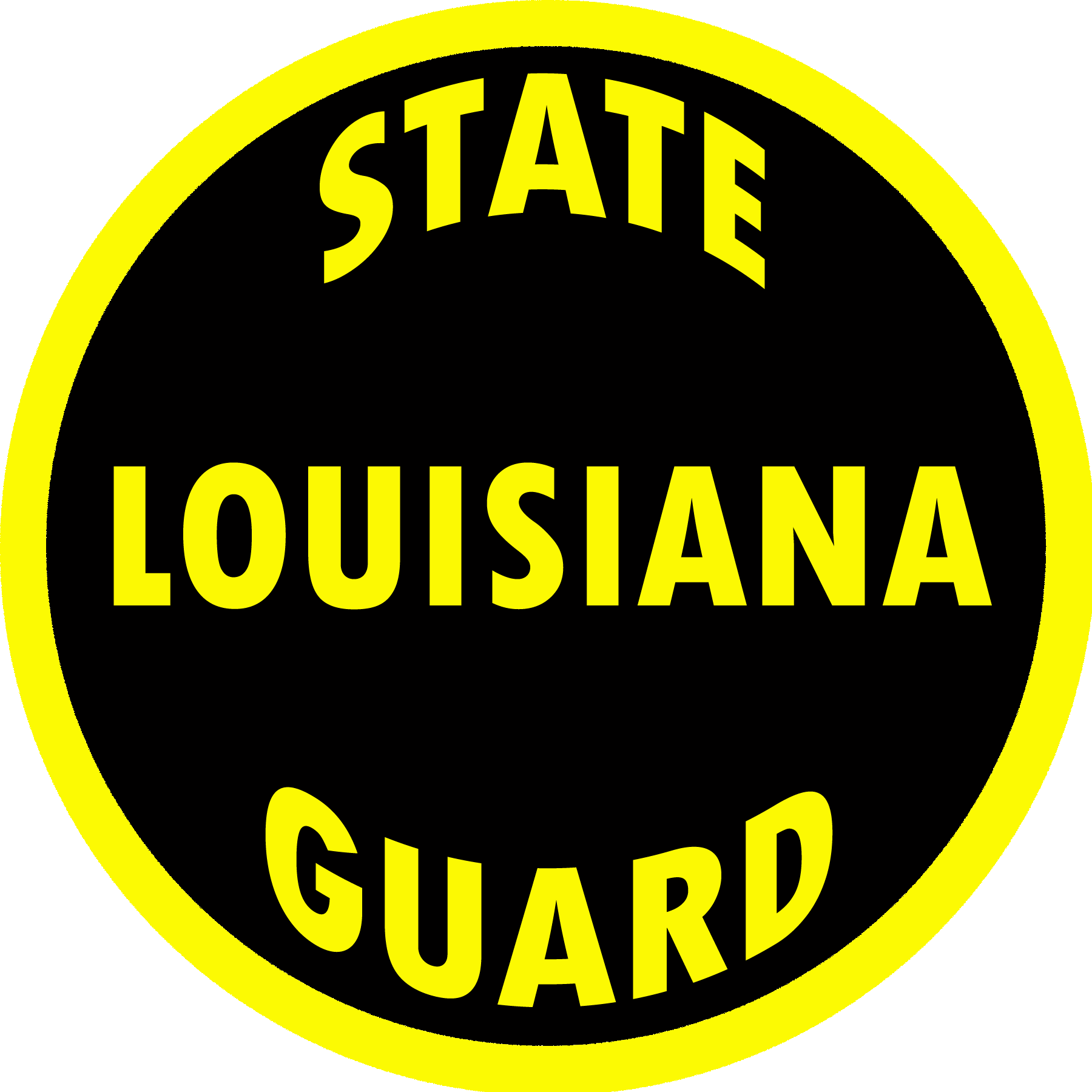
- The Louisiana State Guard insignia
- Active: 1942 – present
- Country: United States
- Allegiance: Louisiana
- Type: State defense force
- Role: Military reserve force
- Website: LASG Official Website

Commanders
- Civilian leadership: Governor Jeff Landry
- Military leadership: Brigadier General Larry Benton

The Louisiana State Guard (LSG; French: Garde de L'État de Louisiane; Spanish: Guardia Estatal de Luisiana) is the official state defense force of the state of Louisiana. The LSG was first created during World War II. As a state defense force, the LSG is a part of the state militia of Louisiana, and can serve as a stateside replacement of the Louisiana National Guard while the National Guard is deployed. Unlike the Louisiana National Guard, the Louisiana State Guard is solely under state control, and cannot be federalized or deployed outside of Louisiana, guaranteeing additional soldiers will always be available to the governor to deploy in response to crises.

== History of predecessor units ==
Both the National Guard and the state defense forces are descended from the state militias which augmented the relatively smaller professional federal military in times of war. During the War of 1812, numerous Louisiana militia units were raised to aid in the defense of the city during the Battle of New Orleans. Later, in the American Civil War, both Union units and Confederate units volunteered to fight. After the passage of the Militia Act of 1903, state militias were placed under federal control and reorganized as the modern National Guard of the United States, meaning that states who wished to provide a military response to man-made or natural disasters, insurrections, or military invasions while the National Guard was federalized had to raise their own state defense forces to replace these National Guard units.

== World War II ==
The Louisiana State Guard was authorized by the Louisiana State Legislature in 1942 by a vote of 85–5 in favor of creating the state militia. Unlike other state guards, who were organized and trained around the possibility of repelling an invasion, the Louisiana State Guard was created with the intent to primarily take over civil defense responsibilities such as evacuating civilians during an attack or arresting saboteurs. However, it was not organized until March 1943, due largely to the difficulty of recruiting members when most able-bodied men were being drafted into the federal military. By October 1943, the Louisiana State Guard had reached a strength of nearly 3,000 guardsmen.

=== Equipment ===
The War Department agreed to equip state defense forces, though often with outdated equipment. Louisiana was provided with reconditioned military trucks and cars, and obsolete uniforms and weapons, including sixty machine guns.

=== Plaquemines Parish incident ===
In October 1943, Louisiana Governor Sam Jones attempted to fill a vacancy for the position of sheriff in the Plaquemines Parish. Simultaneously, Leander H. Perez, an Assistant District Attorney and Democratic political boss of Plaquemines and St. Bernard parishes, attempted to fill the position through a special election. ADA Perez raised a local militia of deputies and armed citizens and fortified the town in order to prevent Governor Jones’ appointee from taking office, and Governor Jones moved several State Guard units closer to the parish after a supreme court ruling affirmed the Governor's right to make the appointment. On October 9, the Governor declared martial law and ordered the State Guard to advance into the parish. Guardsmen in armored cars entered the parish and ended the crisis without meeting any resistance.

== Disbandment ==
The Louisiana State Guard was disbanded on June 30, 1947.

== Later reactivation ==
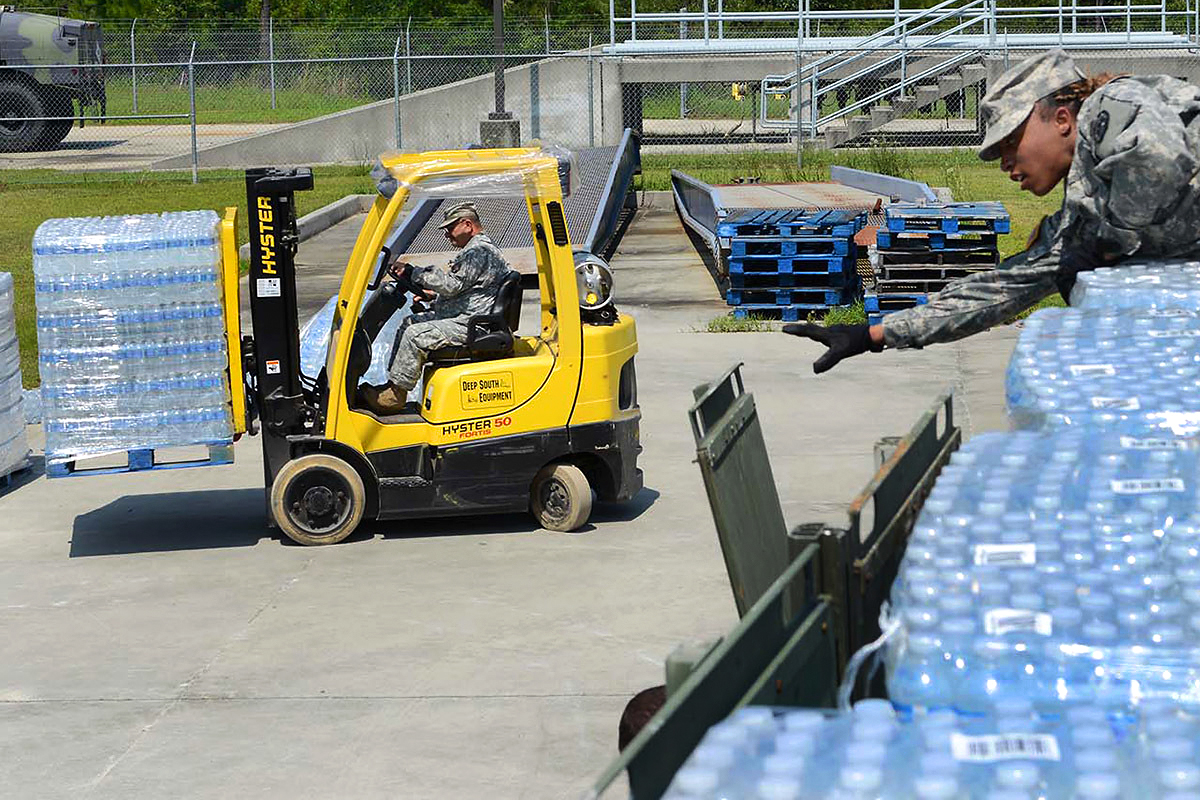
Louisiana National and State Guardsmen at Camp Villere in Slidell, La.

Louisiana later began rebuilding the Louisiana State Guard to a cadre-level organization throughout the 1980s. As of 2003, the Louisiana State Guard was organized as teams of soldiers and desk officers, trained as experts in operations and logistics, and organized for deployment to each parish (county) emergency operations center during a crisis. The Guard contains a pool of retired military personnel that can be called back to active duty if needed. Key Louisiana state employees are also members of the force so they can be mobilized more effectively in order to deal with emergencies.

All units of the Louisiana State Guard were deployed in support of the Louisiana National Guard in 2005 in the aftermath of Hurricane Katrina. The LSG was deployed to assist in recovery operations after Hurricane Francine in 2024.

As of 2024, the LSG performs emergency management assistance, including warehouse logistics, POD site operations, cyber defense and sUAS missions, as well as chaplain services.

== Legal basis ==
The Louisiana State Guard is authorized under Louisiana state law under Title 29 §5 of the Louisiana Revised Statutes. State defense forces are also authorized by the federal government under Title 32, Section 109 of the United States Code.

== Legal protection ==
Employers in the state of Louisiana are required by law to grant a leave of absence to any employees who are members of the Louisiana State Guard who are activated for any military service, and to restore those employees to their previous positions upon their return from their deployment.

== See also ==
- Louisiana Naval Militia
- Louisiana Wing Civil Air Patrol
