= 244th Aviation Regiment =

- Country: United States
- Branch: United States Army Aviation Branch
- Type: Aviation
- Part of: Louisiana Army National Guard

Aircraft flown
- Utility helicopter: UH-60M Black Hawk

The 244th Aviation Regiment is an aviation regiment of the U.S. Army.

== Structure ==
- 1st Battalion (Assault) at Army Aviation Support Facility #1 at Hammond Northshore Regional Airport
  - Company A (UH-60M)
- 2nd Battalion (General Support) at Army Aviation Support Facility #2 at Esler Airfield
  - Company F
