= 1st Battalion =

1st Battalion may refer to:

== Australia ==
- 1st Battalion (Australia)
- 1st Battalion, Australian Naval and Military Expeditionary Force
- 1st Battalion, Royal Australian Regiment
- 1st Anzac Entrenching Battalion
- 1st Cyclist Battalion
- 1st Health Battalion
- 1st Intelligence Battalion (Australia)
- 1st Machine Gun Battalion (Australia)
- 1st New Guinea Infantry Battalion
- 1st Parachute Battalion (Australia)
- 1st Pioneer Battalion (Australia)
- 1st Recruit Training Battalion (Australia)
- 1st Tank Battalion (Australia)
- 2/1st Battalion (Australia)
- 2/1st Pioneer Battalion
- 2/1st Machine Gun Battalion

== Belgium ==
- 1st Fusilier Battalion
- 1st Paratroopers Battalion (Belgium)

== Brazil ==
- 1st Chemical, Biological, Radiological and Nuclear Defense Battalion
- 1st Commando Actions Battalion
- 1st Special Forces Battalion

== Canada ==
- 1st Battalion (Ontario Regiment), CEF
- 1st Battalion, Canadian Mounted Rifles (Boer War)
- 1st Battalion, Canadian Mounted Rifles, CEF
- 1st Battalion, The Lake Superior Regiment
- 1st Battalion Governor General's Foot Guards
- 1st Battalion "Prince of Wales' Regiment Fusiliers"
- 1st Canadian Parachute Battalion
- 1st Canadian Rifle Battalion
- 1st Canadian Special Service Battalion
- 1st Infantry Division Support Battalion (The Saskatoon Light Infantry)

== Croatia ==
- 1st Armoured-Mechanized Battalion "Sokolovi"
- 1st Home Guard Battalion Pula

== France ==
- 1st Battalion of Somali Tirailleurs
- 1st Colonial Infantry Battalion
- 1st Foreign Parachute Battalion
- 1st Laotian Parachute Battalion
- 1st Vietnamese Parachute Battalion
- First National Battalion of Guiana

== (British) India ==
- 1st Battalion, 16th Bengal Native Infantry
- 1st Battalion, 22nd Bengal Native Infantry
- 1st Battalion, 24th Bengal Native Infantry
- 1st Battalion, 30th Bengal Native Infantry
- 1st Battalion, 33rd Bengal Native Infantry
- 1st Battalion, 4th Madras Native Infantry
- 1st Battalion, 12th Madras Native Infantry
- 1st Battalion, 17th Madras Native Infantry
- 1st Battalion Bombay Sepoys
- 1st Battalion Coast Sepoys

== Italy ==
- 1st Bersaglieri Battalion "La Marmora"
- 1st Grenadiers Battalion "Assietta"
- 1st Lagunari Battalion "Serenissima"
- 1st Miners Battalion "Garda"
- 1st NBC Battalion "Etruria"
- 1st Pontieri Engineer Battalion
- 1st Royal Carabinieri Paratroopers Battalion
- 1st Tank Battalion "M.O. Cracco"
- 1st Transport Battalion "Monviso"

== Pakistan ==
- 1st Battalion, Azad Kashmir Regiment
- 1st Battalion, Sindh Regiment
- 1st Battalion, The Frontier Force Regiment

== Romania ==
- 1st CIMIC Battalion
- 1st Special Operations Battalion

== Ukraine ==
- 1st Independent Motorized Infantry Battalion
- 1st Marine Battalion (Ukraine)
- 1st Nuclear Power Plant Protection Battalion
- 1st Serhii Kulchytskyi Battalion

== United Kingdom ==
- 1st Battalion, 1st Regiment of Foot
- 1st Battalion, Argyll and Sutherland Highlanders
- 1st Battalion, Black Watch
- 1st Battalion, Coldstream Guards
- 1st Battalion, The Duke of Lancaster's Regiment
- 1st Battalion, East Riding Local Militia
- 1st Battalion, Grenadier Guards
- 1st Battalion, Irish Guards
- 1st Battalion, London Rifle Brigade, The Rifle Brigade
- 1st Battalion, Loyal Brecknock Volunteers
- 1st Battalion, The Mercian Regiment
- 1st Battalion, Mercian Volunteers
- 1st Battalion, Parachute Regiment
- 1st Battalion, Princess of Wales's Royal Regiment
- 1st Battalion, The Rangers, KRRC
- 1st Battalion, The Rifles
- 1st Battalion, The Royal Anglian Regiment 'The Vikings'
- 1st Battalion, Royal Gurkha Rifles
- 1st Battalion, Royal Irish Regiment
- 1st Battalion, Royal Regiment of Fusiliers
- 1st Battalion, Royal Regiment of Scotland
- 1st Battalion, The Scots Guards
- 1st Battalion, Sherwood Foresters
- 1st Battalion, Staffordshire Regiment
- 1st Battalion, Tower Hamlets Rifles
- 1st Battalion, Ulster Defence Regiment
- 1st Battalion, Welsh Guards
- 1st Battalion, Wessex Volunteers
- 1st Battalion, York and Lancaster Regiment
- 1st Battalion, The Yorkshire Regiment
- 1st/9th Battalion, Ulster Defence Regiment
- 1st/19th Battalion, Royal New South Wales Regiment
- 1st Administrative Battalion, Carnarvonshire Rifle Volunteers
- 1st Administrative Battalion, Cinque Ports Rifle Volunteer Corps
- 1st Administrative Battalion, Gloucestershire Engineer Volunteers
- 1st Administrative Battalion, Gloucestershire Rifle Volunteer Corps
- 1st Administrative Battalion, Isle of Wight Rifle Volunteers
- 1st Administrative Battalion, Leicestershire Rifle Volunteer Corps
- 1st Administrative Battalion, Linlithgowshire Rifle Volunteers
- 1st Administrative Battalion, Middlesex Artillery Volunteers
- 1st Administrative Battalion, Montgomeryshire Rifle Volunteer Corps
- 1st Administrative Battalion, Sussex Rifle Volunteer Corps
- 1st Administrative Battalion, Tower Hamlets Rifle Volunteer Corps
- 1st Anti-Aircraft Battalion, Royal Engineers
- 1st Bengal European Battalion
- 1st Cadet Battalion, East Surrey Regiment
- 1st Cadet Battalion, Queen's (Royal West Surrey Regiment)
- 1st Field Battalion, Royal Engineers
- 1st Garrison Battalion, Essex Regiment
- 1st Gwent Battalion
- 1st Provisional Battalion (United Kingdom)
- 1st Royal Veteran Battalion
- 1st Volunteer Battalion, King's (Liverpool Regiment)
- 1st Volunteer Battalion, Loyal North Lancashire Regiment
- 1st Volunteer Battalion, Manchester Regiment
- 1st Volunteer Battalion, Northamptonshire Regiment
- 1st Volunteer Battalion, North Staffordshire Regiment
- 1st Volunteer Battalion, Royal Warwickshire Regiment
- 1st Volunteer Battalion, South Staffordshire Regiment
- 1st Volunteer Battalion, The Queen's (Royal West Surrey Regiment)
- 1st Volunteer Battalion, Worcestershire Regiment
- 1st Brecknockshire Volunteer Battalion, South Wales Borderers
- 1st (City of Bristol) Volunteer Battalion, Gloucestershire Regiment
- 1st (City of London) Battalion, London Regiment (Royal Fusiliers)
- 1st (Exeter and South Devon) Volunteer Battalion, Devonshire Regiment
- 1st (Hallamshire) Volunteer Battalion
- 1st (Consolidated) Battalion, East Yorkshire Rifle Volunteers
- 1st (Home Service) Battalion, Dorset Regiment

== United States ==
=== Confederate States Army ===
- 1st Confederate Infantry Battalion
- 1st Battalion, Arkansas State Troops
- 1st Battalion, Mississippi Sharpshooters
- 1st Arkansas Cavalry Battalion
- 1st Arkansas Cavalry Battalion (Borland's)
- 1st Arkansas Infantry Battalion (Confederate)
- 1st Florida Special Cavalry Battalion
- 1st Georgia Cavalry Battalion
- 1st Georgia Sharpshooter Battalion
- 1st Louisiana Infantry Battalion
- 1st Maryland Cavalry Battalion (Confederate)
- 1st Virginia Infantry Battalion

=== Union Army ===
- 1st Arkansas Infantry Battalion
- 1st California Cavalry Battalion
- 1st California Mountaineers Battalion
- 1st California Veteran Infantry Battalion
- 1st Dakota Cavalry Battalion
- 1st Delaware Cavalry Battalion
- 1st Georgia Infantry Battalion
- Munday's 1st Battalion Kentucky Cavalry
- 1st Maine Infantry Battalion
- 1st Maine Sharpshooters Battalion
- 1st Maryland Cavalry Battalion, Potomac Home Brigade
- 1st Battalion Massachusetts Infantry
- 1st Massachusetts Heavy Artillery Battalion
- 1st Minnesota Infantry Battalion
- 1st Battalion, Mississippi Mounted Rifles
- 1st Missouri State Militia Infantry Battalion
- 1st Nebraska Veteran Cavalry Battalion
- 1st Nevada Cavalry Battalion
- 1st Nevada Infantry Battalion
- 1st New York Light Artillery Battalion
- 1st Battalion New York Volunteer Sharpshooters
- 1st Ohio Independent Cavalry Battalion
- 1st Ohio Sharpshooters Battalion

=== United States Army ===
- 1st Battalion, 1st Air Defense Artillery Regiment
- 1st Battalion, 37th Armor Regiment
- 1st Battalion, 66th Armor Regiment
- 1st Battalion, 67th Armor Regiment
- 1st Battalion, 68th Armor Regiment
- 1st Battalion, 77th Armor Regiment
- 1st Battalion, 145th Armor Regiment
- 1st Battalion, 150th Armor Regiment
- 1st Battalion, 252nd Armor Regiment
- 1st Battalion, 635th Armor Regiment
- 1st Battalion, 300th Armored Cavalry Regiment
- 1st Battalion, 2nd Aviation Regiment
- 1st Battalion, 10th Aviation Regiment
- 1st Battalion, 13th Aviation Regiment
- 1st Battalion, 101st Aviation Regiment
- 1st Battalion, 108th Aviation Regiment
- 1st Battalion, 111th Aviation Regiment
- 1st Battalion, 112th Aviation Regiment
- 1st Battalion, 114th Aviation Regiment
- 1st Battalion, 126th Aviation Regiment
- 1st Battalion, 130th Aviation Regiment
- 1st Battalion, 131st Aviation Regiment
- 1st Battalion, 135th Aviation Regiment
- 1st Battalion, 140th Aviation Regiment
- 1st Battalion, 147th Aviation Regiment
- 1st Battalion, 149th Aviation Regiment
- 1st Battalion, 150th Aviation Regiment
- 1st Battalion, 168th Aviation Regiment
- 1st Battalion, 171st Aviation Regiment
- 1st Battalion, 183rd Aviation Regiment
- 1st Battalion, 189th Aviation Regiment
- 1st Battalion, 207th Aviation Regiment
- 1st Battalion, 211th Aviation Regiment
- 1st Battalion, 224th Aviation Regiment
- 1st Battalion, 244th Aviation Regiment
- 1st Battalion, 285th Aviation Regiment
- 1st Battalion, 107th Cavalry Regiment
- 1st Battalion, 5th Field Artillery Regiment
- 1st Battalion, 6th Field Artillery Regiment
- 1st Battalion, 9th Field Artillery Regiment
- 1st Battalion, 21st Field Artillery Regiment
- 1st Battalion, 30th Field Artillery Regiment
- 1st Battalion, 41st Field Artillery Regiment
- 1st Battalion, 76th Field Artillery Regiment
- 1st Battalion, 79th Field Artillery Regiment
- 1st Battalion, 81st Field Artillery Regiment
- 1st Battalion, 83rd Field Artillery Regiment
- 1st Battalion, 102nd Field Artillery Regiment
- 1st Battalion, 111th Field Artillery Regiment
- 1st Battalion, 113th Field Artillery Regiment
- 1st Battalion, 119th Field Artillery Regiment
- 1st Battalion, 120th Field Artillery Regiment
- 1st Battalion, 161st Field Artillery Regiment
- 1st Battalion, 168th Field Artillery Regiment (Colorado National Guard)
- 1st Battalion, 168th Field Artillery Regiment (Nebraska National Guard)
- 1st Battalion, 194th Field Artillery Regiment
- 1st Battalion, 206th Field Artillery Regiment
- 1st Battalion, 258th Field Artillery Regiment
- 1st Battalion, 319th Field Artillery Regiment
- 1st Battalion, 320th Field Artillery Regiment
- 1st Battalion, 321st Field Artillery Regiment
- 1st Battalion, 377th Field Artillery Regiment
- 1st Battalion, 1st Infantry Regiment
- 1st Battalion, 9th Infantry Regiment
- 1st Battalion, 17th Infantry Regiment
- 1st Battalion, 26th Infantry Regiment
- 1st Battalion, 28th Infantry Regiment
- 1st Battalion, 30th Infantry Regiment
- 1st Battalion, 32nd Infantry Regiment
- 1st Battalion, 36th Infantry Regiment
- 1st Battalion, 48th Infantry Regiment
- 1st Battalion, 116th Infantry Regiment
- 1st Battalion, 120th Infantry Regiment
- 1st Battalion, 121st Infantry Regiment
- 1st Battalion, 148th Infantry Regiment
- 1st Battalion, 153rd Infantry Regiment
- 1st Battalion, 181st Infantry Regiment
- 1st Battalion, 355th Infantry Regiment
- 1st Battalion, 502nd Infantry Regiment
- 1st Battalion, 503rd Infantry Regiment
- 1st Battalion, 506th Infantry Regiment
- 1st Battalion, 508th Infantry Regiment
- 1st Battalion, 509th Infantry Regiment
- 1st Battalion, 20th Special Forces Group
- 1st Aviation Battalion
- 1st Engineer Battalion
- 1st Filipino Infantry Battalion
- 1st Military Intelligence Battalion

=== Marine Corps ===
- 1st Battalion, 1st Marines
- 1st Battalion, 2nd Marines
- 1st Battalion, 3rd Marines
- 1st Battalion, 4th Marines
- 1st Battalion, 5th Marines
- 1st Battalion, 6th Marines
- 1st Battalion, 7th Marines
- 1st Battalion, 8th Marines
- 1st Battalion, 9th Marines
- 1st Battalion, 10th Marines
- 1st Battalion, 11th Marines
- 1st Battalion, 12th Marines
- 1st Battalion, 14th Marines
- 1st Battalion, 15th Marines
- 1st Battalion, 19th Marines
- 1st Battalion, 20th Marines
- 1st Battalion, 23rd Marines
- 1st Battalion, 24th Marines
- 1st Battalion, 25th Marines
- 1st Battalion, 26th Marines
- 1st Battalion, 28th Marines
- 1st 75mm Antiaircraft Artillery Battalion
- 1st Airdrome Battalion
- 1st Amphibian Tractor Battalion
- 1st Antiaircraft Battalion
- 1st Anti-Aircraft Artillery (Automatic Weapons) Battalion
- 1st Armored Assault Battalion
- 1st Combat Engineer Battalion
- 1st Communication Support Battalion
- 1st Defense Battalion
- 1st Dental Battalion
- 1st Distribution Support Battalion
- 1st Intelligence Battalion (United States)
- 1st Light Armored Reconnaissance Battalion
- 1st Low Altitude Air Defense Battalion
- 1st Machine Gun Battalion (United States)
- 1st Maintenance Battalion
- 1st Marine Raider Battalion (MARSOC)
- 1st Marine Raider Battalion (Second World War)
- 1st Medical Battalion
- 1st Medium Antiaircraft Missile Battalion
- 1st Network Battalion
- 1st Parachute Battalion (United States)
- 1st Provisional Marine Guided Missile Battalion
- 1st Radio Battalion
- 1st Ranger Battalion
- 1st Reconnaissance Battalion
- 1st Recruit Training Battalion (United States)
- 1st Tank Battalion
- 1st Terrier Surface-to-Air Missile Battalion
- 1st Tracked Vehicle Battalion
- 1st Transportation Support Battalion

=== Other battalions ===
- 1st Battalion Flying Camp, American Revolution
- 1st Pennsylvania Battalion, American Revolution

== Other countries ==
- 1st Infantry Battalion (Albania)
- 1st Para-Commando Battalion, Bangladesh
- 1st Czechoslovak Independent Field Battalion
- 1st Danish Artillery Battalion
- 1st Lithuanian Construction Battalion, Nazi Germany
- 1st Parachute Battalion (Hungary)
- 1st Kenya Rifles Battalion
- 1st Infantry Battalion (KNIL), Netherlands
- 1st Northern Ski Battalion, Norway
- 1st Salinas Battalion, Philippines
- 1st Lithuanian Fusilier Reserve Battalion, Prussia
- 1st Russian Women's Battalion of Death
- 1 Parachute Battalion, South Africa
- Halland County First Infantry Battalion, Sweden

== Other uses ==
- First Battalion (video game), U.S. version of the 2006 video game Panzer Elite Action: Fields of Glory
- First Earth Battalion
- First Battalion Virginia Volunteers Armory, an armory in Richmond, Virginia

== See also ==
- First Army (disambiguation)
- I Corps (disambiguation)
- 1st Division (disambiguation)
- 1st Brigade (disambiguation)
- 1st Regiment (disambiguation)
- 1st Wing (disambiguation)
- 1st Squadron (disambiguation)
- 1st (disambiguation)
