= 1st Intelligence Battalion =

1st Intelligence Battalion may refer to:

- 1st Intelligence Battalion (Australia), Australian Army
- 1st Intelligence Battalion (United States), United States Marine Corps
- 1st Military Intelligence Battalion, United States Army

== See also ==
- 1st Battalion (disambiguation)
