= 36th Infantry Regiment (United States) =

36th Armored Infantry Regiment
- Coat of arms
- Founded: 1916; 110 years ago
- Country: United States
- Branch: United States Army
- Type: Infantry
- Nickname: Spartans
- Motto: "Deeds Not Words"
- Engagements: World War II; Iraq War; Global war on terrorism

Commanders
- Notable commanders: Walton Walker

Insignia
- Distinctive unit insignia

The 36th Infantry Regiment is a United States Army infantry regiment.

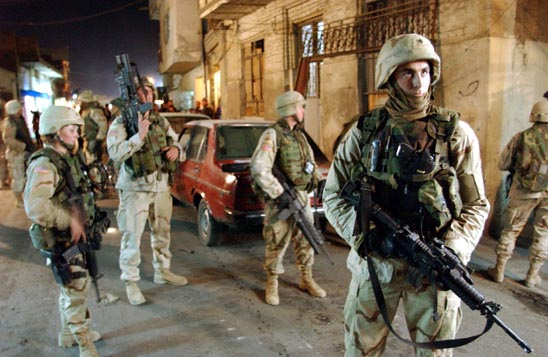
36th Infantry Regiment soldiers in November 2003

== History ==
=== World War I ===
The 36th Infantry was formed on 1 July 1916 at Brownsville, Texas from elements of the 4th Infantry, 26th Infantry and 28th Infantry. It was assigned to the 12th Division on 5 July 1918 and relieved from the 12th Division 31 January 1919.

=== Interwar period ===
The 36th Infantry was stationed at Camp Devens, Massachusetts, as of June 1919 as a separate regiment, and transferred by marching to Fort Jay, New York, arriving there on 13 October 1921. It was inactivated on 13 October 1921 at Fort Jay and the personnel were transferred to the 22nd Infantry Regiment; the 16th Infantry Regiment had previously been designated as "Active Associate" on 27 July 1921, and would provide the personnel from which the 36th Infantry would be reactivated in time of war. The 36th Infantry was allotted to the First Corps Area on 17 July 1922 for mobilization responsibility; concurrently, the 16th Infantry was relieved as Active Associate and the 5th Infantry Regiment was designated as Active Associate. The 36th Infantry was assigned to the 9th Division on 24 March 1923, and organized by September 1926 with Organized Reserve personnel as a "Regular Army Inactive" (RAI) unit in the First Corps Area at large. It was withdrawn from the First Corps Area on 28 February 1927 and allotted to the Second Corps Area. Concurrently, the 5th Infantry was relieved as Active Associate. The regimental headquarters was reorganized at New York City on 9 September 1927.

The regiment, less the 2nd and 3rd Battalions, was affiliated with the New York University ROTC program on 18 April 1930 and organized at New York City as an RAI unit with Regular Army personnel assigned to the ROTC detachment and Reserve officers commissioned from the program. Concurrently, the 2nd Battalion was affiliated with La Salle Military Academy at Oakdale, New York, and the 3rd Battalion was affiliated with Bordentown Military Institute at Bordentown, New Jersey. The regiment conducted summer training most years at Camp Dix, New Jersey. The designated mobilization training station for the regiment was Camp Dix. When the partially-inactive 9th Division was in the process of fully reactivating under the new "triangular" configuration, the 36th Infantry was relieved from the division on 1 July 1940, redesignated the 36th Infantry Regiment (Armored) on 15 April 1941, and assigned to the newly-activated 3rd Armored Division. The regiment was concurrently activated, less Reserve personnel, at Camp Beauregard, Louisiana. Reserve personnel previously assigned to the regiment were reassigned on 29 May 1941 to the 77th Division's 308th Infantry. The 36th Infantry was transferred on 13 June 1941 to Camp Polk, Louisiana.

=== World War II ===
On 1 July 1942 it was redesignated the 36th Armored Infantry Regiment. The regiment's first commander was Walton Walker. The regiment served with the 3rd Armored Division through World War II.

=== Modern ===
The 1st Battalion, 36th Infantry Regiment (Spartans), was reactivated at Ray Barracks, Germany, in 1996, having been reflagged from 3-5 CAV, which was stationed at nearby Kirchgöns. The battalion was assigned to the 1st Brigade, 1st Armored Division (Ready First Combat Team). The battalion participated in an 11-month rotation in Bosnia Implementation Force (IFOR), followed by a sixth month Stabilisation Force (SFOR) rotation ending in another six-month rotation as part of the Kosovo Force (KFOR) in 2000. The battalion was stationed at Camp Monteith. In May 2003, the Spartans deployed to central Baghdad, Iraq, for a fifteen-month mission in support of the Iraq War's Operation Iraqi Freedom. The battalion deployed to Iraq for a second time in 2006, where it provided security and stability to the city of Hit. The unit redeployed to Germany in February 2007.

The 1st Battalion of the 36th Infantry Regiment was reactivated on 16 September 2008 and assigned to the 1st Brigade Combat Team (currently 1st Armored Brigade Combat Team), 1st Armored Division. The motto is "Deeds Not Words!"

== Campaign participation credit ==
World War II

- Normandy
- Northern France
- Rhineland
- Ardennes-Alsace
- Central Europe

Iraq War

- Operation Iraqi Freedom

Global War on Terrorism

- Operartion Enduring Freedom
- Operation Freedom Sentinel

== Decorations ==
- Presidential Unit Citation for the Roer River Salient; Companies "A" and "C" of the First Battalion
- Presidential Unit Citation; First Battalion assault on the Siegfried Line
- Presidential Unit Citation; Medical Section 2nd Battalion Fromental France
- Presidential Unit Citation; Medical Section 3rd Battalion Stolberg, Germany
- Presidential Unit Citation, Siegfried Line; First Battalion
- Presidential Unit Citation, Echtz-Hoben; First Battalion
- Belgian Fourragère
- Presidential Unit Citation, Iraq; First Battalion (2004)
- Joint Meritorious Unit Award, Iraq; First Battalion (2004)
- Navy Unit Commendation, Al Anbar, Iraq; First Battalion (2007)
- Joint Meritorious Unit Award, Al Anbar, Iraq; First Battalion (2007)
- Meritorious Unit Commendation, Iraq; First Battalion (2010)
