= Parachutist Badge (Hungary) =

- 1940M Parachutist Badge
- Type: Military Badge
- Awarded for: Military Parachutist Proficiency
- Description: Comes in several versions
- Presented by: Hungary
- Eligibility: Soldiers of Hungarian Defence Forces and Allied nations
- Status: Currently awarded

The Hungarian Defense Forces award four classes of parachutist badges to personnel who are qualified as military parachutists. The current version has been awarded since 1990.

== History ==
=== 1940–1945 ===
The first official parachutist badges were introduced into the Royal Hungarian Army on February 14, 1940. Its design consisted of a parachute atop a pair of wings and a skull and two crossed fighting knives in the middle against green cloth. Two different badges were awarded: officers wore gold and noncommissioned officers and enlisted men had silver. The badge was worn above the right breast pocket. They measured 80 by 36 millimeters, and the parachutes themselves were 25 millimeters wide. Easily removable metal badges were introduced later during the war for combat uniforms because Hungarian paratroopers could face summary execution if captured by Soviet troops.

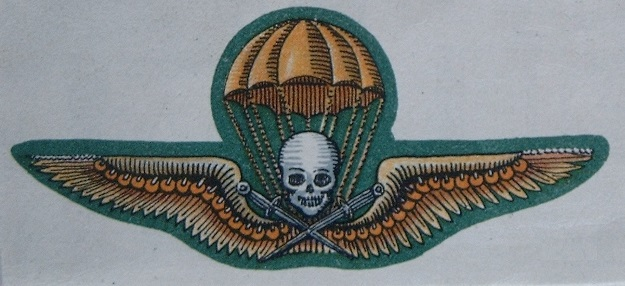
Royal Hungarian Army parachutist badge in gold for officers

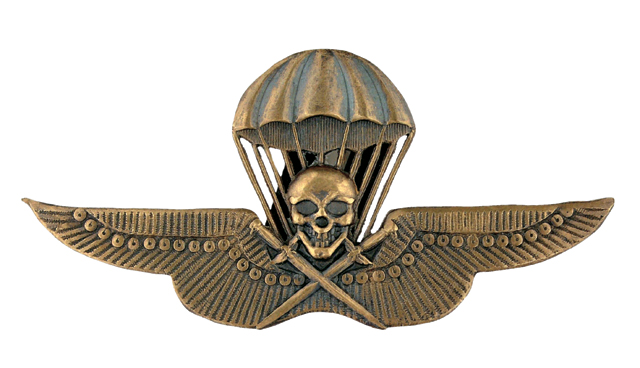
Royal Hungarian Army parachutist badge in bronze

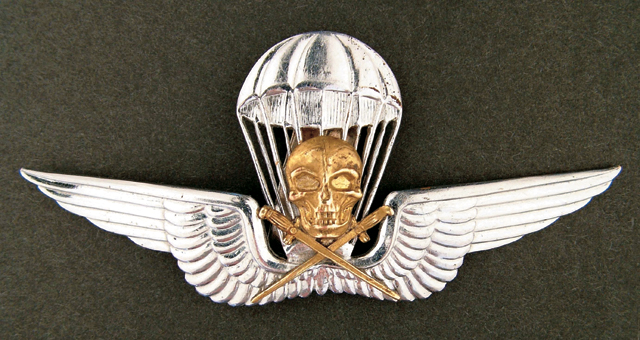
Royal Hungarian Army parachutist badge in silver

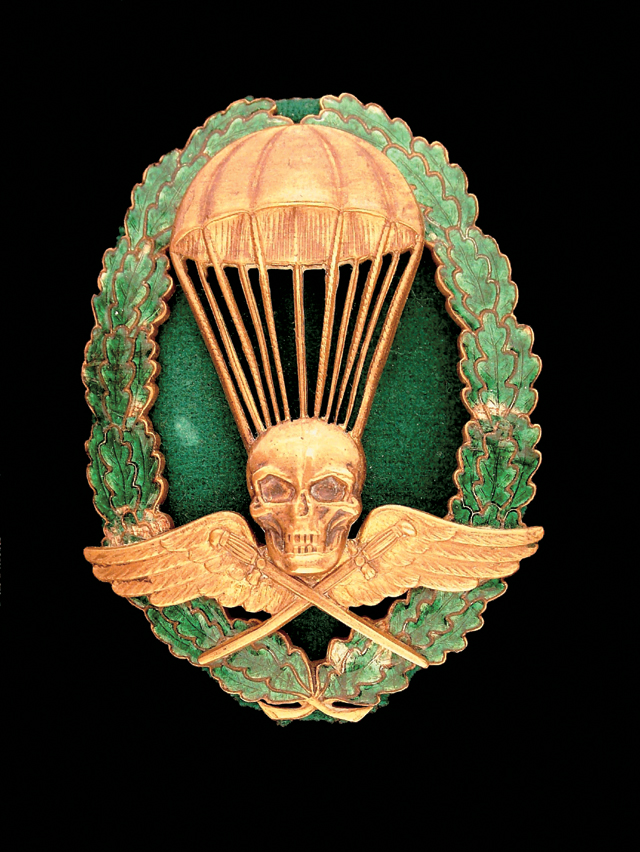
Royal Hungarian Army master parachutist skill badge

=== 1945–1989 ===
After the reformation of the Kingdom of Hungary into the Hungarian Republic, a new parachutist badge was created where the coat of arms of Hungary replaced the skull and crossed knives.

Later, following the establishment of the Hungarian People's Republic, new badges with Soviet-style red stars were introduced in 1950. It came in three classes: parachutist, master parachutist, and instructor.

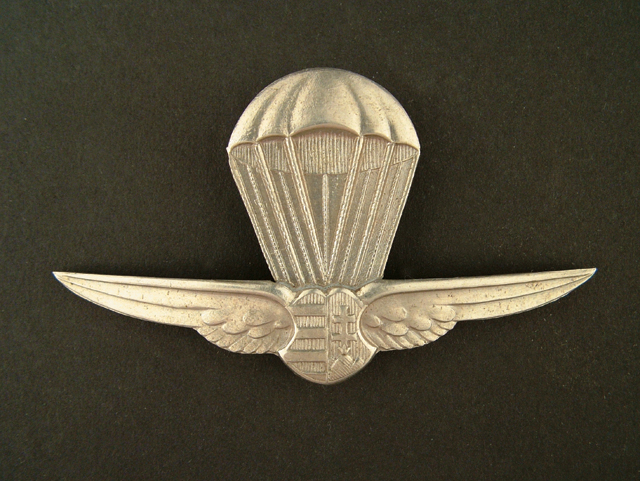
Postwar Hungarian parachutist badge (pre-1950)

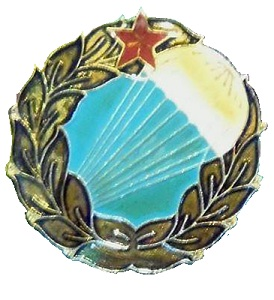
Hungarian People's Army parachutist badge, 1950s

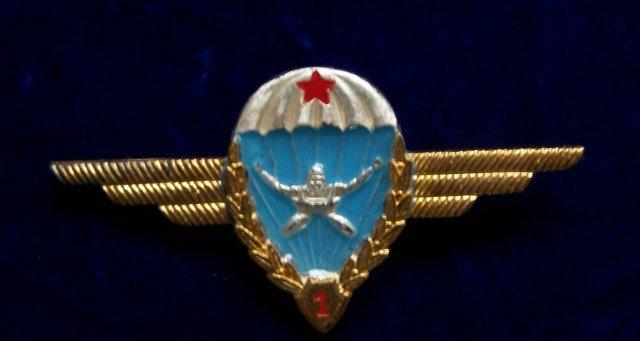
Hungarian People's Army Gold Laurel 1st Class parachutist badge, 1970s

=== After 1990 ===
With the fall of the Iron Curtain and the end of the Cold War, the Hungarian People's Army transitioned into the current Hungarian Defense Forces. The new military adopted some traditions from the Royal Hungarian Army and created new cloth parachutist badges and ratings in 1993. As with the Royal Hungarian Army, officers wear gold thread and warrant officers and noncommissioned officers silver. Enlisted soldiers—conscripts and volunteers alike and volunteers since 2004—wear bronze thread. The badges are worn on the left side of the uniform above any ribbons worn.

Since December 14, 2021, parachute-qualified personnel are permitted to wear an embroidered version of the 1940 skull and crossed knives badge again. It is formally called 1940/2021M Parachutist Badge.

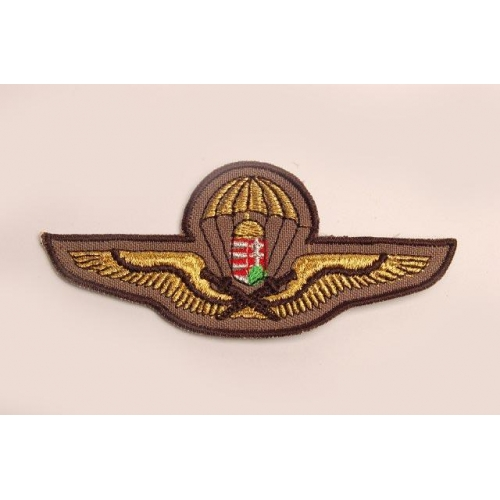
Parachute badge for officers

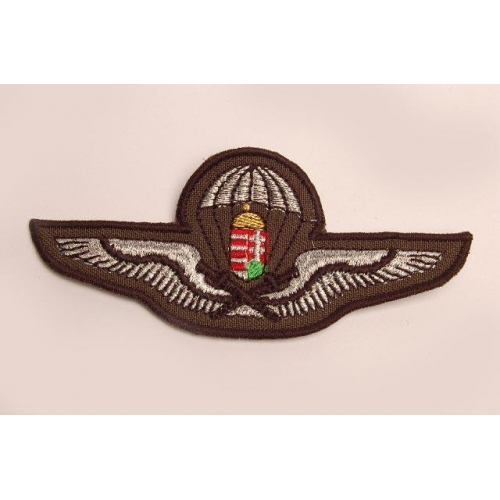
Parachute badge for warrant officers and noncommissioned officers

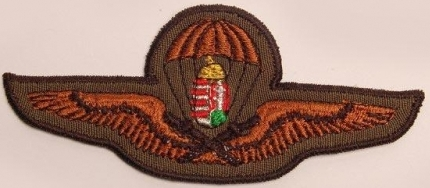
Parachute rating for enlisted personnel

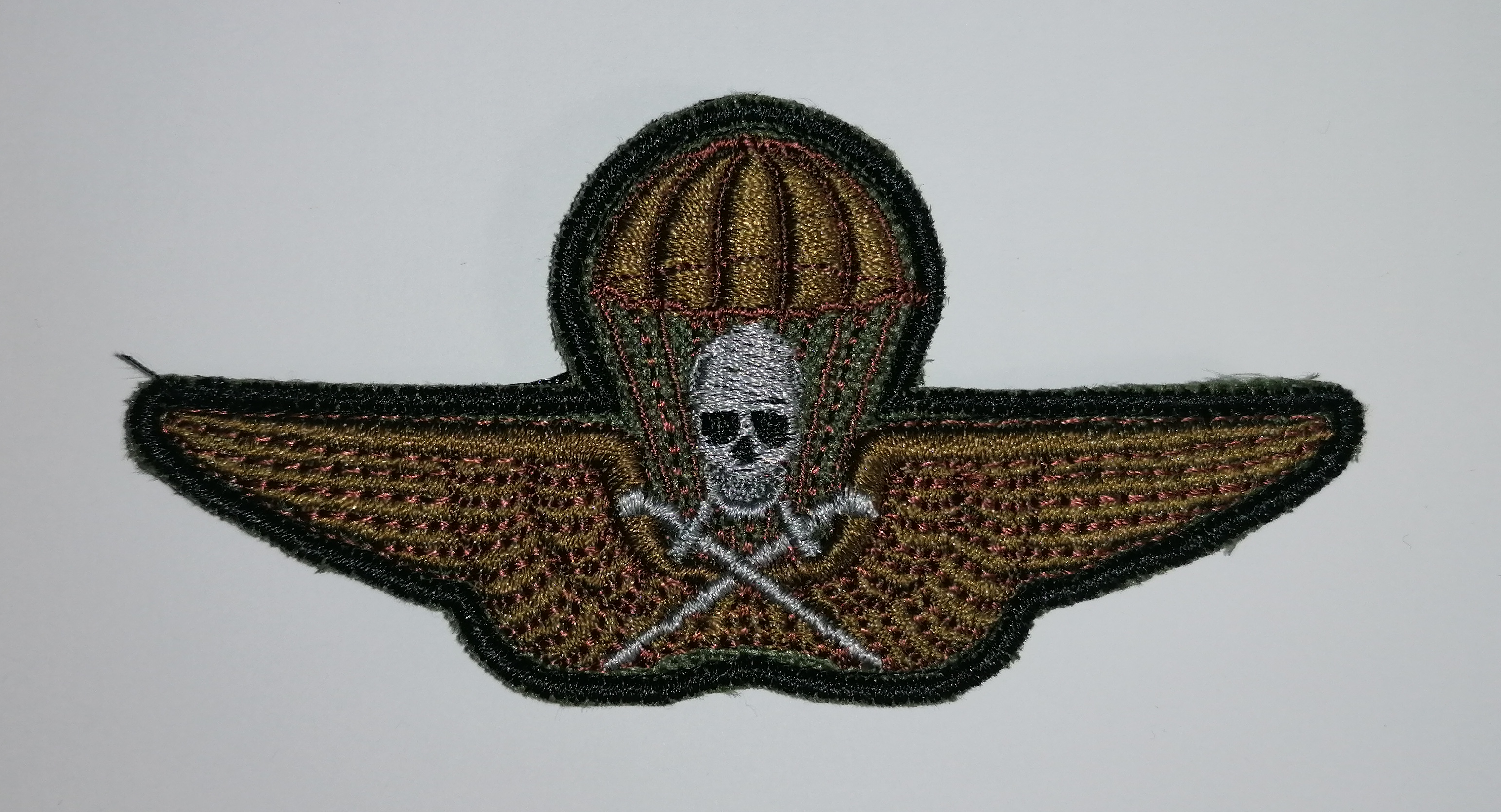
1940/2021M Embroidered parachutist badge

There are also four classes created of parachutist ratings:

- Gold Laurel 1st Class
- 1st Class
- 2nd Class
- 3rd Class

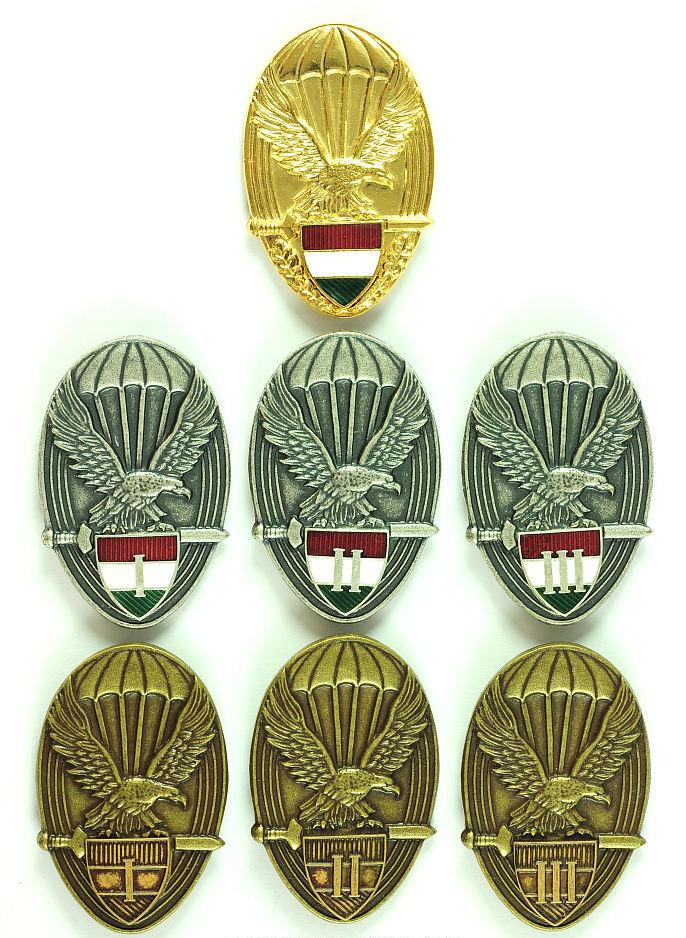
Hungarian parachutist badges after 1990

== See also ==
- 1st Parachute Battalion (Hungary)
- Parachutist Badge (United Kingdom)
- Parachutist Badge (United States)
- Parachutist Badge (Germany)
- Szent László Infantry Division
