= 1st Pioneer Battalion =

1st Pioneer Battalion may refer to:

- 1st Pioneer Battalion (Australia): a unit of the Australian Army that served during the First World War
- 2/1st Pioneer Battalion (Australia): a unit of the Australian Army that served during the Second World War
- 1st Combat Engineer Battalion: a United States Marine Corps unit, which was originally designated as the 1st Pioneer Battalion

== See also ==
- 1st Battalion (disambiguation)
