= 1st Marine Raider Battalion =

1st Marine Raider Battalion may refer to:

- 1st Marine Raider Battalion (World War II)
- 1st Marine Raider Battalion (MARSOC)

== See also ==
- 1st Battalion (disambiguation)
