= 21st Field Artillery Regiment =

US military unit

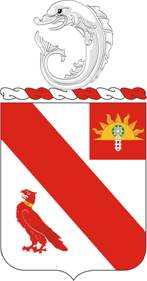
- Coat of arms
- Active: 1916–1921; 1939–1946; 1948–1950; 1951–1953; 1954–1957
- Country: United States
- Branch: Army
- Type: Field artillery
- Motto: Progressi Sunt (They Have Advanced)

Insignia
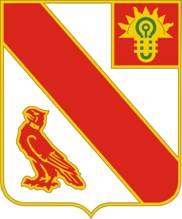
- Distinctive unit insignia

The 21st Field Artillery Regiment is a field artillery regiment of the United States Army first formed in 1916. A parent regiment under the U.S. Army Regimental System, all components of the regiment are currently inactive. The 1st Battalion 21st Field Artillery Regiment (United States), the regiment's final active component, deactivated on 12 June 2014.

== Further combat service by regimental elements ==
The 1st Battalion, 21st Field Artillery served in Vietnam with the 1st Cavalry Division.

Battery A, 21st Field Artillery served in Operation Desert Storm as the 1st Cavalry Division's general support MLRS battery.

== Lineage and honors ==
=== Lineage ===
- Constituted 1 July 1916 in the Regular Army as the 21st Field Artillery
- Organized 1 June 1917 at Camp Wilson, Texas
- Assigned 12 December 1917 to the 5th Division
- Relieved 4 November 1920 from assignment to the 5th Division
- Inactivated 23 September 1921 at Camp Bragg, North Carolina
- Assigned 24 March 1923 to the 9th Division
- Relieved 1 January 1930 from assignment to the 9th Division and assigned to the 5th Division (later redesignated as the 5th Infantry Division)
- Activated 6 October 1939 at Fort Knox, Kentucky
- Reorganized and redesignated 1 October 1940 as the 21st Field Artillery Battalion
- Inactivated (less Batteries B and C) 20 September 1946 at Ladd Field, Alaska (Batteries B and C concurrently inactivated at Camp Campbell, Kentucky)
- Activated 3 June 1948 at Fort Jackson, South Carolina
- Inactivated 30 April 1950 at Fort Jackson, South Carolina
- Activated 1 March 1951 at Indiantown Gap Military Reservation, Pennsylvania
- Inactivated 1 September 1953 at Indiantown Gap Military Reservation, Pennsylvania
- Activated 25 May 1954 in Germany
- Relieved 1 June 1957 from assignment to the 5th Infantry Division; concurrently, reorganized and redesignated as the 21st Artillery, a parent regiment under the Combat Arms Regimental System
- Redesignated 1 September 1971 as the 21st Field Artillery
- Withdrawn 16 March 1987 from the Combat Arms Regimental System and reorganized under the United States Army Regimental System
- Redesignated 1 October 2005 as the 21st Field Artillery Regiment

=== Campaign participation credit ===
- World War I: St. Mihiel; Lorraine 1918
- World War II: Normandy; Northern France; Rhineland; Ardennes-Alsace; Central Europe
- Vietnam: Defense; Counteroffensive; Counteroffensive, Phase II; Counteroffensive, Phase III; Tet Counteroffensive; Counteroffensive, Phase IV; Counteroffensive, Phase V; Counteroffensive, Phase VI; Tet 69/Counteroffensive; Summer-Fall 1969; Winter-Spring 1970; Sanctuary Counteroffensive; Counteroffensive, Phase VII; Consolidation I; Consolidation II; Cease-Fire
- Southwest Asia: Defense of Saudi Arabia; Liberation and Defense of Kuwait
- War on Terrorism: Campaigns to be determined

=== Decorations ===
- Presidential Unit Citation (Army) for PLEIKU PROVINCE
- Valorous Unit Award for FISH HOOK
- Meritorious Unit Commendation (Army) for VIETNAM 1967
- Meritorious Unit Commendation (Army) for SOUTHWEST ASIA 1990–1991

== Heraldry ==
=== Distinctive unit insignia ===
- Description

A Gold color metal and enamel device 1 3/32 inches (2.8 cm) in height overall consisting of a shield blazoned: Argent a bend Gules, in base an eagle close of the last gorged with a collar Or bearing a Lorraine cross of the second. On a sinister canton of the second a demi-sun Gold charged with an Aztec banner Vert garnished of the field (for the 3rd Field Artillery).

- Symbolism

The regiment was formed from the 3rd Field Artillery which is shown on the canton. The red bend denotes artillery support. The eagle with collar, one of the supporters of the arms of St. Mihiel, symbolizes the most important engagement in which the regiment participated.

- Background

The distinctive unit insignia was originally approved for the 21st Field Artillery Regiment on 27 November 1939. It was redesignated for the 21st Field Artillery Battalion on 13 December 1940. The insignia was redesignated for the 21st Artillery Regiment on 30 August 1957. Effective 1 September 1971, the insignia was redesignated for the 21st Field Artillery Regiment.

=== Coat of arms ===
- Blazon
  - Shield: Argent a bend Gules, in base an eagle close of the last gorged with a collar Or bearing a Lorraine cross of the second. On a sinister canton of the second a demi-sun Gold charged with an Aztec banner Vert garnished of the field (for the 3rd Field Artillery).
  - Crest: On a wreath of the colors Argent and Gules, a dolphin embowed Argent.
  - Motto: PROGRESSI SUNT (They Have Advanced).
- Symbolism
  - Shield: The regiment was formed from the 3rd Field Artillery which is shown on the canton. The red bend denotes artillery support. The eagle with collar, one of the supporters of the arms of St. Mihiel, symbolizes the most important engagement in which the regiment participated.
  - Crest: The dolphin represents overseas service.
- Background: The coat of arms was originally approved for the 21st Field Artillery Regiment on 5 February 1921. It was amended to correct the blazon on 20 May 1921. It was redesignated for the 21st Field Artillery Battalion on 13 December 1940. The insignia was redesignated for the 21st Artillery Regiment on 30 August 1957. Effective 1 September 1971, the insignia was redesignated for the 21st Field Artillery Regiment.

== Mascot ==
- Cecile Fleury

== Current configuration ==
- 1st Battalion, 21st Field Artillery Regiment
- 2nd Battalion, 21st Field Artillery Regiment
- 3rd Battalion, 21st Field Artillery Regiment

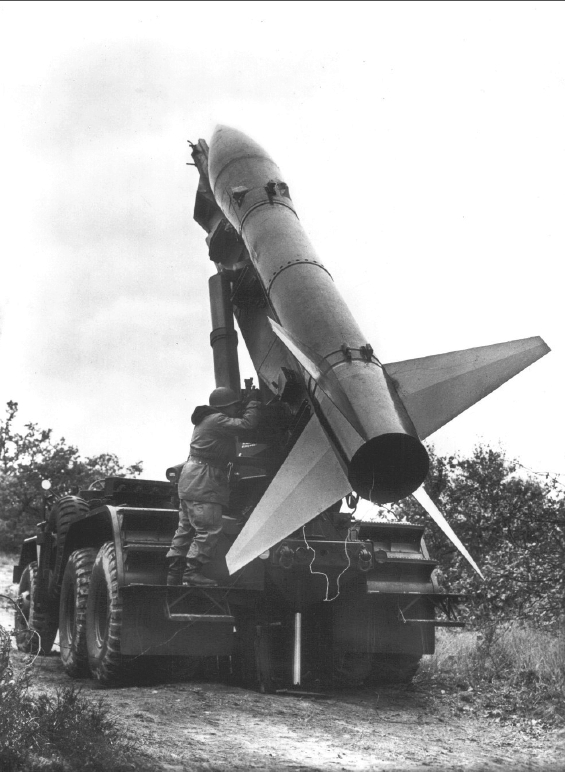
Honest John MGR-1, Germany, 1960

In the June 1965 Order of Battle – USAREUR/7th Army Non-divisional Artillery, the 3rd MSL Bn, 21st FA (Honest John) was included in the VII Corps Artillery, 72nd Field Artillery group, Larson Bks, Kitzingen, Germany.

In the September 1970 Order of Battle – USAREUR/7th Army Non-divisional Artillery, the 3rd MSL Bn, 21st FA (Honest John) was included in VII Corps Artillery, 72nd Field Artillery group, Fiori Bks, Aschaffenburg, Germany.

The unit was inactivated 30 September 1974.

- 4th Battalion, 21st Field Artillery Regiment was activated on 31 March 1959 at Bell, California as part of the 63rd Infantry Division and inactivated there on 31 December 1965.
- 5th Battalion, 21st Field Artillery Regiment
- 6th Battalion, 21st Field Artillery Regiment

== See also ==
- Field Artillery Branch (United States)
