= 3rd Lithuanian Fusilier Reserve Battalion =

- Active: March 1–July 1, 1813 (as a separate Battalion)
- Disbanded: December 12, 1813
- Country: Kingdom of Prussia
- Branch: Prussian Army
- Engagements: Napoleonic Wars; War of the Sixth Coalition; German campaign of 1813

Commanders
- First and only commander: Captain von Clausewitz

The 3rd Lithuanian Fusilier Reserve Battalion (Lithuanian: 3-asis lietuvių fuzilierių rezervinis batalionas; German: 3. Litauisches Füsilier Reserve Bataillon) was a fusilier battalion of the Prussian Army during the War of the Sixth Coalition. The name "Lithuanian" references Lithuania Minor and its Prussian Lithuanians.

== 1813 ==
=== Formation ===
Ludwig Yorck von Wartenburg marched into Königsberg on 8 January 1813 and immediately declared the mobilisation of all remaining able-bodied men. First, he called all the Krümper and recruits, which von Bülow had left to the east of the Vistula. So, Yorck created a large training camp to train the new soldiers. On March 1, seven reserve battalions were formed, which were the:

- 1st East Prussian Musketeer Reserve Battalion
- 2nd East Prussian Musketeer Reserve Battalion
- 3rd East Prussian Musketeer Reserve Battalion
- 4th East Prussian Musketeer Reserve Battalion
- 1st Lithuanian Fusilier Reserve Battalion
- 2nd Lithuanian Fusilier Reserve Battalion
- 3rd Lithuanian Fusilier Reserve Battalion

The 3rd Lithuanian Fusilier Reserve Battalion was formed in Königsberg, under the command of Captain von Clausewitz from the 2nd West Prussian Infantry Regiment. He was promoted to Major on March 26. In early June, the Battalion was in the vanguard of von Bülow's Corps.

=== Assigning to various regiments ===
The unit retained its name until July 1. This and other reserve battalions were concentrated into reserve regiments on 1 July 1813. The 3rd Lithuanian Fusilier Reserve Battalion was made the 5th Reserve Infantry Regiment's 4th Battalion.

The Battalion was disbanded on December 12 and its men used to reinforce the regiment's other battalions.

== 1815 ==
After Napoleon was defeated, the Prussian Army was reorganized, and so the 5th Reserve Infantry Regiment became the 17th Infantry Regiment on 1 March 1815.

== Sources ==
- von Plotho, Carl (1817). Der Krieg in Deutschland und Frankreich in den Jahren 1813 und 1814 (in German). Vol. 1. Berlin.
- Alt, Georg (1869). Das Königlich Preußische stehende Heer: Kurzgefasste Geschichte seiner sämmtlichen Truppenkörper (in German).
- Pohlmann (1905). Geschichte des Infanterie-regiments Graf Barfuß (4. Westfälischen) Nr.17 in neunzehntem Jahrhundert (PDF) (in German). pp. 9–12.
- Mittler, E.S. (1914). Das preussische Heer der Befreiungskriege: Das preussische Heer im Jahre 1813 (in German).
- Hofschröer, Peter (1987). Prussian Reserve, Militia & Irregular Troops 1806-15. ISBN 9780850457995.
- Fremont-Barnes, Gregory (2011). Armies of the Napoleonic Wars. Pen & Sword Books. ISBN 9781783032082.
