= 2nd Lithuanian Fusilier Reserve Battalion =

- Active: March 1–July 1, 1813 (as a separate Battalion)
- Country: Kingdom of Prussia
- Branch: Prussian Army
- Engagements: Napoleonic Wars; War of the Sixth Coalition; German campaign of 1813

Commanders
- First and only commander: Captain (later Major) von Douglas

The 2nd Lithuanian Fusilier Reserve Battalion (Lithuanian: 2-asis lietuvių fuzilierių rezervinis batalionas; German: 2. Litauisches Füsilier Reserve Bataillon) was a fusilier battalion of the Prussian Army during the War of the Sixth Coalition. The name "Lithuanian" references Lithuania Minor and its Prussian Lithuanians.

== 1813 ==
=== Formation ===
Ludwig Yorck von Wartenburg marched into Königsberg on 8 January 1813 and immediately declared the mobilisation of all remaining able-bodied men. First, he called all the Krümper and recruits, which von Bülow had left to the east of the Vistula. So, Yorck created a large training camp to train the new soldiers. On March 1, seven reserve battalions were formed, which were the:

- 1st East Prussian Musketeer Reserve Battalion
- 2nd East Prussian Musketeer Reserve Battalion
- 3rd East Prussian Musketeer Reserve Battalion
- 4th East Prussian Musketeer Reserve Battalion
- 1st Lithuanian Fusilier Reserve Battalion
- 2nd Lithuanian Fusilier Reserve Battalion
- 3rd Lithuanian Fusilier Reserve Battalion

The 2nd Lithuanian Fusilier Reserve Battalion was formed in Heilsberg. It was formed under the command of Captain von Douglas from the 4th East Prussian Infantry Regiment.

=== Assigning to various regiments ===
After a few months, on 1 July 1813, these and other reserve battalions were concentrated into reserve regiments. Its commander von Douglas was promoted to the rank of Major on June 25. The unit retained its name until July 1.

The 2nd Lithuanian Fusilier Reserve Battalion was made the 3rd Reserve Infantry Regiment's 3rd, i.e. Fusilier, Battalion.

== 1815 ==
After Napoleon was defeated, the Prussian Army was reorganized, and thus, the 3rd Reserve Infantry Regiment became the 15th Infantry Regiment on 1 March 1815.

== Sources ==
- von Plotho, Carl (1817). Der Krieg in Deutschland und Frankreich in den Jahren 1813 und 1814 (in German). Vol. 1. Berlin.
- Alt, Georg (1869). Das Königlich Preußische stehende Heer: Kurzgefasste Geschichte seiner sämmtlichen Truppenkörper (in German).
- Cramer, Felix (1897). Offizier-Geschichte des Infanterie-Regiments Prinz Friedrich der Niederlands (2. Westfälisches) Nr.15. Auf Befehl des Infanterie-Regiments Prinz Friedrich der Niederlande (in German).
- Mittler, E.S. (1914). Das preussische Heer der Befreiungskriege: Das preussische Heer im Jahre 1813 (in German).
- von Conrady, Emil Karl Georg Heinrich Wilhelm Albert (1929). Geschichte des königlich preussischen Sechsten Infanterie-Regiments: von seiner Stiftung im Jahre 1773 bis zu Ende des Jahres 1856 (in German). Vol. 6. E & W. Trapp.
- Hofschröer, Peter (1987). Prussian Reserve, Militia & Irregular Troops 1806-15. ISBN 9780850457995.
- Fremont-Barnes, Gregory (2011). Armies of the Napoleonic Wars. Pen & Sword Books. ISBN 9781783032082.
