= 3rd Arkansas Cavalry Regiment =

3rd Arkansas Cavalry Regiment may refer to:

- 3rd Arkansas Cavalry Regiment (Confederate)
- 3rd Arkansas Cavalry Regiment (Union)

== See also ==
- 3rd Arkansas Infantry Regiment (disambiguation)
- 3rd Arkansas Field Battery
- 3rd Arkansas Light Artillery
