= 76th Field Artillery Regiment =

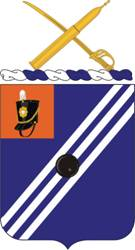
- Coat of arms
- Active: 1916-2015
- Country: (United States)
- Branch: United States Army
- Type: Field artillery
- Role: USARS parent regiment
- Size: regiment
- Home station: Fort Stewart, GA
- Nickname: Patriots
- Patron: Saint Barbara
- Mottos: Duty, The Spirit of '76
- Engagements: World War II; Iraq War; OIF I OIF III; OIF V

Commanders
- Notable commanders: John E. Sloan

Insignia
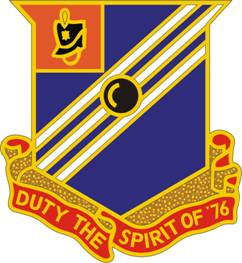
- Distinctive unit insignia

The 76th Field Artillery Regiment is a field artillery regiment of the United States Army. First formed as a cavalry regiment in 1916, the regiment was converted to field artillery in 1917, and served in Europe during World War I with the 3rd Division and as a separate battalion during World War II, as well as in peacetime at Fort Knox, KY, and Fort Devens, MA. Since 1959, the regiment has been a parent regiment under the Combat Arms Regimental System and the U.S. Army Regimental System, with regimental elements serving with the 3rd Infantry Division in Germany and Operation Iraqi Freedom, with the 7th Infantry Division in Korea, and in the Army Reserve. No regimental elements are currently active.

== History ==
One of the Regular Army units used to create the newly activated 3rd Division, the 76th Field Artillery was stationed at Fort Bliss, TX, when assigned to the division's 3rd Field Artillery Brigade, and deployed to France in the spring of 1918, initially occupying training areas at Camp Coetquidan, France. On 5–6 July 1918, the 76th Field Artillery led the 3rd Field Artillery Brigade into positions supporting the division in the Marne sector, on the right flank of the French XXXVIII Corps. During operations from 31 May – 13 August, the regiment supported the division during the defense of several sectors, and the Aisne-Marne Offensive, sustaining 104 wounded and 19 killed. Reassigned to the newly activated First United States Army, the regiment participated with the division in the St. Mihiel and Meuse-Argonne Offensives from 12 September – 27 October 1918, and also supported the 5th Division with the rest of the 3rd Field Artillery Brigade for part of the operation, sustaining a further 174 wounded and 21 killed before rejoining the 3rd Division on 14 November 1918 at Champlon, France. The regiment served with the division as part of the Army of Occupation around Coblenz, Germany under the command of Colonel Charles M. Bundel before returning to the United States in August 1919.

After returning to the United States, the regiment was stationed at Camp Pike, Arkansas from 1919 to 1921, and at Camp Lewis, Washington, from 1921 to 1922, before being split up, with the 2nd Battalion, 76th Field Artillery moving to The Presidio at Monterrey, California, while the rest of the regiment moved to Fort D.A. Russell, Wyoming. Regimental headquarters and 1st Battalion may have been inactive as a cost-reduction measure during the 1930s. Through the 1930s, the regiment supported Citizens' Military Training Camps and Reserve Officers' Training Corps (ROTC), with 2nd Battalion in Monterrey often working with the Stanford University ROTC detachment. In 1939, the regiment was relieved from the 3rd Division, all regimental elements were consolidated at Fort Ord, California, and the regiment was brought up to a full war-time strength of three battalions. The regiment was briefly assigned to the 7th Infantry Division from 1940 to 1941. While assigned to the 7th Infantry Division, the regiment was broken up into three separate battalions, the 74th, 75th, and 76th Field Artillery Battalions, in accordance with the new "triangular" infantry division organization.

The newly reorganized 76th Field Artillery Battalion spent most of 1942 and 1943 training and garrisoning the San Francisco area, prepared to defend against an expected Japanese invasion (at least during the early part of this period). The battalion was also relieved from the 7th Infantry Division, assigned as a General Headquarters unit, and converted from horse-drawn to motorized. During the first half of 1944, the battalion participated in training in the California-Arizona Maneuver Area with the 11th Armored Division, and moved across the country, with a brief stop in Camp Polk, Louisiana, before departing New York Port of Embarkation in June, 1944. After a brief stay in England for further training under the command of the XX Corps Artillery, 5th Field Artillery Group, 182nd Field Artillery Group, and 33rd Field Artillery Brigade, the battalion moved to France between 9=12 August. The battalion's first mission came on 19 August 1944, fired in general support of the 80th Infantry Division. In France, the battalion was assigned to First United States Army, and attached to V Corps, and V Corps Artillery. During August 1944, the battalion was attached to the 187th Field Artillery Group, the 2nd Infantry Division, and the 80th Infantry Division. During September 1944, the battalion operated under the command of the 187th Field Artillery Group, the 32nd Field Artillery Brigade, and the 422nd Field Artillery Group. From 7 September – 7 October 1944, the battalion formed a provisional truck battalion to haul ammunition, and sent several other smaller detachments for various missions. From 7–9 October 1944, the battalion received its various detachments back to prepare for combat operations, and on 10 October 1944 was attached to the V Corps and the 102nd Cavalry Group, supporting the group until 28 October 1944, when the battalion was attached to the 28th Infantry Division. The 76th operated in support of the 28th Infantry Division until 19 November, reinforcing the 42nd, 107th, 109th, and 229th Field Artillery Battalions at various times. From 19 November – 21 December, the battalion was attached to the 8th Infantry Division, operating in support of the 121st Infantry Regiment; the 311th Infantry Regiment; the 1st Battalion, 13th Infantry Regiment; and the 2d Ranger Battalion; and reinforcing the fires of the 42nd, 45th, 56th, 107th, 109th and 229th Field Artillery and 95th Armored Field Artillery Battalions at various times.

On 19 December 1944, the 76th was attached, with the entire 8th Infantry Division, from V Corps to VII Corps, but returned to V Corps on 21 December, and then attached to the 406th Field Artillery Group and placed in support of the 30th Infantry Division on 23 December. The battalion remained with the 406th, reinforcing the 30th Infantry Division's 230th Field Artillery Battalion until 16 January 1945. The 76th then briefly supported the 1st Battalion, 18th Infantry Regiment from 16 to 19 January 1945, returned to the 30th Infantry Division 19–21 January, and then spent the remainder of January attached to the 190th Field Artillery Group, reinforcing the 1st Infantry Division's 37th Field Artillery Battalion and the 2nd Infantry Division's 15th Field Artillery Battalion.

The following history section is taken directly from the 3rd Infantry Division website.

1st Battalion, 76th Field Artillery, Duty, The Spirit of 1776, was constituted in the Regular Army on 1 July 1916 with horse-drawn French 75mm pack guns. Initially organized at Fort Ethan Allen, Vermont on 13 June 1917, it served with distinction in France with the 3d Division during World War I in the Champagne-Marne, Aisne-Marne, St Mihiel, Meuse-Argonne, and Champagne 1918 campaigns. The 76th Field Artillery Regiment was presented the Croix de Guerre with Gold Star by the Tenth French Army.

On 16 October 1939, the 76th Field Artillery was relieved of assignment to the 3d Division and reassigned to the 7th Division Artillery. Landing on Utah Beach, 11 August 1944, the 76th was attached to First Army and served during four campaigns throughout Northern France, the Rhineland, Ardennes-Alsace, and Central Europe. In April 1945, the battalion was attached to the 1st Infantry Division for its advance into Czechoslovakia, providing continuous fires on the enemy for 189 consecutive days. On 20 November 1945, it was cited for the Order of the Day of the Belgian Army for action in the Ardennes with the 30th Infantry Division. Upon return to the United States, the battalion was inactivated on 27 November 1945 at Camp Kilmer, New Jersey.

Beginning 1 August 1946, the 76th Field Artillery went through a series of activations and re-designations, and on 8 October 1954, as 1st Howitzer Battalion, 76th Artillery, it was assigned to the 2d Infantry Brigade, Fort Devens, Massachusetts. The Battalion participated in numerous field exercises and tests in support of the Brigade Group, ROTC, and National Guard units. On 13 September 1971, it was re-designated the 1st Battalion, 76th Field Artillery, assigned to the 3d Infantry Division, and activated in Germany. The battalion served as an integral part of NATO forces during the Cold War. The battalion was later inactivated on 16 February 1987 in Schweinfurt, Germany.

NOTE: The history section indented above is cited to a dead link since the unit inactivated. Developing a new section based on available sources as of October 2017.

== Further service by regimental elements ==
- The 1st Battalion, 76th Field Artillery Regiment served with the 2nd Infantry Brigade at Fort Devens, MA, from 1958 to 1962; as a separate battalion from 1962 to 1972; and with the 3rd Infantry Division from 1972 to 1987. As Battery A, 76th Field Artillery, the unit continued to serve with 3rd Infantry Division from 1987 to 1992, and again briefly from 1995 to 1996. Reactivated as part of the Army's expansion for Operation Iraqi Freedom in 2004, the battalion deployed to Iraq three times and once to Afghanistan before inactivation in 2015.
- The 2nd Battalion, 76th Field Artillery Regiment served as a separate battalion in Korea and Fort Lewis, WA, from 1958 to 1971 and at Fort Riley, KS, from 1975 to 1978.
- The 3rd Battalion, 76th Field Artillery Regiment served briefly at Fort Carson, CO, in 1958; and with the 3rd Infantry Division in Germany from 1960 to 1972.
- The 4th Battalion, 76th Field Artillery Regiment served with the 7th Infantry Division in Korea and Fort Lewis from 1960 to 1971.
- The 5th Battalion, 76th Field Artillery Regiment served in the Army Reserve in Vermont from 1959 to 1965.

== Current status of regimental elements ==
- 1st Battalion, 76th Field Artillery Regiment: inactive since 2015
- 2nd Battalion, 76th Field Artillery Regiment: inactive since 1978
- 3rd Battalion, 76th Field Artillery Regiment: inactive since 1972
- 4th Battalion, 76th Field Artillery Regiment: inactive since 1971
- 5th Battalion, 76th Field Artillery Regiment: inactive since 1965

== Patriot Song ==
The Patriot Song was commissioned by the command staff during the unit's deployment in support of Operation Iraqi Freedom III. The battalion song was written by HHC Medic Josiah "Doc" O'Neil.

Patriot Song
Through the sands and storm
Crusaders lend an arm
We're ready night and day
For evil came our way
The Heat of the rising sun
The Knights have just begun
The Dogs came out to hunt
And evil ran away
The spirit of Seventy Six is marching
Forever on our thunder – in battle shakes the earth
Give me liberty or give me death
We're Patriots until the end
We're changing the history of war

== Lineage and honors ==
=== Lineage ===
- Constituted 1 July 1916 in the Regular Army as the 18th Cavalry
- Organized 13 June 1917 at Fort Ethan Allen, Vermont
- Converted and redesignated 1 November 1917 as the 76th Field Artillery
- Assigned 12 November 1917 to the 3d Division
- Relieved 16 October 1939 from assignment to the 3d Division
- Assigned 1 July 1940 to the 7th Division
- Reorganized and redesignated 22 January 1941 as the 76th Field Artillery Battalion
- Relieved 1 June 1941 from assignment to the 7th Division
- Inactivated 27 November 1945 at Camp Kilmer, New Jersey
- Redesignated 1 August 1946 as the 76th Armored Field Artillery Battalion and activated at Fort Knox, Kentucky
- Inactivated (less Battery A) 24 August 1948 at Fort Knox, Kentucky

(Battery A reorganized and redesignated 28 August 1953 as the 576th Armored Field Artillery Battery; inactivated 4 October 1954 at Fort Knox, Kentucky)

- Redesignated 8 October 1954 as the 76th Field Artillery Battalion and activated at Fort Devens, Massachusetts (576th Armored Field Artillery Battery concurrently redesignated as Battery A, 76th Field Artillery Battalion)
- Inactivated (less Battery B) 15 February 1958 at Fort Devens, Massachusetts (Battery B concurrently inactivated in Iceland)
- Reorganized and redesignated 31 July 1959 as the 76th Artillery, a parent regiment under the Combat Arms Regimental System
- Redesignated 1 September 1971 as the 76th Field Artillery
- Withdrawn 16 February 1987 from the Combat Arms Regimental System and reorganized under the United States Army Regimental System
- Redesignated 1 October 2005 as the 76th Field Artillery Regiment

=== Campaign participation credit ===
- World War I: Champagne-Marne; Aisne-Marne; St. Mihiel; Meuse-Argonne; Champagne 1918
- World War II: Northern France; Rhineland; Ardennes-Alsace; Central Europe
- War on Terrorism: Iraq

=== Decorations ===
- French Croix de Guerre with Gilt Star, World War I for CHAMPAGNE-MARNE and AISNE-MARNE
- Cited in the Order of the Day of the Belgian Army for action in the Ardennes

== Heraldry ==
=== Distinctive unit insignia ===
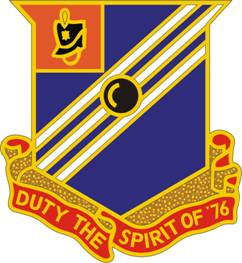

- Description: A Gold color metal and enamel device 1 1/8 inches (2.9 cm) in height overall consisting of a shield blazoned: Azure, three bendlets sinister Argent, a round shot Proper. On a canton Tenné, the headdress of the dragoons of 1836 Proper (for the 2nd Cavalry). Attached below and to the sides of the shield a Red scroll inscribed "DUTY THE SPIRIT OF '76" in Gold letters.
- Symbolism: The regiment was organized in 1917 from the 2nd Cavalry as the 18th Cavalry, changed to the 76th Field Artillery in the same year and served in France in the 3rd Division, the insignia of which forms the basis of the 2nd Cavalry shield, and the charges thereon is the crest of that regiment. The round shot symbolizes the motto.
- Background: The distinctive unit insignia was originally approved for the 76th Field Artillery Regiment on 19 February 1924. It was redesignated for the 76th Field Artillery Battalion on 3 December 1942. It was redesignated for the 76th Armored Field Artillery Battalion on 10 July 1947. The insignia was redesignated for the 76th Field Artillery Battalion on 13 October 1954. It was redesignated for the 76th Artillery Regiment on 10 June 1958. Effective 1 September 1971, it was redesignated for the 76th Field Artillery Regiment.

=== Coat of arms ===
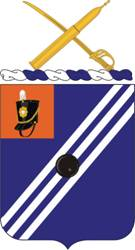

- Description/Blazon

Shield: Azure, three bendlets sinister Argent, a round shot Proper. On a canton Tenné, the headdress of the dragoons of 1836 Proper (for the 2nd Cavalry).
Crest: On a wreath of the colors Argent and Azure a Cavalry saber Or and a 75 mm fixed ammunition Proper in saltire.
Motto: DUTY, THE SPIRIT OF '76.

- Symbolism

Shield: The regiment was organized in 1917 from the 2nd Cavalry as the 18th Cavalry, changed to the 76th Field Artillery in the same year and served in France in the 3rd Division, the insignia of which forms the basis of the 2nd Cavalry shield, and the charges thereon is the crest of that regiment. The round shot symbolizes the motto.
Crest: The crest shows the dual Cavalry-Artillery character of the Regiment.
Background: The coat of arms was originally approved for the 76th Field Artillery Regiment on 19 January 1921. It was amended to correct the blazon of the shield on 1 October 1923. It was redesignated for the 76th Field Artillery Battalion on 3 December 1942. It was redesignated for the 76th Armored Field Artillery Battalion on 10 July 1947. The insignia was redesignated for the 76th Field Artillery Battalion on 13 October 1954. It was redesignated for the 76th Artillery Regiment on 10 June 1958. Effective 1 September 1971, it was redesignated for the 76th Field Artillery Regiment.

== See also ==
- Field Artillery Branch (United States)
