= 1st Lithuanian Fusilier Reserve Battalion =

- Active: March 1–July 1, 1813 (as a separate Battalion)
- Country: Kingdom of Prussia
- Branch: Prussian Army
- Engagements: Napoleonic Wars; War of the Sixth Coalition; German campaign of 1813; Battle of Luckau

Commanders
- First commander: Major von Lettow
- Second commander: Major von Röming

The 1st Lithuanian Fusilier Reserve Battalion (Lithuanian: 1-asis lietuvių fuzilierių rezervinis batalionas; German: 1. Litauisches Füsilier Reserve Bataillon or 1. Litthauisches Reserve-Füsilier-Bataillon) was a fusilier battalion of the Prussian Army during the War of the Sixth Coalition. The name "Lithuanian" references Lithuania Minor and its Prussian Lithuanians.

== 1813 ==
=== Formation ===
Ludwig Yorck von Wartenburg marched into Königsberg on 8 January 1813 and immediately declared the mobilisation of all remaining able-bodied men. First, he called all the Krümper and recruits, which von Bülow had left to the east of the Vistula. So, Yorck created a large training camp to train the new soldiers. On March 1, seven reserve battalions were formed, which were the:

- 1st East Prussian Musketeer Reserve Battalion
- 2nd East Prussian Musketeer Reserve Battalion
- 3rd East Prussian Musketeer Reserve Battalion
- 4th East Prussian Musketeer Reserve Battalion
- 1st Lithuanian Fusilier Reserve Battalion
- 2nd Lithuanian Fusilier Reserve Battalion
- 3rd Lithuanian Fusilier Reserve Battalion

The 1st Lithuanian Fusilier Reserve Battalion was formed in Königsberg, under the command of Major Georg Wilhelm von Lettow. Major von Lettow was from the 2nd West Prussian Infantry Regiment. The battalion was supposed to have 60 Non-commissioned officers, 13 musicians, 4 surgeons, and 728 Gemeiner.

At the end of May, this battalion was in Cottbus. Under the same commander, the unit fought in the Battle of Luckau on June 4.

=== Assigning to various regiments ===
The unit retained its name until July 1. Then, on 1 July 1813, this and other reserve battalions were concentrated into various reserve regiments. The 1st Lithuanian Fusilier Reserve Battalion was made the 1st Reserve Infantry Regiment's 3rd, i.e. Fusilier, Battalion. At the time, the unit was commanded by Major von Röming.

== 1815 ==
After Napoleon was defeated, the Prussian Army was reorganized, and so the 1st Reserve Infantry Regiment became the 13th Infantry Regiment on 1 March 1815.

== Sources ==
- von Plotho, Carl (1817). Der Krieg in Deutschland und Frankreich in den Jahren 1813 und 1814 (in German). Vol. 1. Berlin.
- Mischke (1838). Geschichte des Königlich Preussischen Dreizehnten Infanterie-Regiments, von 1813 bis 1838: zur 25 jährigen Jubel-Feier der Stiftung des Regiments (in German). Münster.
- Alt, Georg (1869). Das Königlich Preußische stehende Heer: Kurzgefasste Geschichte seiner sämmtlichen Truppenkörper (in German).
- Mittler, E.S. (1914). Das preussische Heer der Befreiungskriege: Das preussische Heer im Jahre 1813 (in German).
- Hofschröer, Peter (1987). Prussian Reserve, Militia & Irregular Troops 1806-15. ISBN 9780850457995.
- Fremont-Barnes, Gregory (2011). Armies of the Napoleonic Wars. Pen & Sword Books. ISBN 9781783032082.
