= 1st Garrison Battalion, Essex Regiment =

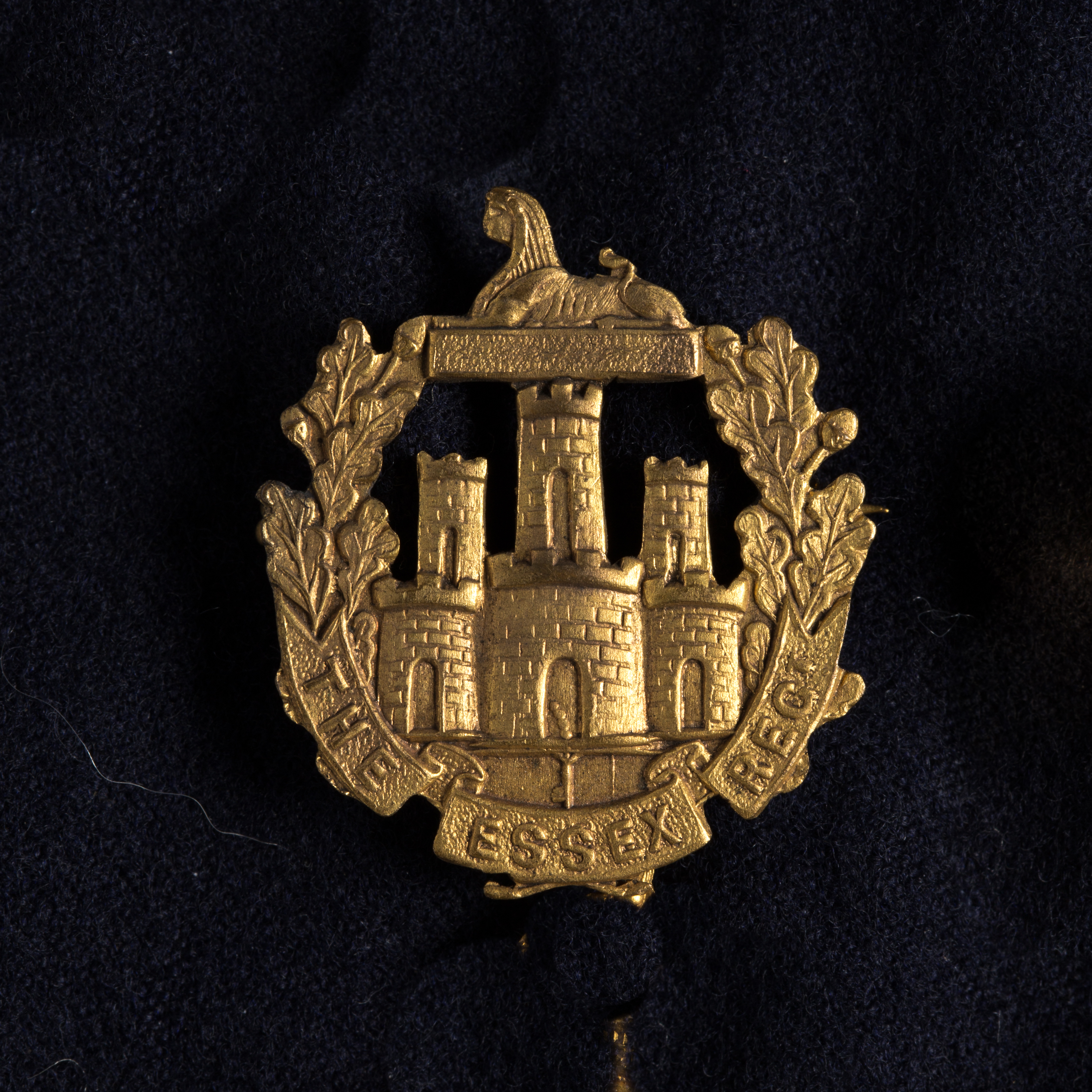
- Essex Regiment cap badge, WWI
- Active: 21 July 1915–2 May 1919
- Country: United Kingdom
- Branch: British Army
- Role: Lines of Communication
- Size: 4–6 Companies
- Part of: Mediterranean Expeditionary Force; Egyptian Expeditionary Force
- Engagements: Gallipoli; Sinai and Palestine Campaign

The 1st Garrison Battalion, Essex Regiment, was a unit formed from older or unfit men for line of communication duties during World War I. It served at Gallipoli, carrying out a multitude of tasks both at the bases and under fire on the beaches. The battalion continued serving at the bases in Egypt and at Salonika until after the end of the war.

== Origin ==
The unit was formed as a provisional battalion on 21 July 1915 from drafts of officers and men who were unfit for active service on account of age, infirmities, or from wounds received on the Western Front. These drafts were drawn from Special Reserve battalions garrisoning seaports in Eastern Command. (The Special Reserve was the former Militia, whose wartime role was to train reinforcements for the Regular Army):

Harwich

- 3rd Bn, Bedfordshire Regiment
- 4th Bn, Bedfordshire Regiment
- 3rd Bn, Norfolk Regiment
- 3rd Bn, Suffolk Regiment
- 3rd Bn, Essex Regiment

Chatham

- 3rd Bn, Royal West Surrey Regiment
- 5th Bn, Middlesex Regiment
- 6th Bn, Middlesex Regiment
- 3rd Bn, Royal West Kent Regiment
- 3rd Bn, Northamptonshire Regiment

Dover

- 3rd Bn East Surrey Regiment
- 5th Bn, Royal Fusiliers
- 6th Bn, Royal Fusiliers
- 3rd Bn, East Kent Regiment
- 3rd Bn, Sussex Regiment

The battalion formed at Denham Camp in Buckinghamshire with a strength of 15 officers and 1144 other ranks, organised into four double companies. It was inspected by Lieutenant-General Sir Leslie Rundle, General Officer Commanding-in-Chief, Eastern Command, on 27 July and two days later its status was changed from a Provisional Battalion to 1st Garrison Battalion, Essex Regiment and all the men were transferred to that regiment. Lieutenant-Colonel William Tankerville Monypenny Reeve, CMG, of the 2nd Bn, Leinster Regiment, was appointed Commanding Officer (CO) in August. He had lost his left forearm at the Battle of Armentières in 1914. One of the company commanders was Captain Sir Capel Charles Wolseley, 9th Baronet, of the 3rd Bn, East Surrey Regiment, a former British Vice consul at Archangel, Russia. Additional officers transferred from Special Reserve and New Army battalions brought the unit up to full establishment.

== Gallipoli campaign ==
The new battalion was destined for the Gallipoli Campaign. On 24 August it entrained for Devonport, where it boarded HM Transport Z36 (the RMS Empress of Britain). It disembarked at Mudros, Lemnos, on 6 September, and went into camp at Turks' Head Peninsula.

The men were medically examined on arrival and classified as:

- A Class: fit for work on the Gallipoli beaches, all of whom were posted to D Company
- B Class: fit for guard duties etc on the Lines of Communication
- C Class: fit only for sedentary work.

The duties carried out by the men were wide-ranging: a large number were employed at the hospitals, others with the Sanitary Section, the Egyptian Labour Corps, the Machine Gun School and the Remount Depot. Senior Non-Commissioned Officers (NCOs) acted as drill instructors and as camp staff, other ranks (ORs) as cooks, waiters and orderlies, servants to chaplains, cemetery attendants, storemen, platelayers with the Royal Engineers' railway troops, and as motor cycle despatch riders, signallers and telephonists. The battalion provided picquets and guards for various key points such as the water condenser, for Turkish prisoners of war (PoWs) in camp and on board ships in Mudros harbour, and camp patrols to prevent illicit sale of alcohol and theft of stores. The battalion turned out Guards of Honour for dignitaries visiting Lemnos, including the commander-in-chief of the French fleet, and on 10 November for the Secretary of State for War, Lord Kitchener.

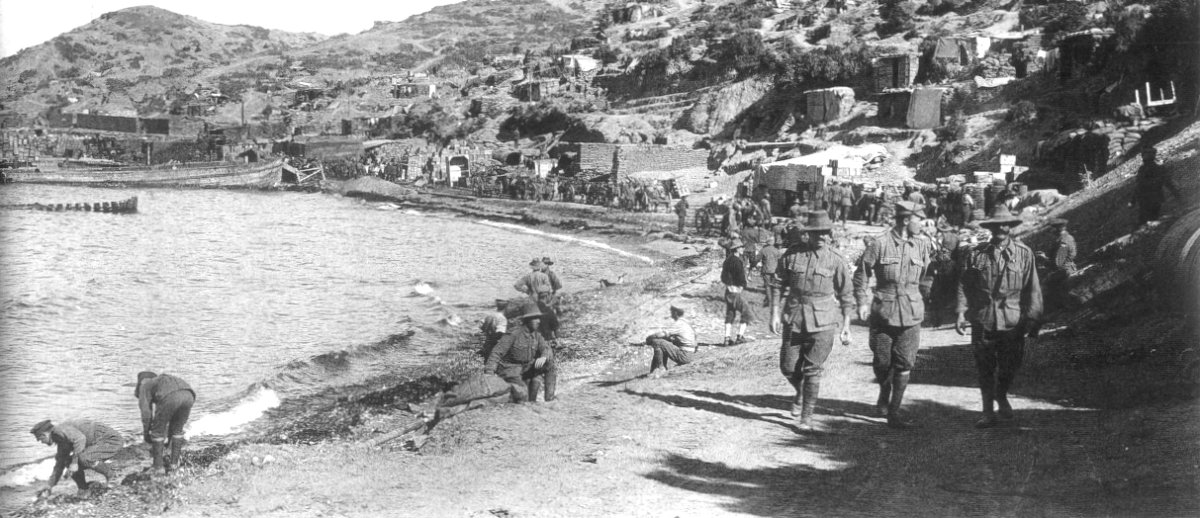
Anzac Cove, where a detachment of 1st Garrison Bn served under fire during the Gallipoli Campaign.

The battalion of unfit men suffered a good deal from the sickness endemic throughout the campaign, and by the middle of November three officers and 113 men had been invalided to the base or sent home. Lieutenant-Colonel Reeve contracted dysentery at Lemnos and was evacuated home aboard the hospital ship Aquitania. He died at Queen Alexandra's Military Hospital at Millbank on 28 September 1915 and was buried in Brompton Cemetery. Major Stuart Goode (4th Bn, Bedfordshire Regiment) took over as CO, and was confirmed in the rank of temporary Lt-Col on 15 October. The battalion was reinforced by men and boys from the Royal Naval Division, and later by a party attached from 1/7th Bn, Royal Welch Fusiliers, and by Australian troops, so that two additional companies were formed as Nos 1 and 2 Detail Companies.

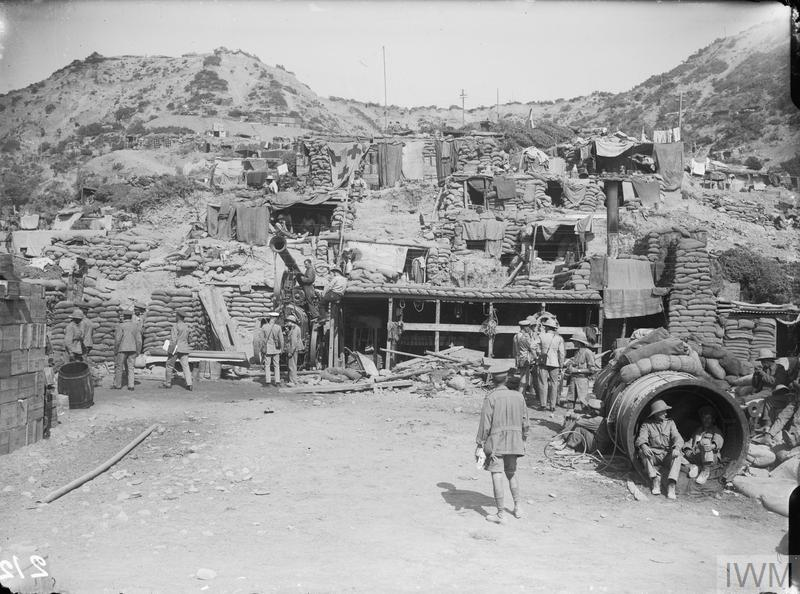
Dugouts and water condensers at Anzac Cove.

Meanwhile, D Company landed at Anzac Cove on the Gallipoli peninsula on 19 September, with a strength of five officers and 212 other ranks, and pitched tents. The detachment's duties mainly covered water supply, ammunition carrying, burial parties, guarding PoWs, and operating the light railway. The company suffered a number of casualties from shellfire and small arms fire, the first fatality from enemy action occurring when a party carrying rations to the front line was hit by Shrapnel shell. In October Capt Sir Capel Wolseley led a party of reinforcements from the battalion on Lemnos and took command of the detachment. In November the detachment headquarters camp came under long-range machine gun fire and after suffering a number of killed and wounded moved into dugouts. On 23 October a further party of 74 NCOs and ORs from Lemnos landed at Cape Helles on the peninsula to carry out similar beach duties.

During December the decision was made to end the campaign and evacuate the troops on the peninsula. D Company (now four officers and 129 ORs) returned from Anzac to Lemnos on 5 December. One man was drowned during unloading at Mudros, and Private H Spensley was later awarded a Royal Humane Society bronze medal for his rescue attempt. The detachment re-embarked for Imbros on 9 December. The rest of the battalion having been medically reclassified into those fit or unfit for hard work, a wing comprising A and C Companies (seven officers and 350 ORs) was sent to Tenedos on 26 December. The men were employed in loading and unloading ammunition, carried out at night to avoid observation by Turkish aircraft.

Cape Helles was evacuated between 30 December and 6 January 1916, completing the withdrawal from the peninsula. The detachment at Imbros continued serving there until 5 February 1916, when it returned to Lemnos and joined the rest of the battalion aboard SS Ausonia bound for Egypt.

== Later war ==
In Egypt the battalion was classified as GHQ Troops, carrying out various duties at the bases in Egypt and Palestine during the Sinai and Palestine Campaign. After the war with Turkey ended with the Armistice of Mudros on 30 October 1918, the battalion was transferred to Salonika, where the Macedonian campaign had ended. It continued with its line of communication duties until it was disbanded on 2 May 1919.

== Online sources ==
- Commonwealth War Graves Commission
- The Long, Long Trail
