= 1st Battalion, 36th Infantry Regiment =

1st Battalion 36th Infantry Regiment
- Country: United States
- Branch: Army
- Type: Infantry
- Part of: 1st Brigade Combat Team, 1st Armored Division
- Nickname: Spartans
- Motto: "Deeds Not Words"
- Engagements: World War II; Iraq War

The 1st Battalion 36th Infantry Regiment (or 1-36 Infantry) is a United States Army infantry battalion. It is assigned to the 1st Armored Brigade Combat Team of the 1st Armored Division in Fort Bliss, Texas.

== History ==
=== World War II ===
The battalion fought alongside its divisional comrades in Normandy in thick fighting through hedgerows. The unit continued fighting near Argentan and helped destroy German Forces in the Falaise Gap. In the winter of 1944, the battalion was caught up in major fighting while advancing into Germany. The battalion fought in battles at the Siegfried Line and also at the village of Echtz. For both actions, the unit received a Presidential Unit Citation. In the German heartland, the company, along with the rest of the 3rd Armored Division, helped close the Ruhr Pocket in 1945. The unit was deactivated on 10 November 1945. Company A, 36th Infantry Regiment served as the defining ancestor of the modern 1st Battalion, 36th Infantry Regiment, during the Second World War, and served across France, Belgium, and Germany.

=== Operation Iraqi Freedom ===
1-36IN deployed during various phases of Operation Iraqi Freedom. The Spartans earned both the Presidential Unit Citation for their 2003-2004 deployment & the Meritorious Unit Citation for their 2009-2010 deployment.
