= 1st Battalion, 21st Field Artillery Regiment =

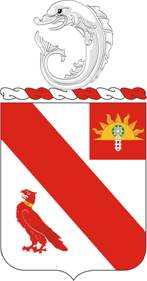
- 21st Field Artillery Regiment Coat of Arms
- Active: 1916–1921; 1923–1946, 1948–1957, 1960–1979, 1986–2014
- Country: United States
- Branch: U.S. Army
- Type: Artillery
- Role: Fire support
- Size: Battalion
- Garrison/HQ: Fort Hood
- Nickname: "First Strike"
- Engagements: World War I, World War II; Vietnam War, Desert Storm, Iraqi Freedom, Enduring Freedom

Insignia
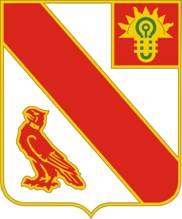
- 21st FAR Distinctive unit insignia

The 1st Battalion, 21st Field Artillery was a field artillery battalion of the United States Army based in Fort Hood, Texas. It was a subordinate unit of the 41st Fires Brigade (United States).

== History ==
The 21st Field Artillery was constituted in the Regular Army on 1 July 1916 and organized at Camp Wilson, Texas on 1 June 1917. It was assigned to the 5th Division in 1917 and saw action in France during World War I, participating in the St. Mihiel and Lorraine (1918) Campaigns.

The 21st Field Artillery was inactivated 23 September 1921 at Camp Bragg, North Carolina. On 24 March 1923 it was assigned to the 9th Division and relieved 1 January 1930 from assignment to the 9th Division. It was then assigned to the 5th Division and later redesignated as the 5th Infantry Division.

Following World War I, the 21st Field Artillery was retired until 6 October 1939 when it was reactivated as part of the 5th Division. The 21st Field Artillery fought in the World War II campaigns of Normandy, Northern France, the Rhineland, Ardennes-Alsace, and Central Europe.

The 21st Field Artillery was inactivated on 20 September 1946 at Ladd Field, Alaska. Then activated 3 June 1948 at Fort Jackson, South Carolina, inactivated 30 April 1950 at Fort Jackson, South Carolina, activated 1 March 1951 at Indiantown Gap Military Reservation, Pennsylvania, inactivated 1 September 1953 at Indiantown Gap Military Reservation, Pennsylvania, activated 25 May 1954 in Germany, inactivated 1 June 1957 at Fort Ord, California, and relieved from assignment to the 5th Infantry Division; concurrently, redesignated as Headquarters and Headquarters Battery, 1st Battalion, 21st Artillery. It was then redesignated 1 July 1960 as Headquarters and Headquarters Battery, 1st Howitzer Battalion, 21st Artillery, assigned to the 1st Cavalry Division, and activated in Korea (organic elements concurrently constituted and activated). It was the redesignated 1 September 1963 as the 1st Battalion, 21st Artillery.

The newly formed 1st Battalion, 21st Field Artillery began its association with the 1st Cavalry Division. During the Vietnam War, the 1st Battalion, 21st Field Artillery participated in 15 different campaigns including the Tet Counteroffensive and Counteroffensives I-VII, earning the Presidential Unit Citation for action in Pleiku Province, the Valorous Unit Award for the Fish Hook Campaign, and the Meritorious Unit Commendation for operations in Vietnam (1967). Additionally, Alpha and Bravo Batteries were awarded the Presidential Unit Citation for action in Binh Thaun Province.

The 1st Battalion, 21st Field Artillery was relieved 13 September 1972 from assignment to the 1st Cavalry Division and assigned to the 4th Infantry Division. It was inactivated 19 December 1973 at Fort Carson, Colorado and relieved 21 April 1975 from assignment to the 4th Infantry Division, assigned to the 1st Cavalry Division, and activated at Fort Hood, Texas.

On 2 July 1986, the 1st Battalion, 21st Field Artillery was reorganized and redesignated as Battery A, 21st Field Artillery, and continued to serve in the 1st Cavalry Divisionry. In August 1990, the 1st Cavalry Division was alerted for deployment to Southwest Asia as part of the joint forces participating in Operation Desert Shield. 1st Cavalry Division MLRS fires from Alpha Battery, 21st Field Artillery illuminated the night skies and crippled Iraqi targets deep within enemy territory.

Upon activation on 16 September 1997, with the addition of Bravo (MLRS) and Charlie (Target Acquisition) Batteries, the 1st Battalion, 21st Field Artillery became the first Divisional MLRS Command and Attack Battalion in the U.S. Army. In September 1998, Charlie Battery, 1st Battalion, 21st Field Artillery deployed to Bosnia-Herzegovina to provide 24-hour radar support to Task Force Eagle.

On 28 July 2000, 68th Chemical Company, the division's smoke, reconnaissance, and decontamination forces, became part of the battalion. The 1st Battalion, 21st Field Artillery completed the Army's first deployment of a divisional command and attack battalion, Operation Desert Strike 01–07, an external evaluation at Fort Bliss, New Mexico, in April 2001. In support of Operation Iraqi Freedom, the 68th Chemical Company and the 1–227 FSE out of HHS/1-21, deployed from February 2003 through June 2003. The FSE planned and executed SEAD missions in support of Apache deep attacks. 68th Chemical Company's Smoke Platoon, while attached to 3rd Infantry Division, crossed the border into Iraq and were among the first U.S. soldiers to enter Baghdad.

In March 2004, Task Force 1–21 deployed to Iraq for combat operations under the task organization of the 5th Brigade Combat Team, 1st Cavalry Division during Operation Iraqi Freedom II. Organic companies of 1–21 FA were augmented by elements of the 68th Chemical Company to form the task force. Task Force Rocket was responsible for a portion of the Al-Rasheed district in southern Baghdad from March 2004 – March 2005. During that time the task force conducted daily patrols, ambushes, raids, convoy escorts, target acquisition, and counter-battery cannon fires. The battalion contributed to the first ever free elections held in Iraq in January 2005. Following redeployment, Charlie Battery, 1–21 FA and 68th Chemical Company were inactivated in July 2005.

The 1st Cavalry Division's first Silver Star Medal for valor in combat during this deployment was presented to Pfc. Christopher Fernandez, of Battery A, 1st Battalion, 21st Field Artillery Regiment, on 13 August 2004. Fernandez was awarded the Silver Star for his actions on the night of 5 May, when his unit were ambushed while on a patrol through the city's Saidiyah neighborhood. An improvised explosive device rendered the patrol's rear vehicle inoperable. The patrol was hit with small-arms fire and immediately returned fire. Two U.S. soldiers were killed and five others were wounded in the IED explosion. Fernandez returned fire with his M-249 Squad Automatic Weapon, reloading it at least once during the short engagement, said Capt. Thomas Pugsley, Battery A's commander. Seeing that the stricken vehicle's M-240B machine gun was unused. Fernandez left his vehicle, ran to the disabled humvee and recovered the weapon and its ammunition. Fernandez then opened fire on the enemy. The hand guards covering the machine-gun's barrel, so the gunner's hands will not burn, were blown off in the explosion. Fernandez kept firing even though his hands were burning. One other soldier received a Bronze Star with V device and another received an Army Commendation with V device.

On 19 August 2005, the 1st Battalion 21st Field Artillery was relieved from the 1st Cavalry Division and attached to the 4th Fires Brigade. The 1st Battalion 21st Field Artillery made its transition as part of the Army's new modular transformation concept. Falling under the newly formed fires brigade model, in 2006 the battalion fielded and manned the 575th Forward Support Company and Charlie (MLRS) Battery, 1–21 FA. On 16 April 2007, the fires brigade reflagged as the 41st Fires Brigade.

In April 2008, 1st Battalion, 21st Field Artillery, deployed in support of Operation Iraqi Freedom 08–10. During their most recent deployment, the battalion conducted an in-lieu of mission, responsible for conducting detainee operations, and security operations at Camp Bucca, Iraq. Charlie Battery, 1–21 FA received a change of mission in July 2008, and conducted convoy security operations in support of international police advisors and provincial reconstruction teams in Basra and Al Kut, Iraq. The 1st Battalion, 21st Field Artillery redeployed to Fort Hood, Texas in July 2009.

The 1st Battalion, 21st Field Artillery deployed over 150 soldiers to Afghanistan in September 2011. The unit trained the Afghan National Army on artillery operations, operating the Artillery School in Kabul. Simultaneously, other members served on artillery mobile education and training teams (A-METT). The unit redeployed to Ft. Hood in summer 2012. Upon return to Ft. Hood, 1–21 FA did two rotations at the National Training Center in January 2013 and June 2013, supporting 3BCT, 1CD and 2BCT, 4ID respectively.

On 12 June 2014, the battalion cased its colors for the seventh time during an inactivation ceremony in front of the 41st Fires Brigade Headquarters.

== Inactivation ==
On 12 June 2014, First Strike inactivated at Ft. Hood, Texas. It fell under 41st Field Artillery Brigade, 1st Cavalry Division, Fort Hood, TX. It consisted of:

- Headquarters and Headquarters Battery (HHB)
- Alpha Battery (M270 MLRS)
- Bravo Battery (M270 MLRS)
- 575th Forward Support Company (575th FSC)
- 324th Network Support Company (324th NSC)

== Honors & decorations ==
- Campaign participation credit

World War I: – St. Mihiel; -Lorraine 1918
World War II: -Northern France; -Rhineland; -Ardennes-Alsace; -Central Europe
Vietnam: -Defense; -Counteroffensive, Phase I; -Counteroffensive, Phase II; -Counteroffensive, Phase III; -Tet -Counteroffensive; -Counteroffensive, Phase IV; -Counteroffensive, Phase V; -Counteroffensive, Phase IV; -Tet 69/Counteroffensive; -Summer-Fall 1969; -Winter-Spring 1970; -Sanctuary Counteroffensive; -Counteroffensive; Phase VII; Consolidation I; -Consolidation II; -Cease-Fire
Southwest Asia: -Defense of Saudi Arabia; -Liberation and Defense of Kuwait; -Cease-Fire
War on Terrorism: Campaigns to be determined

- Decorations

Presidential Unit Citation (Army) for PLEIKU PROVINCE
Valorous Unit Award for FISH HOOK
Meritorious Unit Commendation (Army) for VIETNAM 1967
Meritorious Unit Commendation (Army) for SOUTHWEST ASIA 1990–1991
Republic of Vietnam Cross of Gallantry with Palm for VIETNAM 1965–1969
Republic of Vietnam Cross of Gallantry with Palm for VIETNAM 1969–1970
Republic of Vietnam Cross of Gallantry with Palm for VIETNAM 1970–1971
Republic of Vietnam Cross of Gallantry with Palm for VIETNAM 1971–1972
Republic of Vietnam Civil Action Honor Medal, First Class for VIETNAM 1969–1970

- Battery A additionally entitled to:

Presidential Unit Citation (Army) for BINH THUAN PROVINCE

- Battery B additionally entitled to:

Presidential Unit Citation (Army) for BINH THUAN PROVINCE
Valorous Unit Award for QUANG NAM
