= 3rd Arkansas Infantry Regiment =

3rd Arkansas Infantry Regiment may refer to:

- 3rd Arkansas Infantry Regiment (Confederate)
- 3rd Arkansas Infantry Regiment (Union), a Union regiment that failed to complete organization
- 3rd Arkansas Colored Infantry Regiment, a Union regiment
- 3rd Arkansas Consolidated Infantry Regiment, a Confederate regiment
- 3rd Regiment, Arkansas State Troops, a unit of the Provisional Army of Arkansas

== See also ==
- 3rd Arkansas Cavalry Regiment (disambiguation)
- 3rd Arkansas Field Battery
- 3rd Arkansas Light Artillery
