= 1st Battalion, 76th Field Artillery Regiment =

1st Battalion, 76th Field Artillery
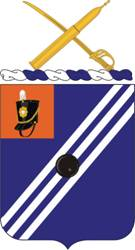
- Coat of arms
- Active: 1916-2015
- Country: (United States)
- Branch: United States Army
- Type: Field artillery
- Size: Battalion
- Part of: inactive
- Engagements: World War I World War II; Operation Enduring Freedom, Afghanistan; Operation Iraqi Freedom

Insignia
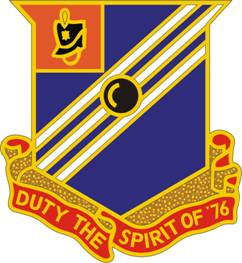
- Distinctive unit insignia

The 1st Battalion, 76th Field Artillery Regiment (1-76th FAR) is an inactive field artillery battalion of the United States Army. The battalion has been assigned to the 3rd Infantry Division, 7th Infantry Division, 2nd Infantry Brigade, and as a separate field artillery battalion. The battalion has participated in World War I, World War II, Operation Iraqi Freedom, and Operation Enduring Freedom. The battalion inactivated in 2015 as part of Army force reductions.

== History ==
To be developed.

The following history section is taken directly from the 3rd Infantry Division website.

1st Battalion, 76th Field Artillery, Duty, The Spirit of 1776, was constituted in the Regular Army on 1 July 1916 with horse-drawn French 75mm pack guns. Initially organized at Fort Ethan Allen, Vermont on 13 June 1917, it served with distinction in France with the 3d Division during World War I in the Champagne-Marne, Aisne-Marne, St Mihiel, Meuse-Argonne, and Champagne 1918 campaigns. The 76th Field Artillery Regiment was presented the Croix de Guerre with Gold Star by the Tenth French Army.

On 16 October 1939, the 76th Field Artillery was relieved of assignment to the 3d Division and reassigned to the 7th Division Artillery. Landing on Utah Beach, 11 August 1944, the 76th was attached to First Army and served during four campaigns throughout Northern France, the Rhineland, Ardennes-Alsace, and Central Europe. In April 1945, the battalion was attached to the 1st Infantry Division for its advance into Czechoslovakia, providing continuous fires on the enemy for 189 consecutive days. On 20 November 1945, it was cited for the Order of the Day of the Belgian Army for action in the Ardennes with the 30th Infantry Division. Upon return to the United States, the battalion was deactivated on 27 November 1945 at Camp Kilmer, New Jersey.

Beginning 1 August 1946, the 76th Field Artillery went through a series of activations and re-designations, and on 8 October 1954, as 1st Howitzer Battalion, 76th Artillery, it was assigned to the 2d Infantry Brigade, Fort Devens, Massachusetts. The Battalion participated in numerous field exercises and tests in support of the Brigade Group, ROTC, and National Guard units. On 13 September 1971, it was re-designated the 1st Battalion, 76th Field Artillery, assigned to the 3d Infantry Division, and activated in Germany. The battalion served as an integral part of NATO forces during the Cold War. The battalion was later deactivated on 16 February 1987 in Schweinfurt, Germany.

1st Battalion, 76th Field Artillery Regiment was reactivated and assigned to 4th Brigade Combat Team, 3d Infantry Division, at Fort Stewart, Georgia, on 24 June 2004. Within seven months, the "Patriots" Battalion deployed to Baghdad, Iraq, in support of Operation Iraqi Freedom III. During the year-long mission in support of the US Embassy, the "Patriots" conducted an average of 18 daily combat missions throughout the Multi National Forces-Iraq area of responsibility. The battalion totaled 3,849 combat patrols while under intense insurgent and terrorist pressure, traveled 530,138 miles on dangerous roads and delivered without loss or injury 61,183 diplomats, contractors, and senior military officers to their destinations across central Iraq.

The "Patriot" Battalion recently returned from a deployment in support of OIF V, where they partnered with Iraqi Army and Police forces throughout three Iraqi provinces. Their mentorship led the Iraqi government to reach total control of that province.

In 2015 the 1st Battalion, 76th Field Artillery Regiment reflagged as the 1st Battalion, 9th Field Artillery Regiment. They then deployed to the Joint Readiness Training Center, where they reclaimed the throne of the King of Battle by shooting counter fire missions so quickly that OPFOR was unable to use artillery or mortars for three days, a first for JRTC.

NOTE: This history section needs to be updated and properly cited. The unit website cited has been removed.

== Lineage and honors ==
=== Lineage ===
- Constituted 1 July 1916 in the Regular Army as Troops A and B, 18th Cavalry
- Organized 13 June 1917 at Fort Ethan Allen, Vermont
- Consolidated, converted, and redesignated 1 November 1917 as Battery A, 76th Field Artillery

(76th Field Artillery assigned 12 November 1917 to the 3d Division)

- Inactivated 28 April 1930 at Fort Francis E. Warren, Wyoming
- Activated 1 December 1938 at Fort Francis E. Warren, Wyoming

(76th Field Artillery relieved 16 October 1939 from assignment to the 3d Division; assigned 1 July 1940 to the 7th Division)

- Reorganized and redesignated 22 January 1941 as Battery A, 76th Field Artillery Battalion

(76th Field Artillery Battalion relieved 1 June 1941 from assignment to the 7th Division)

- Inactivated 27 November 1945 at Camp Kilmer, New Jersey
- Redesignated 1 August 1946 as Battery A, 76th Armored Field Artillery Battalion, and activated at Fort Knox, Kentucky
- Reorganized and redesignated 28 August 1953 as the 576th Armored Field Artillery Battery
- Inactivated 4 October 1954 at Fort Knox, Kentucky
- Redesignated 8 October 1954 as Battery A, 76th Field Artillery Battalion, and activated at Fort Devens, Massachusetts
- Reorganized and redesignated 15 February 1958 as Headquarters and Headquarters Battery, 1st Howitzer Battalion, 76th Artillery, and assigned to the 2d Infantry Brigade (organic elements concurrently constituted and activated)
- Battalion inactivated 25 March 1962 at Fort Devens, Massachusetts
- Relieved 20 April 1962 from assignment to the 2d Infantry Brigade
- Redesignated 1 September 1971 as the 1st Howitzer Battalion, 76th Field Artillery
- Redesignated 13 September 1972 as the 1st Battalion, 76th Field Artillery, assigned to the 3d Infantry Division, and activated in Germany
- Headquarters and Headquarters Battery, 1st Battalion, 76th Field Artillery, reorganized and redesignated 16 February 1987 as Battery A, 76th Field Artillery, and remained assigned to the 3d Infantry Division (remainder of battalion concurrently inactivated)
- Battery A, 76th Field Artillery inactivated 15 January 1992 in Germany
- Activated 16 August 1995 in Germany
- Inactivated 15 February 1996 in Germany and relieved from assignment to the 3d Infantry Division
- Redesignated 16 March 2004 as Headquarters and Headquarters Battery, 1st Battalion, 76th Field Artillery and assigned to the 4th Brigade Combat Team, 3d Infantry Division; Battalion concurrently activated at Fort Stewart, Georgia
- Redesignated 1 October 2005 as the 1st Battalion, 76th Field Artillery Regiment

=== Campaign participation credit ===
- World War I:
  - Champagne-Marne
  - Aisne-Marne
  - St. Mihiel
  - Meuse-Argonne
  - Champagne 1918
- World War II:
  - Northern France
  - Rhineland
  - Ardennes-Alsace
  - Central Europe
- War on terrorism: Campaigns to be determined

=== Decorations ===
- Valorous Unit Award, Streamer embroidered BAGHDAD 2005-2006
- Meritorious Unit Commendation (Army), Streamer embroidered IRAQ 2010-2011
- French Croix de Guerre with Gilt Star, World War I, Streamer embroidered CHAMPAGNE-MARNE and AISNE-MARNE
- Cited in the Order of the Day of the Belgian Army for action in the Ardennes

== Heraldry ==
=== Distinctive unit insignia ===
- 76th Field Artillery Regiment Distinctive Unit Insignia

=== Coat of arms ===
- 76th Field Artillery Regiment Coat of Arms
