= 1st NBC Battalion "Etruria" =

Inactive Italian Army CBRN defense unit

- 1° Battaglione NBC "Etruria"
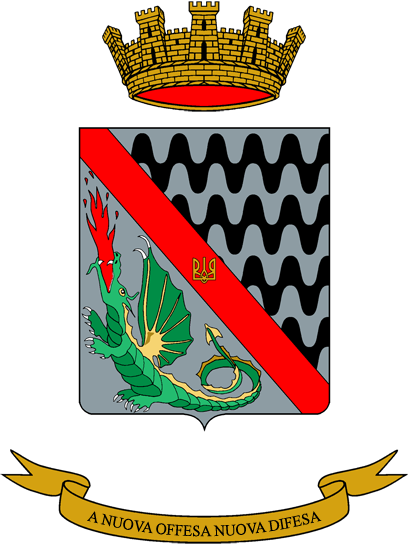
- Battalion coat of arms
- Active: 1 Jan. 1936 — 8 Sept. 1943; 1 Feb. 1976 — 1 May 1994
- Country: Italy
- Branch: Italian Army
- Role: NBC defense
- Garrison/HQ: Rieti
- Motto(s): "A nuova offesa nuova difesa"
- Anniversaries: 1 July 1923 - Constitution of the Chemical Service

Insignia
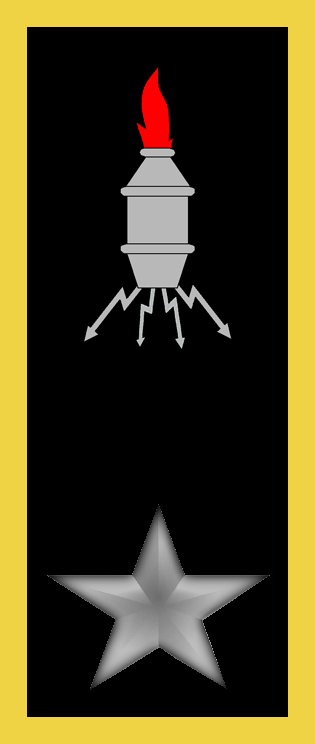
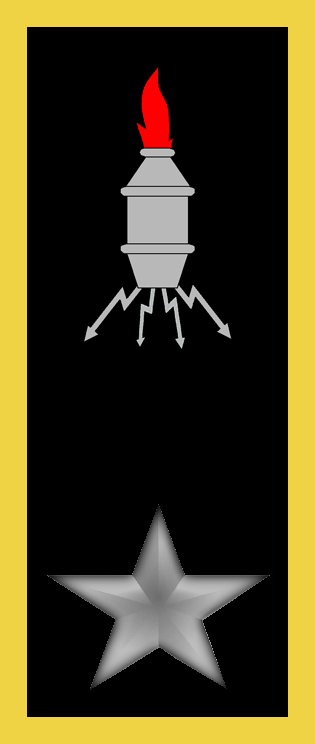
- gorget patches

The 1st NBC Battalion "Etruria" (Italian: 1° Battaglione NBC "Etruria") is an inactive unit of the Italian Army last based in Rieti. Throughout the Cold War the battalion was the army's only NBC defense unit. Formed in 1976 the battalion received the flag and traditions of the Chemical Regiment, which had been formed in 1936 and served in World War II. The battalion's anniversary falls on 1 July 1923, the day of the constitution of the Royal Italian Army's Chemical Service.

== History ==
On 1 July 1923, the Royal Italian Army constituted the Chemical Service, which began to experiment with chemical warfare agents and means of delivery. By 1934 the Chemical Service had grown to two battalions. The same year the Royal Italian Army formed a chemical company and a flamethrower platoon for each of its army corps, and a chemical unit was formed in Rome. In 1935-36, during the Second Italo-Ethiopian War, the Royal Italian Air Force used chemical weapons against Ethiopian troops and civilians. To expedite the army's capabilities to deploy chemical weapons the Royal Italian Army reorganized the Chemical Unit in Rome and used it to form the Chemical Regiment on 1 January 1936.

The regiment consisted of a command, a depot, the I Battalion with three chemical companies, and the II School Battalion with a chemical company, a Model 35 flamethrower company and a mod. 35 mortar company. On 21 October 1938, the regiment received its flag. In April 1940, the regiment changed composition and now consisted of a command, a depot, the I School Battalion, the II Mortar Battalion, the III Chemical Battalion, the IV Mixed Battalion with a two flamethrower companies and a nebulizers company. The Chemical Service's units were tasked with ensuring that troops and units were trained and prepared for chemical defense, as well as tasked to employ chemical weapons if so ordered by the army general staff.

=== World War II ===
After the outbreak of World War II the regiment's depot began to mobilize new units:

- II Flamethrower Battalion
- CI, CII, CIII, and CIV mortar battalions
- numerous chemical, fog generators, and flamethrower companies

By 6 November 1940 the Chemical Service consisted of:

- Chemical Regiment
- 10th Mixed Chemical Grouping (for the Army General Staff), with a command, a nebulizers battalion, a flamethrower battalion, and two mortar battalions
- a chemical grouping for each army, with a command, a chemical battalion, and a mortar battalion
- a mixed chemical battalion for the Army of the Po, with a command, a chemical company, and a mortar company
- twenty chemical companies, one attached to each army corps
- two chemical platoons, one based on Elba and one in Zadar

On 1 January 1942, the Chemical Regiment was reorganized and afterwards consisted of the following units:

- Chemical Regiment, in Rome
  - Command, command company, and depot, in Rome
  - I School Battalion, in Rome
  - II Chemical Battalion, in Alatri
  - III Flamethrower Battalion, in Sulmona
  - IV Chemical Mortar Battalion, in Civitavecchia

Throughout World War II the Italian military did not use chemical weapons, and the chemical unit's mortars were employed with conventional munitions, while many of the smaller chemical units were employed as smoke and fog generating units. In the evening of 8 September 1943, the Armistice of Cassibile, which ended hostilities between the Kingdom of Italy and the Anglo-American Allies, was announced by General Dwight D. Eisenhower on Radio Algiers and by Marshal Pietro Badoglio on Italian radio. Germany reacted by invading Italy and the Chemical Service, the Chemical Regiment, and the smaller units of the service in northern and central Italy were soon thereafter disbanded by the German forces.

=== Cold War ===
In 1952, the Italian Army's Artillery Inspectorate formed a Chemical Defense Office tasked with providing the Italian military with nuclear, biological, and chemical defense capabilities. On 1 October 1961, the office was elevated to ABC Defense Inspectorate. In October 1957, the existing Fog Generators and Flamethrowers Company was reorganized as Experimental ABC Company and assigned to the ABC Defense Inspectorate. In 1964, inspectorate and company changed their names from ABC to NBC. On 1 March 1967, the company was expanded to NBC Defense Battalion. The battalion was based in Rieti and consisted of a command, a command and services company, the 1st NBC Company (Experiments), and the 2nd NBC Company (Training). In 1969, the battalion added the 3rd NBC Company (Training).

During the 1975 army reform the army disbanded the regimental level and newly independent battalions were granted for the first time their own flags, respectively in the case of cavalry units, their own standard. On 15 September 1975, the NBC Defense Battalion was reorganized and now consisted of a command, a command and services company, and two specialized NBC companies. On 1 February 1976, the battalion was renamed 1st NBC Battalion "Etruria". On the same day the NBC Defense Inspectorate was merged into the Artillery Inspectorate, which was renamed Artillery and NBC-defense Inspectorate. The merged inspectorate contained an NBC Office, which controlled the 1st NBC Battalion "Etruria". The battalion acted as the army's central training institution for the army's NBC defense personnel, which after training was assigned to operational units. On 12 November 1976, the President of the Italian Republic Giovanni Leone assigned with decree 846 the flag and traditions of the Chemical Regiment to the battalion.

On 1 May 1994, the Italian military's Joint Forces Nuclear, Biological and Chemical Defence School moved to Rieti and merged with the 1st NBC Battalion "Etruria". In 1995, the Italian Army decided to unite its operational NBC Defense personnel in one unit and, on 25 July 1996, 7th Self-propelled Field Artillery Regiment "Cremona" in Civitavecchia was transferred from the Mechanized Brigade "Granatieri di Sardegna" to the NBC-defense and Artillery Command of the Central Military Region and began to conversion to a CBRN defense unit. On 31 December 1998, the regiment's conversion was completed and the regiment was renamed 7th NBC Defense Regiment "Cremona".
