= 1st Armoured-Mechanized Battalion "Sokolovi" =

1st Armoured-Mechanized Battalion "Sokolovi": 1. oklopno-mehanizirana bojna "Sokolovi"
- Active: 2007-Present
- Country: Croatia
- Branch: Croatian Army
- Role: Mechanized infantry
- Part of: Guards Armoured Mechanized Brigade
- Garrison/HQ: Našice
- Nicknames: Falcons; Sokolovi
- Anniversaries: October 5th

The 1st Armoured-Mechanized Battalion "Sokolovi" (Lit: Falcons) (Croatian: 1. oklopno-mehanizirana bojna "Sokolovi") is one of two mechanized infantry battalions within the Guards Armoured Mechanized Brigade (GOMBR) of the Croatian Army.

== History ==
Established in its current form after the reorganisation of the Armed Forces of Croatia in 2007, the 1st Armoured-Mechanized Battalion was created with the merging of the 3rd Guards Brigade "Kune" and 5th Guards Brigade "Sokolovi".

== Organisation ==
Garrisoned at 132nd Brigade barracks in Našice, the battalion is composed of three tracked mechanized infantry companies, a command company, a logistics company and a fire support company.

== Operations ==
In the past, members of the 1st Armoured-Mechanized Battalion have been deployed in support of the NATO ISAF mission in Afghanistan as part of the Croatian Contingent (HRVCON), and to the United Nations Disengagement Observer Force (UNDOF) mission in the Golan Heights.

== Equipment ==
The 1st Mechanized Battalion is equipped with armoured vehicles and various infantry weapons of Yugoslav origin.

- M-80 infantry fighting vehicle's (being replaced with M2 Bradley A2 ODS SA infantry fighting vehicle's)
- BOV Armoured Personnel Carrier
- POLO M-83 anti-tank vehicle armed with 6 x AT-3 missiles
- Mercedes Benz G-Wagen
- 120mm M75 Light Mortar
