= 1st Chemical, Biological, Radiological and Nuclear Defense Battalion =

Special force in the Brazilian Army

The 1st Chemical, Biological, Radiological and Nuclear Defense Battalion (1.º Batalhão de Defesa Química, Biológica, Radiológica e Nuclear; formerly the Companhia de Defesa Química, Biológica e Nuclear and 1º Pelotão de Defesa Química, Biológica e Nuclear (1º PDQBN)) is a Special force of the Brazilian Army responsible for chemical, biological and nuclear defense. Its history dates back to 1953 when he Chemical Warfare Company was established. On 31 December 1987 this company was dissolved and the Chemical Biological and Nuclear Company formed, based in Rio de Janeiro. This company became the 1st Chemical, Biological, Radiological and Nuclear Defense Battalion in 2012.

The company assists and advises the preparation and employment of troops and resources in environmental NBC (nuclear, biological and chemical). Their mission is survey, identify, detect and monitor pollution levels and, where appropriate, decontaminate personnel, equipment and areas under the influence of NBC agents.
