= 1st Brigade Combat Team, 1st Armored Division =

One of three basic maneuver units of the 1st Armored Division, US Army

1st Armored Brigade Combat Team of the 1st Armored Division
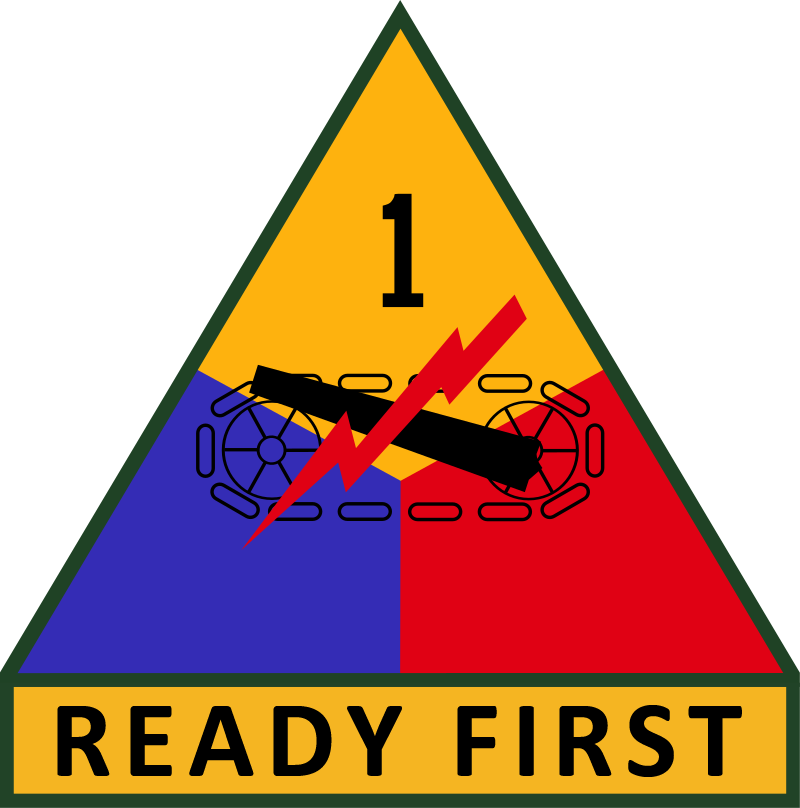
- Insignia of the 1st Armored Brigade Combat Team, 1st Armored Division of the United States Army
- Country: USA
- Branch: Regular Army
- Type: Armored brigade combat team
- Part of: 1st Armored Division
- Garrison/HQ: Fort Bliss
- Nickname: "Ready First"
- Engagements: World War II; Operation Iraqi Freedom

Commanders
- Current commander: Colonel Bryan Frizzelle

The 1st Armored Brigade Combat Team, 1st Armored Division is an Armored Brigade Combat Team of the United States Army, of the 1st Armored Division, stationed at Fort Bliss, TX.

First organized in 1942, as Combat Command A, 1st Armored Division, the unit has fought in North Africa and Italy in World War II, as well as 4 tours in Operation Iraqi Freedom. As the 3rd Constabulary Regiment, the brigade conducted stability operations in Germany after World War II. After service at Fort Hood and in Germany during the Cold War, the brigade conducted three peacekeeping rotations in the Balkans (Bosnia, Macedonia and Kosovo).

== Organization ==
The current organization of the brigade, as of November 2019, is as follows;

- 1st Armored Brigade Headquarters and Headquarters Company
- 6th Squadron, 1st Cavalry Regiment (6-1 CAV)
- 2nd Battalion, 37th Armor Regiment (2-37 AR)
- 4th Battalion, 70th Armor Regiment (4-70 AR)
- 1st Battalion, 36th Infantry Regiment (1-36 INF)
- 2nd Battalion, 3rd Field Artillery Regiment (2-3 FAR)
- 16th Engineer Battalion (16 ENG)
- 501st Brigade Support Battalion (501 BSB)

== Lineage ==
- Organized in the Regular Army at Fort Knox, Kentucky, as Headquarters and Headquarters Detachment, Combat Command A, 1st Armored Division on January 1, 1942.
- Reorganized and redesignated as Headquarters and Headquarters Company, Combat Command A, 1st Armored Division on July 20, 1944.
- Converted and redesignated on May 1, 1946, as Headquarters and Headquarters Troop, 3d Constabulary Regiment, and relieved from assignment to the 1st Armored Division
- The unit was Inactivated September 20, 1947 in Germany.
- Converted and redesignated 27 February 1951 as Headquarters and Headquarters Company, Combat Command A, 1st Armored Division
- Activated 7 March 1951 at Fort Hood, Texas
- Reorganized and redesignated 3 February 1962 as Headquarters and Headquarters Company, 1st Brigade, 1st Armored Division in Vilseck, West Germany. While stationed in Vilseck, the Brigade deployed to Operation Desert Storm / Operation Desert Shield, in Kuwait / Iraq; Operation Allied Force/ Operation Joint Guardian in the Balkans, and then to Operation Iraqi Freedom 2x and Operation Enduring Freedom 1x.
- Headquarters, 1st Brigade, 1st Armored Division, reorganized and redesignated 16 September 2008 as Headquarters, 1st Brigade Combat Team, 1st Armored Division (Headquarters Company, 1st Brigade, 1st Armored Division, concurrently reorganized and redesignated as Special Troops Battalion, 1st Brigade Combat Team, 1st Armored Division) Ft. Bliss, Texas.
- Headquarters, 1st Brigade Combat Team, 1st Armored Division, consolidated 16 January 2011 with Special Troops Battalion, 1st Brigade Combat Team, 1st Armored Division, and consolidated unit concurrently reorganized and redesignated as Headquarters and Headquarters Company, 1st Brigade Combat Team, 1st Armored Division

== Campaign participation credit ==
The 1st Armored Brigade Combat Team, 1st Armored Division participated in the World War II campaigns of: Tunisia; Naples-Foggia; Anzio; Rome-Arno; North Apennines; and Po Valley.

In the War On Terrorism, the brigade has participated in Operation Iraqi Freedom, Operation Enduring Freedom, and Operation Freedom Sentinel.

== Decorations ==
- Presidential Unit Citation (Army), Streamer embroidered IRAQ 2004
- Meritorious Unit Commendation (Army), Streamer embroidered IRAQ 2009-2010
- Navy Unit Commendation, Streamer embroidered ANBAR PROVINCE 2006-2007
- Army Superior Unit Award, Streamer embroidered 1995-1996

Headquarters Company additionally entitled to:

- Meritorious Unit Commendation (Army), Streamer embroidered IRAQ NOV 2009-NOV 2010
