= 1st Anti-Aircraft Artillery (Automatic Weapons) Battalion =

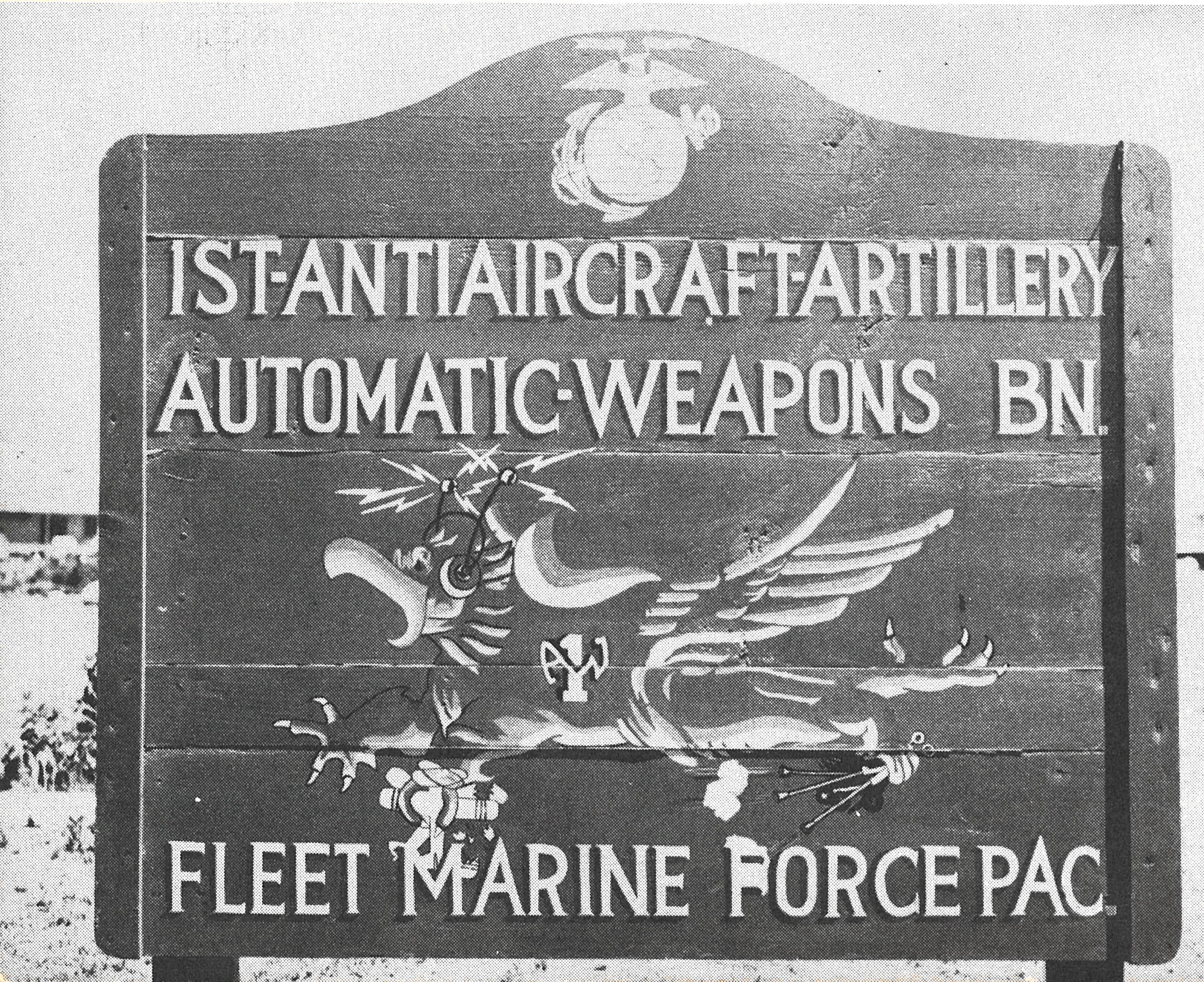
- Active: Oct 1, 1950 – Jun 15, 1959
- Country: United States of America
- Branch: United States Marine Corps
- Type: Air Defense
- Size: 275 Personnel
- Part of: Decommissioned

Commanders
- Current commander: N/A

1st Anti-Aircraft Artillery (Automatic Weapons) Battalion (1st AAA (AW) Bn) was a short lived United States Marine Corps air defense unit that was originally commissioned during the Korean War. The battalion moved to Marine Corps Base 29 Palms, California in 1953 and continued to support exercises across the Southwestern United States until it was decommissioned in June 1959. Since then, no other Marine Corps battalion has carried the lineage and honors of the 1st AAA(AW) Bn.

== History ==
The 1st AAA (AW) Battalion was commissioned on October 1, 1950, at Marine Corps Base Camp Pendleton, California. More than 90% of the original Marines assigned to the battalion were reservists called to active duty during the Korean War. Many of these reservists had a great deal of experience having served in various Marine Defense Battalions during World War II. At the time it was commissioned, it was thought that the unit was going to be deployed to South Korea immediately upon becoming ready for combat however that never came to be. After conducting a simulated amphibious landing on San Clemente Island, the battalion was certified as ready to conduct amphibious operations within three months of commissioning. When first commissioned, the battalion used the towed, M-55 quad-.50 machine guns and the towed, 40mm Bofors cannon. By April 1951 the battalion was at full strength and participated in firing exercises at Camp Irwin.

In the summer of 1953, 1st AAA (AW) Battalion became the first unit to move to Marine Corps Training Center Twentynine Palms, California. The training areas at Twentynine Palms, California provided the additional maneuver space and airspace the battalion required to train to its core tasks. By May 1954, the battalion had traded in its 40mm Bofors cannons for M42 Dusters and mounted the M-55 quad-.50 machine guns on the back of an M16 Multiple Gun Motor Carriage to become a fully self-propelled air defense battalion. Because of the battalion's maneuverability and firepower it also provided a ground support role on top of its primary antiaircraft Artillery mission.

In 1959, the Marine Corps reduced its end strength from 200,000 to 175,000 and as part of that reduction the 1st AA(AW) Battalion was designated for decommissioning. On June 5, 1959, the battalion cased its colors during a parade at MCB Twentynine Palms. The battalion was administratively decommissioned ten days later on June 15, 1959.

== Major End Items ==
- M55 machine gun trailer mount – an American quadruple .50 caliber machine gun system based on the M45 Quadmount (1950–1954)
- M16 Multiple Gun Motor Carriage – an anti-aircraft variant of the American M3 Half-track (1954–1959)
- Towed Bofors 40mm Guns – (1950–1954)
- M42 Duster – American armored light air-defense gun built on the chassis of an M41 Walker Bulldog (1954–1959)

== Commanding Officers ==
- LtCol Joseph L. Winecoff – October 1, 1950 – October 18, 1950
- Maj Gerald J. Clancy Jr. – October 19, 1950 – October 30, 1950
- LtCol John H. Gill – October 31, 1950 – March 10, 1952
- Maj George Anderson – March 11, 1952 – July 27, 1952
- LtCol Harvey B. Atkins – July 28, 1952 – October 28, 1952
- LtCol Eugene V. Boro – October 29, 1952 – April 13, 1955
- LtCol Carl E. Walker – April 14, 1955 – December 11, 1955
- LtCol Lawrence R. Cloern – December 12, 1955 – July 11, 1956
- LtCol Raymond L. Valente – July 12, 1956 – March 15, 1957
- LtCol Warren F. Lloyd – March 16, 1957 – July 16, 1958
- LtCol Herbert E. L. Zastrow – July 17, 1958 – Unknown
- Maj Leo G. Lewis – Unknown – May 1, 1959
- Capt Cyril Wadzita – May 2, 1959 – Jun 15, 1959

== Unit awards ==
Since the beginning of World War II, the United States military has honored various units for extraordinary heroism or outstanding non-combat service. This information is compiled by the United States Marine Corps History Division and is certified by the Commandant of the Marine Corps. The 1st AAA (AW) Battalion has been presented with the following awards:

| Streamer | Award | Year(s) | Additional Info |
|---|---|---|---|
| A red streamer with a horizontal gold stripe and three bronze stars in the center | National Defense Service Streamer | 1951–1954 | Korean War |

== See also ==
- List of United States Marine Corps aviation support squadrons
- History of ground based air defense in the United States Marine Corps
