= 1st Parachute Battalion (Hungary) =

Unit of the Royal Hungarian Army

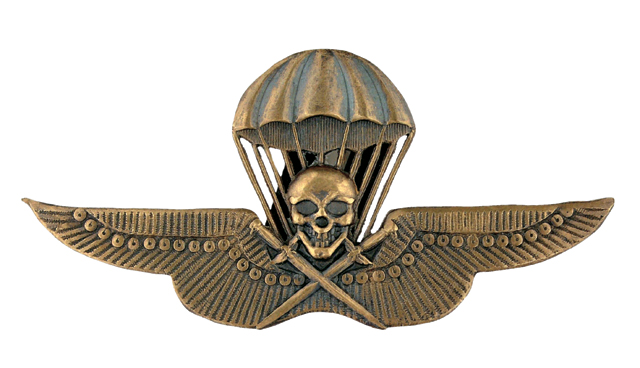
- Royal Hungarian army parachutist badge
- Active: 1 October 1939 - 1945
- Country: Kingdom of Hungary
- Branch: Royal Hungarian Army
- Type: Paratrooper
- Size: Battalion
- Engagements: World War II: Invasion of Yugoslavia; Budapest Offensive; Siege of Budapest

Commanders
- Notable commanders: Captain Vitéz Bertalan

The 1st Parachute Battalion was a unit of the Royal Hungarian Army that was formed on 1 October 1939. It participated in the Axis invasion of Yugoslavia during World War II. During the Siege of Budapest, the battalion suffered a 40% casualty rate and lost another 10% of its soldiers during the withdrawal.
