= 1st Intelligence Battalion (United States) =

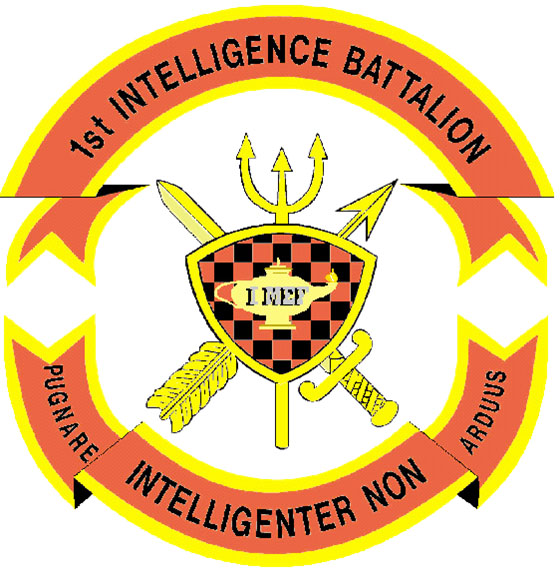
- 1st Intel's emblem
- Active: 2 October 1989 – present
- Country: United States
- Allegiance: United States of America
- Branch: United States Marine Corps
- Role: Military intelligence
- Part of: I Marine Expeditionary Force
- Garrison/HQ: Marine Corps Base Camp Pendleton
- Motto: "Pugnare Intelligenter Non Arduus"
- Engagements: Operation Desert Storm; Operation Restore Hope; Operation Iraqi Freedom; Operation Enduring Freedom * 2003 invasion of Iraq

1st Intelligence Battalion (1st Intel) is a Marine Corps Intelligence, military intelligence, and counter intelligence unit based at Marine Corps Base Camp Pendleton. The battalion provides the I Marine Expeditionary Force with intelligence products and analysis.

== Mission ==
Responsible for planning, directing, collecting, processing, producing and disseminating intelligence, and providing counterintelligence support to the Marine Expeditionary Force (MEF), MEF Major Subordinate Commands, subordinate Marine Air Ground Task Forces (MAGTF), and other commands as directed.

== Subordinate units ==
- Headquarters Company
- Production and Analysis Company
- Counterintelligence/Human Intelligence Company
- Production and Analysis Support Company
- Counterintelligence/Human Intelligence Support Company

== Unit awards ==
- Presidential Unit Citation
- Joint Meritorious Unit Citation
- Navy Unit Commendation
- Meritorious Unit Commendation
- National Defense Service Medal
- Armed Forces Expeditionary Medal
- Southwest Asia Service Medal
- Global War on Terrorism Expeditionary Medal

== Unit awards ==
A unit citation or commendation is an award bestowed upon an organization for the action cited. Members of the unit who participated in said actions are allowed to wear on their uniforms the awarded unit citation. 1st Intelligence Battalion has been presented with the following awards:

Ribbon	Unit Award
	Presidential Unit Citation
	Joint Meritorious Unit Award
	Navy Unit Commendation
	Meritorious Unit Commendation
	National Defense Service Medal with one Bronze Star
	Armed Forces Expeditionary Medal
	Southwest Asia Service Medal
	Iraq Campaign Medal
	Global War on Terrorism Expeditionary Medal
	Global War on Terrorism Service Medal
