= 1st Military Intelligence Battalion =

U.S. Army unit

1st Military Intelligence Battalion (Aerial Exploitation)
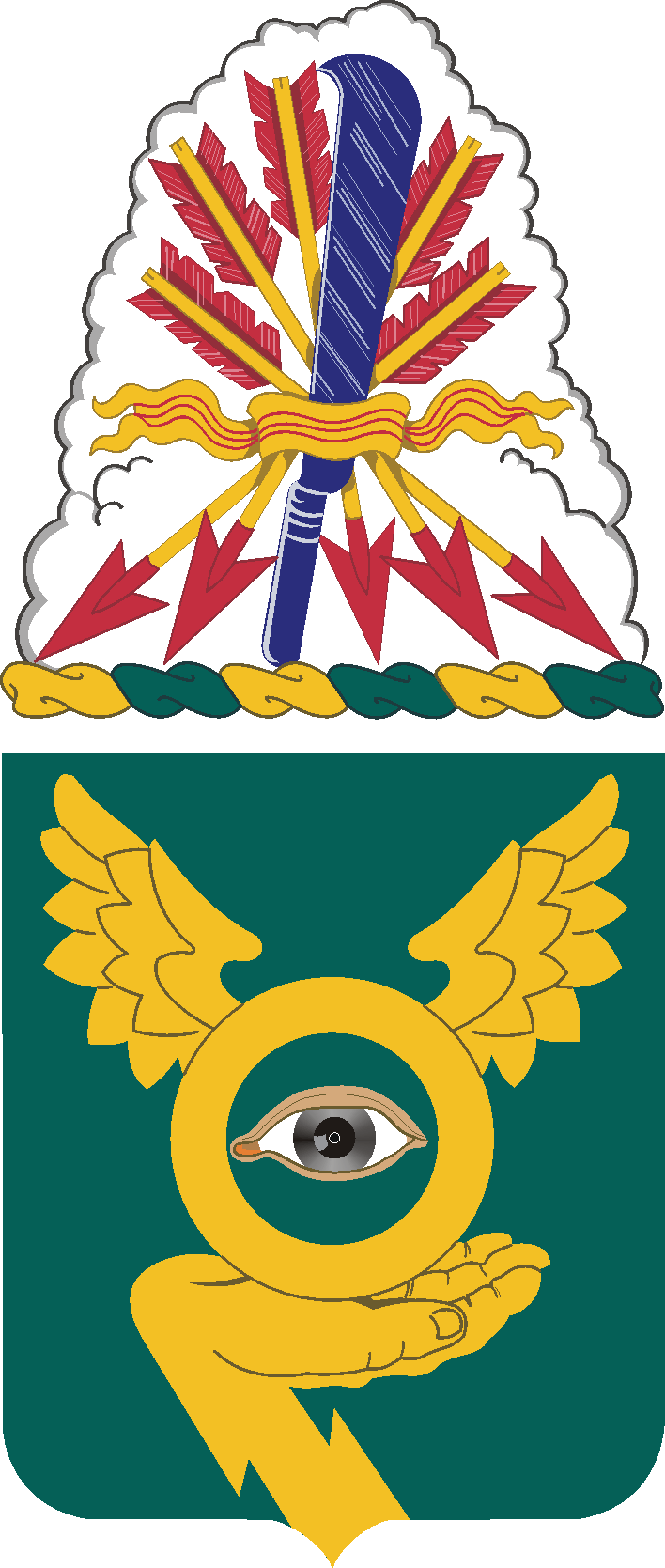
- 1st Military Intelligence coat of arms
- Active: 1957–1982; 1984–present
- Country: United States of America
- Branch: United States Army
- Type: Intelligence battalion
- Role: Aerial Signals Information Acquisition
- Part of: 66th Military Intelligence Brigade, Regular Army
- Garrison/HQ: Lucius D. Clay Kaserne
- Nickname: Flying Eye Battalion (Special Designation)
- Motto: Infomare Laboramus ("We labor to inform")
- Equipment: RC-12 Guardrail; RQ-5 Hunter
- Engagements: Korean War; Vietnam War; Operation Desert Storm; Operation Iraqi Freedom III-IV and V-VI; Operation Enduring Freedom VI
- Decorations: Presidential Unit Citation; Meritorious Unit Commendation; Superior Unit Award; Vietnam Cross of Gallantry

Insignia
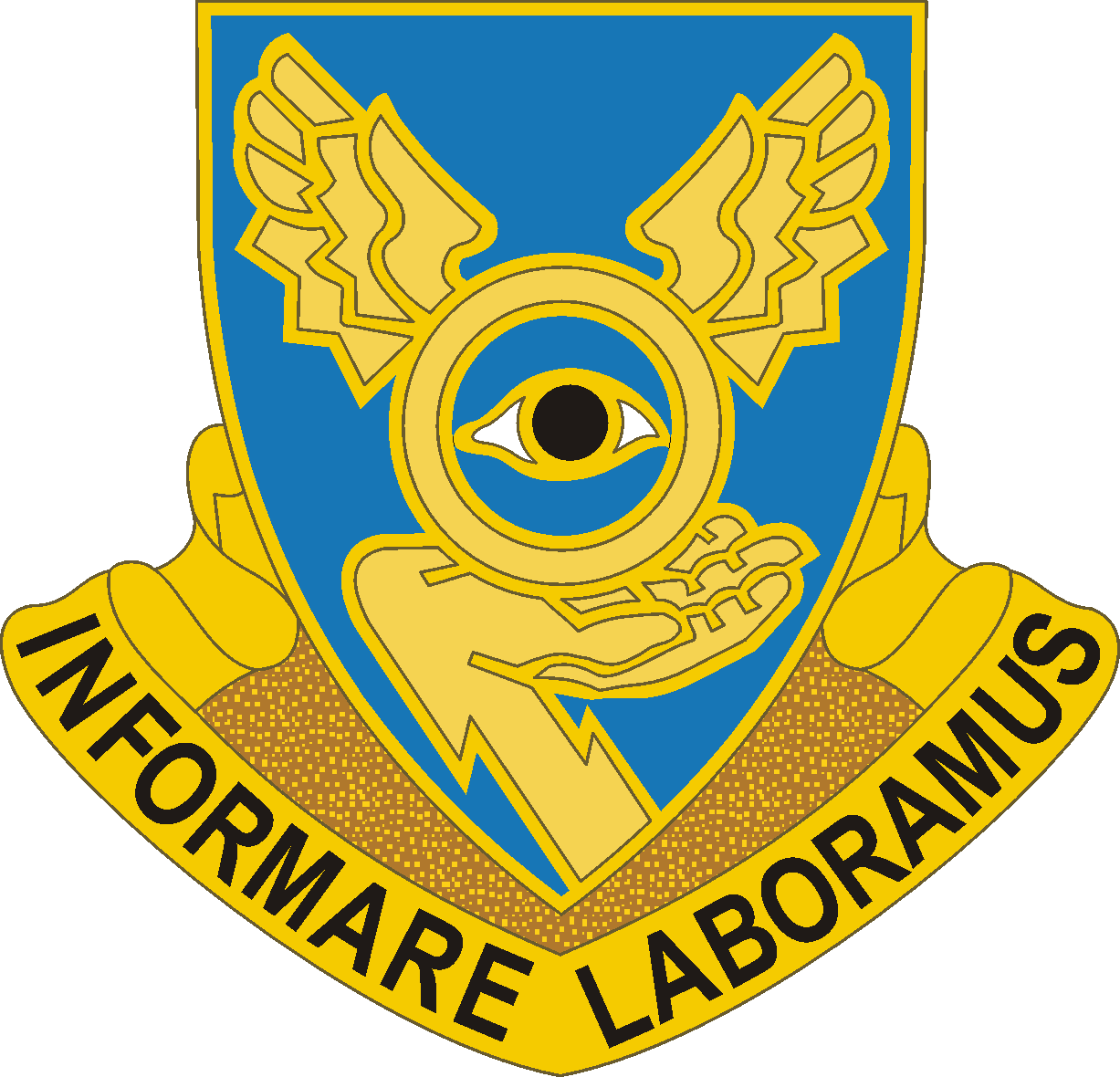
- Distinctive Unit Insignia

1st Military Intelligence Battalion (Aerial Exploitation), nicknamed the "Flying Eye Battalion", is a unit of the United States Army which specializes in the acquisition of aerial signals information in direct support of the 66th Military Intelligence Brigade. 1st MI Battalion (AE) is currently headquartered at Lucius D. Clay Kaserne in Germany.

== Battalion history ==
The unit was originally formed on 14 December 1956 as Headquarters and Headquarters Detachment, 1st Air Reconnaissance Support Battalion, and formally activated 1 February 1957 at Fort Polk, Louisiana. It was reorganized and redesignated 1 May 1959 as Company A, 196th Aerial Photo Interpretation Detachment at Fort Bragg, North Carolina. Then on 20 March 1962 it was converted and redesignated the 1st Military Intelligence Battalion (Air Reconnaissance Support). In October 1962 the 1st Military Intelligence Battalion (ARS) was instrumental in identifying Russian missile activity from clear photographic evidence produced from Air Force U-2 Spy Planes. Upon its return from Vietnam in 1973, 1st MI was assigned to Fort Bragg, North Carolina and eventually inactivated 15 July 1982. Reactivated 14 January 1984 in Germany as V Corps' aerial exploitation battalion, 1st MI is currently assigned to the 66th Military Intelligence Brigade out of Lucius D. Clay Kaserne, Wiesbaden, Germany, and supported Operation Enduring Freedom in Afghanistan.

1st MI Battalion has served in

- the Korean War, as Company A, 196th Aerial Photo Interpretation Detachment, which was formed 10 July 1945 at Fort Jackson, South Carolina
- the Vietnam War, as 1st Military Intelligence Battalion (ARS) (MIBARS)
- Operation Desert Storm
- Operation Joint Endeavor
- Operation Joint Guard
- Operation Joint Forge
- Operation Joint Guardian
- Operation Noble Anvil
- Operation Iraqi Freedom
- Operation Enduring Freedom

== Current unit organization ==
The battalion has undergone various reorganizations. Currently it comprises four companies:

- Headquarters and Headquarters Service Company – Runs battalion command and control and provides logistics support
- Company A – Provides aerial images through the use of the Hunter Unmanned Aerial Vehicle
- Company B – Produces SIGINT collection and Aerial Electronic Warfare with the Guardrail Common Sensor
- Company C – Conducts analysis and dissemination of SIGINT

== Vietnam unit organization ==
The unit served in Vietnam from 23 December 1965 from Ft. Bragg and departed Vietnam on 19 April 1971 to return to Ft. Bragg, as 1st Military Intelligence Battalion (Air Reconnaissance Support)(MIBARS). Detachments were stationed in multiple locations during the battalion's deployment. Each detachment consisted of an operations/imagery interpretation section, a reproduction section and a supply and maintenance section.

- Headquarters and Headquarters Company was based in Saigon at Muscara Compound. It included an aviation platoon ("The Good Guys").
- Detachment A was based at Biên Hòa and supported III Corps operations.
- Detachment B was based at Da Nang and supported I Corps operations.
- Detachment C was based at Cần Thơ and supported IV Corps operations.
- Detachment D was based at Nha Trang and supported II Corps operations.
- 45th Military Intelligence Detachment was assigned to 1st MI Battalion in 1968 and was based in Phu Bai. It was eventually organized as Detachment E and supported operations in I Corps.

== Decorations ==
The following decorations have been awarded to the 1st Military Intelligence Battalion:

- Presidential Unit Citation (Air Force) for Southeast Asia 1966–1967
- Meritorious Unit Commendation (Army) for Vietnam 1965–1966
- Meritorious Unit Commendation (Army) for Vietnam 1966–1967
- Meritorious Unit Commendation (Army) for Vietnam 1967–1968
- Meritorious Unit Commendation (Army) for Vietnam 1969–1970
- Meritorious Unit Commendation (Army) for Vietnam 1970–1972
- Meritorious Unit Commendation (Army) for Iraq 2005–2006
- Meritorious Unit Commendation (Army) for Afghanistan 2007–2009
- Army Superior Unit Award for 1995–1996
- Army Superior Unit Award for 1999–2003
- Republic of Vietnam Cross of Gallantry with Gold Star for Vietnam 1965–1971

Company A is additionally entitled to:

- Meritorious Unit Commendation (Army) for Korea 1950–1952
- Meritorious Unit Commendation (Army) for Korea 1953
- Republic of Korea Presidential Unit Citation for Korea 1950–1952

== Notes ==
Citations

References cited

This article incorporates public domain material from 1st Military Intelligence Battalion Lineage and Honors. United States Army Center of Military History.

- "Lineage and Honors Information". 1st Military Intelligence Battalion. U.S. Army Center of Military History. Archived from the original on 25 June 2012.
- "Special Designations". United States Army Center of Military History. 21 April 2010. Archived from the original on 9 June 2010.
- Finnegan, John Patrick and Romana Danysh (1998). Military Intelligence. Washington, DC: U.S. Army Center of Military History. ISBN 978-0-16-048828-3.
- Stanton, Shelby L (1987). Vietnam Order of Battle. New York, New York: Galahad Books. ISBN 978-0-671-08159-1.
