= List of field artillery regiments of the United States =

This list attempts to list the field artillery regiments of the United States Army and United States Marine Corps. As the U.S. Army field artillery evolved, regimental lineages of the artillery, including air defense artillery, coast artillery, and field artillery were intermingled. This list is only concerned with field artillery. Where possible, the active components of the regiments are listed. Inactive units are listed by regiment, and their elements are not listed.

== U.S. Army ==
=== Current Active Component ===
- 1st Field Artillery Regiment
  - 4th Battalion is the cannon battalion assigned to the 3rd Armored BCT, 1st Armored Division, stationed at Fort Bliss, Texas
- 2nd Field Artillery Regiment
  - 2nd Battalion is a training support battalion assigned to the 428th Field Artillery Brigade, stationed at Fort Sill, Oklahoma
- 3rd Field Artillery Regiment
  - 2nd Battalion is the cannon battalion assigned to the 1st Armored BCT, 1st Armored Division, stationed at Fort Bliss, Texas
  - 5th Battalion is a rocket battalion assigned to the 17th Field Artillery Brigade, stationed at Joint Base Lewis-McChord, Washington
- 4th Field Artillery Regiment
  - 2nd Battalion is a rocket battalion assigned to the 75th Field Artillery Brigade, stationed at Fort Sill, Oklahoma
- 5th Field Artillery Regiment
  - 1st Battalion is the cannon battalion assigned to the 1st Armored BCT, 1st Infantry Division, stationed at Fort Riley, Kansas
- 6th Field Artillery Regiment
  - 1st Battalion is a rocket battalion assigned to the 41st Field Artillery Brigade, stationed at Grafenwoehr Training Area in Germany
  - 3rd Battalion is the cannon battalion assigned to the 1st Infantry BCT, 10th Mountain Division, stationed at Fort Drum, NY
- 7th Field Artillery Regiment
  - 1st Battalion is the cannon battalion assigned to the 2nd Armored BCT, 1st Infantry Division, stationed at Fort Riley, Kansas
  - 3rd Battalion is the cannon battalion assigned to the 3rd Brigade Combat Team, 25th Infantry Division, stationed at Schofield Barracks, Hawaii
- 8th Field Artillery Regiment
  - 2nd Battalion is the cannon battalion assigned to the 1st Brigade Combat Team, 11th Airborne Division, stationed at Fort Wainwright, Alaska.
- 9th Field Artillery Regiment
  - 1st Battalion is the cannon battalion assigned to the 2nd Brigade Combat Team, 3rd Infantry Division, stationed at Fort Stewart, Georgia
- 11th Field Artillery Regiment
  - 2nd Battalion is the cannon battalion assigned to the 2nd Brigade Combat Team, 25th Infantry Division, stationed at Schofield Barracks, Hawaii
- 12th Field Artillery Regiment
  - 2nd Battalion is the cannon battalion assigned to 1st Stryker BCT, 4th Infantry Division, stationed at Fort Carson, Colorado
- 13th Field Artillery Regiment
  - 3rd Battalion is a rocket battalion assigned to the 75th Field Artillery Brigade, stationed at Fort Sill, Oklahoma
- 14th Field Artillery Regiment
  - 1st Battalion is a rocket battalion assigned to the 75th Field Artillery Brigade, stationed at Fort Sill, Oklahoma
- 15th Field Artillery Regiment
  - 2nd Battalion is the cannon battalion assigned to the 2nd Infantry BCT, 10th Mountain Division, stationed at Fort Drum, New York
- 16th Field Artillery Regiment
  - 3rd Battalion is the cannon battalion assigned to the 2nd Armored BCT, 1st Cavalry Division, stationed at Fort Cavazos, Texas
- 17th Field Artillery Regiment
  - 2nd Battalion is the cannon battalion assigned to the 2nd Stryker BCT, 2nd Infantry Division, stationed at Joint Base Lewis-McChord, Washington
- 18th Field Artillery Regiment
  - 2nd Battalion is a rocket battalion assigned to the 75th Field Artillery Brigade, stationed at Fort Sill, Oklahoma
- 19th Field Artillery Regiment
  - 1st Battalion is a basic combat training battalion, assigned to the 434th Field Artillery Brigade, stationed at Fort Sill, Oklahoma
- 20th Field Artillery Regiment (United States)
  - 2nd Battalion is a rocket battalion assigned to the 75th Field Artillery Brigade, stationed at Fort Sill, Oklahoma
- 25th Field Artillery Regiment
  - 5th Battalion is the cannon battalion assigned to the 3rd Infantry BCT, 10th Mountain Division, stationed at Fort Johnson, Louisiana
- 27th Field Artillery Regiment
  - 3rd Battalion is a rocket battalion assigned to the 18th Field Artillery Brigade, stationed at Fort Bragg, North Carolina
  - 4th Battalion is the cannon battalion assigned to the 2nd Armored BCT, 1st Armored Division, stationed at Fort Bliss, Texas
- 29th Field Artillery Regiment
  - 3rd Battalion is the cannon battalion assigned to the 3rd Armored BCT, 4th Infantry Division, stationed at Fort Carson, Colorado
- 30th Field Artillery Regiment (United States)
  - 1st Battalion is a training battalion assigned to the 428th Field Artillery Brigade, stationed at Fort Sill, Oklahoma
- 31st Field Artillery Regiment
  - 1st Battalion is a basic combat training battalion, assigned to the 434th Field Artillery Brigade, stationed at Fort Sill, Oklahoma
- 32nd Field Artillery Regiment
  - 2nd Battalion is the cannon battalion assigned to the 1st Infantry BCT, 101st Airborne Division, stationed at Fort Campbell, Kentucky
- 37th Field Artillery Regiment
  - 1st Battalion is the cannon battalion assigned to the 1st Stryker BCT, 2nd Infantry Division, stationed at Joint Base Lewis-McChord, Washington
  - 6th Battalion is a rocket battalion assigned to the 210th Field Artillery Brigade, stationed at Camp Casey, Korea
- 38th Field Artillery Regiment
  - 1st Battalion is a rocket battalion assigned to the 210th Field Artillery Brigade, stationed at Camp Casey, Korea
- 40th Field Artillery Regiment
  - 1st Battalion is a basic combat training battalion, assigned to the 434th Field Artillery Brigade, stationed at Fort Sill, Oklahoma
- 41st Field Artillery Regiment
  - 1st Battalion is the cannon battalion assigned to the 1st Armored BCT, 3rd Infantry Division, stationed at Fort Stewart, Georgia
- 77th Field Artillery Regiment
  - 1st Battalion is a rocket battalion assigned to the 41st Field Artillery Brigade, stationed at Grafenwoehr Training Area in Germany
  - 2nd Battalion is the cannon battalion assigned to the 2nd Infantry BCT, 4th Infantry Division, stationed at Fort Carson, Colorado
- 78th Field Artillery Regiment
  - 1st Battalion is a training battalion assigned to the 428th Field Artillery Brigade, stationed at Fort Sill, Oklahoma
- 79th Field Artillery Regiment
  - 1st Battalion is a basic combat training battalion, assigned to the 434th Field Artillery Brigade, stationed at Fort Sill, Oklahoma
- 82nd Field Artillery Regiment
  - 1st Battalion is the cannon battalion assigned to the 1st Armored BCT, 1st Cavalry Division, stationed at Fort Cavazos, Texas
  - 2nd Battalion is the cannon battalion assigned to the 3rd Armored BCT, 1st Cavalry Division, stationed at Fort Cavazos, Texas
- 94th Field Artillery Regiment
  - 1st Battalion is a rocket battalion assigned to the 17th Field Artillery Brigade, stationed at Joint Base Lewis-McChord, Washington
- 319th Field Artillery Regiment
  - 1st Battalion is the cannon battalion assigned to the 3rd Airborne BCT, 82nd Airborne Division, stationed at Fort Bragg, NC
  - 2nd Battalion is the cannon battalion assigned to the 2nd Airborne BCT, 82nd Airborne Division, stationed at Fort Bragg, NC
  - 3rd Battalion is the cannon battalion assigned to the 1st Airborne BCT, 82nd Airborne Division, stationed at Fort Bragg, NC
  - 4th Battalion is the cannon battalion assigned to the 173rd Airborne Brigade, stationed at Grafenwöhr Training Area, Germany
- 320th Field Artillery Regiment
  - 1st Battalion is the cannon battalion assigned to the 2nd Infantry BCT, 101st Airborne Division, stationed at Fort Campbell, Kentucky
  - 3rd Battalion is the cannon battalion assigned to the 3rd Infantry BCT, 101st Airborne Division, stationed at Fort Campbell, Kentucky
- 321st Field Artillery Regiment
  - 3rd Battalion is a rocket battalion assigned to the 18th Field Artillery Brigade, stationed at Fort Bragg, North Carolina
- 377th Field Artillery Regiment
  - 2nd Battalion is the cannon battalion assigned to the 2nd Infantry Brigade Combat Team (Airborne), 11th Airborne Division, stationed at Joint Base Elmendorf-Richardson, Alaska

=== Current Reserve Component ===
- 101st Field Artillery Regiment
  - 1st Battalion is the cannon battalion assigned to the 86th Infantry Brigade Combat Team in the Massachusetts ARNG
- 103rd Field Artillery Regiment
  - 1st Battalion is a cannon battalion in the Rhode Island ARNG, assigned to the 197th Field Artillery Brigade
- 107th Field Artillery Regiment
  - 1st Battalion is the cannon battalion assigned to the 2nd Infantry Brigade Combat Team, 28th Infantry Division in the Pennsylvania ARNG
- 108th Field Artillery Regiment
  - 1st Battalion is the cannon battalion assigned to the 56th Stryker Brigade Combat Team in the Pennsylvania ARNG
- 109th Field Artillery Regiment
  - 1st Battalion is a cannon (M109A6) battalion in the Pennsylvania ARNG assigned to the 169th Field Artillery Brigade
- 111th Field Artillery Regiment
  - 1st Battalion is the cannon battalion assigned to the 116th Infantry Brigade Combat Team in the Virginia ARNG
- 112th Field Artillery Regiment
  - 3rd Battalion is the cannon battalion assigned to the 44th Infantry Brigade Combat Team in the New Jersey ARNG
- 113th Field Artillery Regiment
  - 1st Battalion is the M109A7 battalion assigned to the 30th Armored Brigade Combat Team in the North Carolina ARNG
  - 5th Battalion is a HIMARS battalion in the North Carolina ARNG assigned to the 65th Field Artillery Brigade
- 114th Field Artillery Regiment
  - 2nd Battalion is the cannon battalion assigned to the 155th Armored Brigade Combat Team in the Mississippi ARNG
- 116th Field Artillery Regiment
  - 2nd Battalion is the cannon battalion assigned to the 53rd Infantry Brigade Combat Team in the Florida ARNG
  - 3rd Battalion is a rocket battalion in the Florida ARNG assigned to the 138th Field Artillery Brigade
- 117th Field Artillery Regiment
  - 1st Battalion is a cannon battalion in the Alabama ARNG assigned to the 142nd Field Artillery Brigade
- 118th Field Artillery Regiment
  - 1st Battalion is the cannon battalion assigned to the 48th Infantry Brigade Combat Team in the Georgia ARNG
- 119th Field Artillery Regiment
  - 1st Battalion is an M777 Battalion in the Michigan ARNG assigned to the 197th Field Artillery Brigade
- 120th Field Artillery Regiment
  - 1st Battalion is the cannon battalion assigned to the 32nd Infantry Brigade Combat Team in the Wisconsin ARNG
- 121st Field Artillery Regiment
  - 1st Battalion is a rocket battalion in the Wisconsin ARNG assigned to the 115th Field Artillery Brigade
- 122nd Field Artillery Regiment
  - 2nd Battalion is the cannon battalion assigned to the 33rd Infantry Brigade Combat Team in the Illinois ARNG
- 123rd Field Artillery Regiment
  - 2nd Battalion is a cannon battalion in the Illinois ARNG assigned to the 169th Field Artillery Brigade
- 125th Field Artillery Regiment
  - 1st Battalion is the cannon battalion assigned to the 1st Armored Brigade Combat Team, 34th Infantry Division in the Minnesota ARNG
- 129th Field Artillery Regiment
  - 1st Battalion is a cannon battalion in the Missouri ARNG assigned to the 45th Field Artillery Brigade
- 130th Field Artillery Regiment
  - 2nd Battalion is a rocket battalion in the Kansas ARNG assigned to the 130th Field Artillery Brigade
- 133rd Field Artillery Regiment
  - 1st Battalion is the cannon battalion assigned to the 72nd Infantry Brigade Combat Team in the Texas ARNG
  - 3rd Battalion is the cannon battalion assigned to the 56th Infantry Brigade Combat Team in the Texas ARNG
  - 4th Battalion is a HIMARS battalion assigned to the Texas ARNG
- 134th Field Artillery Regiment
  - 1st Battalion is the cannon battalion assigned to the 37th Infantry Brigade Combat Team in the Ohio ARNG
- 138th Field Artillery Regiment
  - 2nd Battalion is a cannon battalion in the Kentucky ARNG assigned to the 138th Field Artillery Brigade
- 141st Field Artillery Regiment
  - 1st Battalion is the cannon battalion assigned to the 256th Infantry Brigade Combat Team in the Louisiana ARNG
- 142nd Field Artillery Regiment
  - 1st Battalion is a rocket battalion in the Arkansas ARNG assigned to the 142nd Field Artillery Brigade
  - 2nd Battalion is a cannon battalion in the Arkansas ARNG assigned to the 142nd Field Artillery Brigade
- 143rd Field Artillery Regiment
  - 1st Battalion is the cannon battalion assigned to the 79th Infantry Brigade Combat Team in the California ARNG
- 144th Field Artillery Regiment
  - 1st Battalion is the cannon battalion in the California ARNG assigned to the 115th Field Artillery Brigade
- 145th Field Artillery Regiment
  - 1st Battalion is the cannon (M109A6) battalion in the Utah ARNG assigned to the 65th Field Artillery Brigade
- 146th Field Artillery Regiment
  - 2nd Battalion is the cannon battalion assigned to the 81st Stryker Brigade Combat Team in the Washington ARNG
- 147th Field Artillery Regiment
  - 1st Battalion is a rocket battalion in the South Dakota ARNG assigned to the 115th Field Artillery Brigade
- 148th Field Artillery Regiment
  - 1st Battalion is the cannon battalion assigned to the 116th Cavalry Brigade Combat Team in the Idaho ARNG
- 150th Field Artillery Regiment
  - 2nd Battalion is a cannon battalion in the Indiana ARNG assigned to the 138th Field Artillery Brigade
- 151st Field Artillery Regiment
  - 1st Battalion is a cannon battalion in the Minnesota ARNG assigned to the 115th Field Artillery Brigade
- 157th Field Artillery Regiment
  - 3rd Battalion is a rocket battalion in the Colorado ARNG assigned to the 169th Field Artillery Brigade
- 158th Field Artillery Regiment
  - 1st Battalion is a HIMARS battalion in the Oklahoma ARNG assigned to the 45th Field Artillery Brigade
- 160th Field Artillery Regiment
  - 1st Battalion is the cannon battalion assigned to the 45th Infantry Brigade Combat Team in the Oklahoma ARNG
- 161st Field Artillery Regiment
  - 1st Battalion is a cannon battalion in the Kansas ARNG
- 163rd Field Artillery Regiment
  - 1st Battalion is the cannon battalion assigned to the 76th Infantry Brigade Combat Team in the Indiana ARNG
- 178th Field Artillery Regiment
  - 1st Battalion is a cannon (M109A6) battalion in the South Carolina ARNG assigned to the 65th Field Artillery Brigade
- 181st Field Artillery Regiment
  - 1st Battalion is a HIMARS battalion in the Tennessee ARNG assigned to the 142nd Field Artillery Brigade
- 182nd Field Artillery Regiment
  - 1st Battalion is a HIMARS battalion in the Michigan ARNG assigned to the 197th Field Artillery Brigade
- 194th Field Artillery Regiment
  - 1st Battalion is the cannon battalion assigned to the 2nd Infantry Brigade Combat Team 34th Infantry Division in the Iowa ARNG
- 197th Field Artillery Regiment
  - 3rd Battalion is a HIMARS battalion in the New Hampshire ARNG assigned to the 197th Field Artillery Brigade
- 201st Field Artillery Regiment
  - 1st Battalion is a cannon battalion in the West Virginia ARNG assigned to the 197th Field Artillery Brigade
- 206th Field Artillery Regiment
  - 1st Battalion is the cannon battalion assigned to the 39th Infantry Brigade Combat Team in the Arkansas ARNG
- 214th Field Artillery Regiment
  - 1st Battalion is a cannon battalion in the Georgia ARNG assigned to the 65th Field Artillery Brigade
- 218th Field Artillery Regiment
  - 2nd Battalion is the cannon battalion assigned to the 41st Infantry Brigade Combat Team in the Oregon Army National Guard
- 222nd Field Artillery Regiment
  - 2nd Battalion is a cannon (M109A6) battalion in the Utah ARNG assigned to the 65th Field Artillery Brigade
- 258th Field Artillery Regiment
  - 1st Battalion is the cannon battalion assigned to the 27th Infantry Brigade Combat Team in the New York Army National Guard
- 300th Field Artillery Regiment
  - 2nd Battalion is a HIMARS battalion in the Wyoming ARNG assigned to the 115th Field Artillery Brigade
- 487th Field Artillery Regiment
  - 1st Battalion is the cannon battalion assigned to the 29th Infantry Brigade Combat Team in the Hawaii Army National Guard
- 623rd Field Artillery Regiment
  - 1st Battalion is a HIMARS battalion in the Kentucky ARNG assigned to the 138th Field Artillery Brigade

=== Inactive Regiments ===
- 10th Field Artillery Regiment
- 21st Field Artillery Regiment
- 22nd Field Artillery Regiment
- 23rd Field Artillery Regiment
- 24th Field Artillery Regiment
- 26th Field Artillery Regiment
- 28th Field Artillery Regiment
- 33rd Field Artillery Regiment
- 34th Field Artillery Regiment
- 35th Field Artillery Regiment
- 36th Field Artillery Regiment
- 39th Field Artillery Regiment
- 42nd Field Artillery Regiment
- 73rd Field Artillery Regiment
- 75th Field Artillery Regiment
- 76th Field Artillery Regiment
- 80th Field Artillery Regiment
- 81st Field Artillery Regiment
- 83rd Field Artillery Regiment
- 84th Field Artillery Regiment
- 86th Field Artillery Regiment
- 92nd Field Artillery Regiment
- 102nd Field Artillery Regiment, Massachusetts ARNG
- 109th Field Artillery Regiment, Pennsylvania ARNG
- 110th Field Artillery Regiment, Maryland ARNG, converted to Information Operations
- 115th Field Artillery Regiment, Tennessee ARNG
- 126th Field Artillery Regiment, Wisconsin ARNG
- 127th Field Artillery Regiment, Kansas ARNG
- 128th Field Artillery Regiment, Missouri ARNG
- 131st Field Artillery Regiment, Texas ARNG
- 139th Field Artillery Regiment, Indiana ARNG, Colorado ARNG
- 152nd Field Artillery Regiment, Maine ARNG
- 156th Field Artillery Regiment, New York ARNG
- 162nd Field Artillery Regiment, Puerto Rico ARNG
- 163rd Field Artillery Regiment, Indiana ARNG
- 172nd Field Artillery Regiment, New Hampshire ARNG
- 178th Field Artillery Regiment, South Carolina ARNG
- 180th Field Artillery Regiment, Arizona ARNG
- 333rd Field Artillery Regiment
- 355th Field Artillery Regiment, Connecticut Organized Reserve unit of the 76th Division, 1921–1941.

== U.S. Marine Corps ==
=== Active ===
- 10th Marines is assigned to the 2nd Marine Division, stationed at Camp Lejeune, North Carolina
  - 1st Battalion
  - 2nd Battalion
- 11th Marines is assigned to the 1st Marine Division, stationed at Camp Pendleton, California
  - 1st Battalion
  - 2nd Battalion
  - 3rd Battalion
  - 5th Battalion
- 12th Marines is assigned to the 3rd Marine Division, stationed in Okinawa, Japan
  - 1st Battalion is stationed at Kaneohe Bay, Hawaii
  - 3rd Battalion is stationed in Okinawa, Japan
- 14th Marines is assigned to the 4th Marine Division, with headquarters at Fort Worth, Texas.
  - 2nd Battalion is based in Grand Prairie, Texas
  - 3rd Battalion is based in Bristol, Pennsylvania
  - 5th Battalion is based in Seal Beach, California

=== Inactive ===
- 13th Marines
- 15th Marines

== See also ==
- List of infantry battalions of the Army National Guard from 1959
- List of armored and cavalry regiments of the United States Army
