= 434th Field Artillery Brigade =

- 434th Field Artillery Brigade Shoulder Sleeve Insignia
- Active: 1942 - 1990; 2007 - present
- Country: United States
- Branch: United States Army
- Type: Field artillery
- Role: Basic Combat Training
- Size: Brigade
- Part of: United States Army Fires Center of Excellence
- Garrison/HQ: Fort Sill, OK

Commanders
- Brigade Commander: COL Reginald White
- Brigade Command Sergeant Major: CSM Scott Kelsey

Insignia
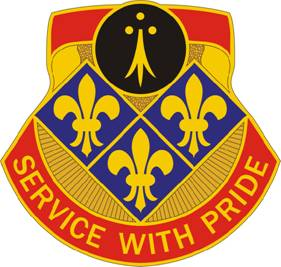
- 434th Field Artillery Brigade DUI

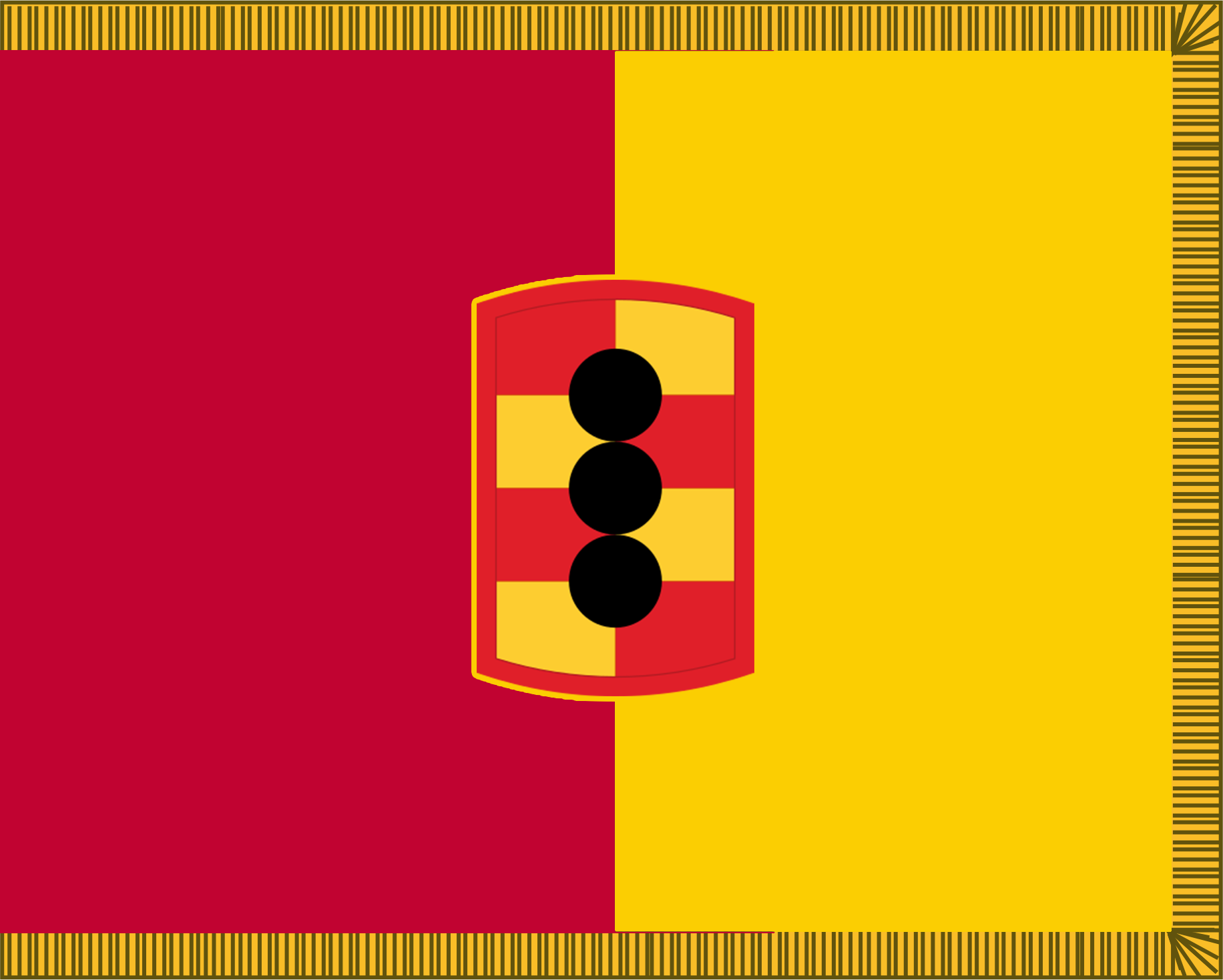
- 434th Field Artillery Brigade Flag

The 434th Field Artillery Brigade is a training brigade under the United States Army Fires Center of Excellence, under the United States Army Transformation and Training Command. The brigade conducts Basic Combat Training for new enlistees in the U.S. Army.

== Organization ==
The 434th Field Artillery Brigade consists of four training battalions, a reception battalion, and a training support detachment:

- Headquarters and Headquarters Detachment
- 1st Battalion, 22nd Field Artillery Regiment- Five basic combat training batteries
- 1st Battalion, 31st Field Artillery Regiment- Six basic combat training batteries
- 1st Battalion, 40th Field Artillery Regiment- five basic combat training batteries
- 1st Battalion, 79th Field Artillery Regiment- five basic combat training batteries
- 95th Adjutant General Battalion (Reception)

== History ==
The unit was constituted on 21 November 1942 in the United States Army as Headquarters and Headquarters Company, 1st Tank Destroyer Brigade. It was activated on 24 November 1942 at Camp Hood, Texas. On 22 January 1944, the 1st Tank Destroyer Brigade sailed abroad RMS Queen Mary, from New York Port of Embarkation, arrived Greenock, Scotland 28 January 1944. On 11 July 1944 the Brigade landed on Utah Beach, France.

On 2 August 1944 Field Order #10, HQ, VIII Corps designated 1st TD Brigade as HQ for Task Force “A” commanded by Gen Herbert Ernst, consisting of the 15th Cav Group, the 705th TD Battalion, 6th TD Group,509th Engineer Co, and 159th Engineer BN. Their mission was to attack from Avranches to Morlaix, to assist in clearing the Brittany Peninsula and to assist in the capture of Brest. TF A captured 1,679 Enemy Prisoners of War and inflicted heavy damage to enemy personnel and equipment.

On 17 April 1947, the Brigade was re-designated as Headquarters and Headquarters Battery, 434th Field Artillery Group and allotted to the organized reserves. On 1 June 1978, it was re-designated as Headquarters and Headquarters Battery, 434th Field Artillery Brigade. Two active reserve firing battalions reported to the Brigade: the 4/75th Field Artillery and the 7/1st Field Artillery. Each battalion comprised three firing batteries equipped with 8" M110 howitzer (self-propelled), which were capable of firing tactical nuclear weapons.

The Brigade was inactivated on 31 December 1990 in Chicago, Illinois. There remains an informal, unincorporated fraternal organization consisting of some of the officers and men who served with the firing battalions of the 434th Field Artillery Brigade.

On 17 April 2007, the Field Artillery Training Center, Fires Centre of Excellence, was reflagged as the 434th Field Artillery Brigade at Fort Sill, OK as an Army Training Center responsible for the training of the Army's newest recruits. It was to receive, process, and train service members in Basic Combat Training (BCT); MOS Cannon Crewmember; Advanced Individual Training (AIT); Warrior Transition Course; and English as a Second Language. The FATC had originally been established at Fort Sill as the FA Replacement Centre in 1950 to provide replacements for the Korean War.

"In 1978, the training and reception battalions were re-designated in accordance with the Army’s Combat Arms Regimental System. The next major change.. took place in 2004 as the 2nd Battalion, 80th Field Artillery, the brigade’s AIT battalion, was inactivated and as the 1-78 FA, the support battalion, was designated the AIT battalion and assigned to the 30th FA Regiment (now the 428th FA Brigade)."

More information about the current status of 434th Field Artillery Brigade may be found here.

== Lineage and honors ==
=== Lineage ===
- Constituted 21 November 1942 in the Army of the United States as Headquarters and Headquarters Company, 1st Tank Destroyer Brigade
- Activated 24 November 1942 at Camp Hood, Texas
- Inactivated 3 November 1945 in Germany
- Converted and redesignated 17 April 1947 as Headquarters and Headquarters Battery, 434th Field Artillery Group, and allotted to the Organized Reserves
- Activated 7 May 1947 at Kansas City, Missouri

(Organized Reserves redesignated 25 March 1948 as the Organized Reserve Corps; redesignated 9 July 1952 as the Army Reserve)

- Redesignated 30 September 1959 as Headquarters and Headquarters Battery, 434th Artillery Group
- Location changed 31 December 1965 to Chicago, Illinois
- Redesignated 15 March 1972 as Headquarters and Headquarters Battery, 434th Field Artillery Group
- Redesignated 1 June 1978 as Headquarters and Headquarters Battery, 434th Field Artillery Brigade
- Inactivated 31 December 1990 at Chicago, Illinois
- Transferred 9 November 2006 to the United States Army Training and Doctrine Command
- Headquarters activated 17 April 2007 at Fort Sill, Oklahoma

=== Campaign participation credit ===
- World War II: Normandy; Northern France; Rhineland; Ardennes-Alsace; Central Europe

=== Decorations ===
None
