= 1st Battalion, 79th Field Artillery Regiment =

The 1st Battalion, 79th Field Artillery is the only active duty element remaining of the 79th Field Artillery. First constituted on 1 July 1916 in the Regular Army as Troops A (Alpha) and B (Bravo) in the 21st Cavalry, their mission has changed greatly from their Cavalry days. The 1st Battalion, 79th Field Artillery is part of the 434th Field Artillery Brigade charged with the TRADOC mission of Basic Combat Training or BCT of new soldiers to the United States Army.

== History and lineage ==
Constituted 1 July 1916 in the Regular Army as Troops A and B, 21st Cavalry

Organized 1 June 1917 at Fort Riley, Kansas

Consolidated, converted, and redesignated 1 November 1917 as Battery A, 79th Field Artillery (79th Field Artillery assigned 6 December 1917 to the 7th Division)

Inactivated 14 September 1921 at Camp George G. Meade, Maryland, and relieved from assignment to the 7th Division (79th Field Artillery assigned 1 January 1930 to the 7th Division; relieved 16 October 1939 from assignment to the 7th Division)

Activated 1 June 1940 at Fort Bragg, North Carolina

Reorganized and redesignated 23 February 1943 as Battery A, 697th Field Artillery Battalion

Inactivated 12 February 1946 at Camp Kilmer, New Jersey

Redesignated 5 February 1947 as Battery A, 555th Field Artillery Battalion

Activated 1 January 1949 in Korea (555th Field Artillery Battalion assigned 10 October 1954 to the 71st Infantry Division)

Inactivated 15 September 1956 at Fort Lewis, Washington Relieved 16 January 1957 from assignment to the 71st Infantry Division; concurrently redesignated as Headquarters and Headquarters Battery, 1st Battalion, 79th Artillery

Redesignated 1 June 1958 as Headquarters and Headquarters Battery, 1st Missile Battalion, 79th Artillery (organic elements concurrently constituted)

Battalion activated 24 June 1958 in Italy

Inactivated 25 June 1959 in Italy

Redesignated 1 July 1960 as the 1st Howitzer Battalion, 79th Artillery, assigned to the 7th Infantry Division, and activated in Korea

Redesignated 1 July 1963 as the 1st Battalion, 79th Artillery

Inactivated 2 April 1971 at Fort Lewis, Washington

Redesignated 1 September 1971 as the 1st Battalion, 79th Field Artillery

Activated 21 October 1975 at Fort Ord, California

Inactivated 1 October 1983 at Fort Ord, California, and relieved from assignment to the 7th Infantry Division

Headquarters transferred 16 August 1995 to the United States Army Training and Doctrine Command and activated at Fort Sill, Oklahoma.

1st Battalion, 79th Field Artillery has five active batteries (Alpha, Bravo, Charlie, Delta, and Echo) and they are all charged with the BCT mission. Up until January 2011 Echo and Delta Batteries were conducting Warrior Transition Courses (or WTC), where prior service members of other branches, such as the Navy or Coast Guard, receive training to prepare them for service in the United States Army. Golf Battery, 1st Battalion, 79th Field Artillery have reflagged into 1st Battalion, 31st Field Artillery on 10 February 2011 and Fox Trot Battery 1st Battalion, 79th Field Artillery also reflagged into 1st Battalion, 31st Field Artillery in December 2010. In March 2011 1st Battalion, 79th Field Artillery will stand up a new Fox Battery to once again have six batteries conducting a BCT mission.

== Distinctive unit insignia ==
Description

A gold color metal and enamel device 1 5/32 inches (2.94 cm) in height overall consisting of the shield and crest of the coat of arms. Symbolism.

The 21st Cavalry Regiment was organized in June 1917 from the 13th Cavalry Regiment, and converted into Field Artillery as the 79th, in November of the same year. Its original Cavalry character is shown by the color of the field, its Field Artillery service by the red bend. The canton shows a device from the badge of the 13th Cavalry, the parent organization. The regiment insignia in base is the shoulder sleeve insignia of the 7th Division with colors reversed, surrounded by a green band. Background.

The distinctive unit insignia was originally approved for the 79th Field Artillery Regiment on 22 December 1928. It was redesignated for the 79th Artillery Regiment on 14 April 1958. The insignia was redesignated effective 1 September 1971, for the 79th Field Artillery Regiment.

== Coat of arms ==
Blazon

Shield

Or, a bend Gules, on a sinister canton of the like a sun in splendor of the field charged with the numeral "13" Sable (for the 13th Cavalry), in base the insignia of the regiment Proper (a Red hour-glass on a Black circle surrounded by a Green band).

Crest

On a wreath of the colors Or and Gules, a horse's head armored Proper.

Motto

OUR COUNTRY – OUR REGIMENT.

1st Battalion, uses the Motto: PEACE THROUGH VICTORY, which they gained when they were organized as the 697th Field Artillery Battalion

Symbolism

Shield

The 21st Cavalry was organized in June 1917 from the 13th Cavalry, and converted into Field Artillery as the 79th, in November of the same year. Its original Cavalry character is shown by the color of the field, its Field Artillery service by the red bend. The canton shows a device from the badge of the 13th Cavalry, the parent organization. The regiment insignia in base is the shoulder sleeve insignia of the 7th Division with colors reversed, surrounded by a green band.

Crest

The armored horse's head represents Cavalry and Armor, respectively.

Background

The coat of arms was originally approved for the 79th Field Artillery Regiment on 1 September 1920. It was redesignated for the 79th Artillery Regiment on 14 April 1958. The insignia was redesignated effective 1 September 1971, for the 79th Field Artillery Regiment.

== Campaign participation credit ==
World War I: Streamer without inscription

World War II: Naples-Foggia; Rome-Arno; North Apennines; Normandy; Northern France; Rhineland; Ardennes-Alsace; Central Europe

Korean War: UN Defensive; UN Offensive; CCF Intervention; First UN Counteroffensive; CCF Spring Offensive; Un Summer-Fall Offensive; Second Korean Winter; Korea, Summer –Fall 1952; Third Korean Winter; Korea, Summer 1953

== Unit citations or decorations ==
Republic of Korea Presidential Unit Citation for Korea 1950–1953

Republic of Korea Presidential Unit Citation for Korea 1953–1954

Republic of Korea Presidential Unit Citation for Korea 1960-1971

== Current organization ==
Alpha Battery

Bravo Battery

Charlie Battery

Delta Battery

Echo Battery
