= Herbert L. Earnest =

United States Army major general (1895–1970)

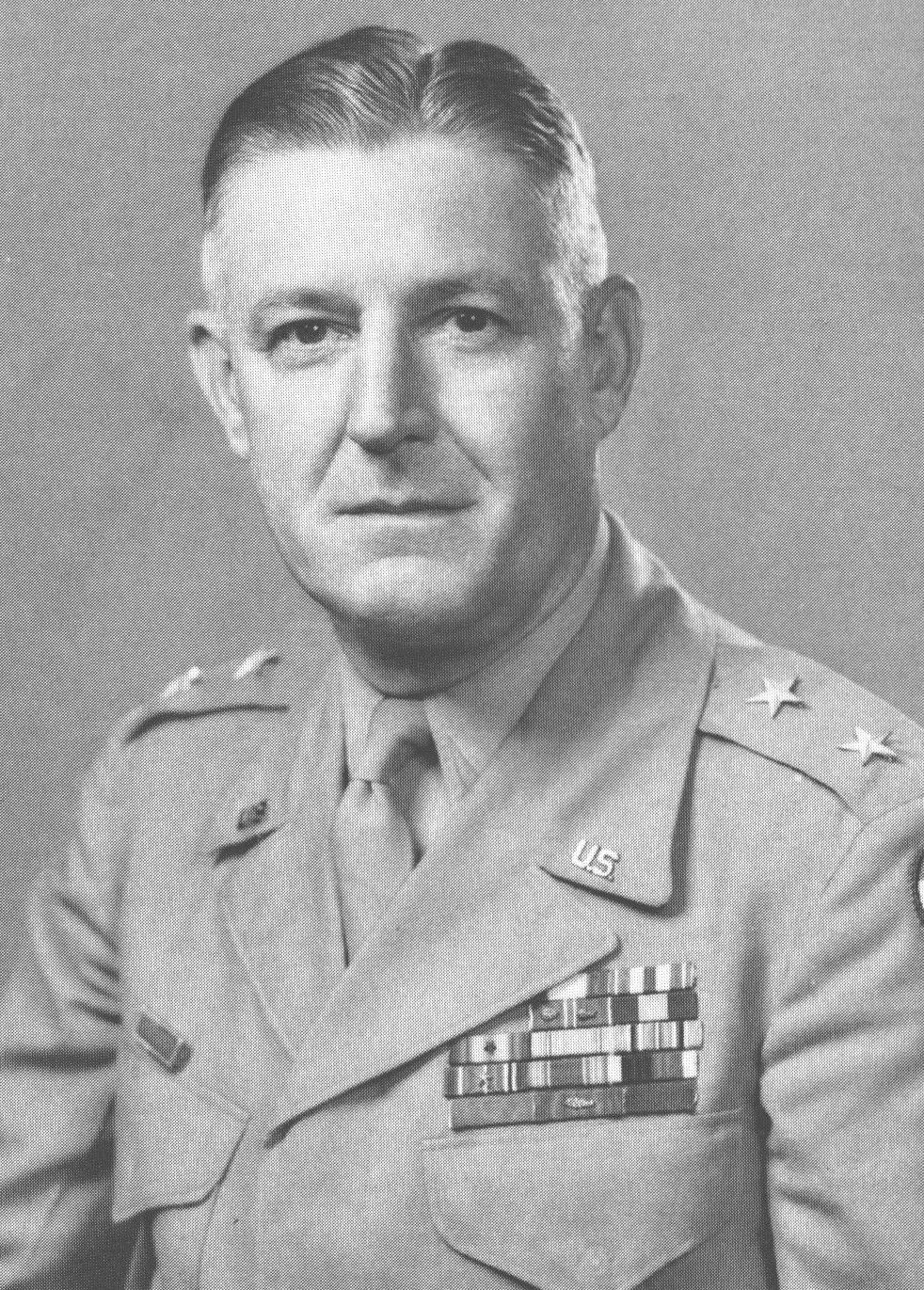
- Earnest as a major general c. 1947. Reproduced in the 1977 edition of The National Cyclopaedia of American Biography.
- Born: November 11, 1895; Richmond, Virginia, U.S.
- Died: June 11, 1970 (aged 74); Weems, Virginia, U.S.
- Burial place: Christ Church Cemetery, Weems, Virginia, U.S.
- Education: Fork Union Military Academy; Medical College of Virginia (attended); United States Army Command and General Staff College; Army Industrial College
- Spouse: Frances Alexander Campbell (m. 1920–1970)
- Children: 2
- Military career
- Service: Virginia National Guard; United States Army
- Service years: 1916–1917 (National Guard); 1917–1947 (Army)
- Rank: Corporal (National Guard); Major General (Army)
- Service number: O7282
- Unit: U.S. Army Cavalry Branch
- Commands: Troop A, 14th Cavalry Regiment; Machine Gun Troop, 14th Cavalry Regiment; 1st Tank Destroyer Brigade; Task Force A, Third United States Army; Combat Command A, 4th Armored Division; 90th Infantry Division
- Conflicts: Mexican Border War; World War I World War II; Allied-occupied Germany
- Awards: Army Distinguished Service Medal; Silver Star; Legion of Merit; Bronze Star Medal (3); Legion of Honor (Chevalier) (France); Croix de Guerre with palm (France); Distinguished Service Order (United Kingdom); Czechoslovak War Cross

Herbert L. Earnest (November 11, 1895 – June 11, 1970) was a career officer in the United States Army. A veteran of the Mexican Border War, World War I, and World War II, he attained the rank of major general as commander of the 90th Infantry Division. Earnest served from 1916 to 1947 and was a recipient of the Army Distinguished Service Medal, Silver Star, Legion of Merit, and three awards of the Bronze Star Medal. His foreign awards included the French Legion of Honor (Chevalier) and Croix de Guerre with palm, and the Distinguished Service Order from the United Kingdom.

A native of Richmond, Virginia, Earnest was educated in Richmond and graduated from Fork Union Military Academy in 1914. He attended the Medical College of Virginia, but left before graduating in order to begin a military career with the Virginia National Guard's 1st Cavalry Regiment. He attained the rank of corporal while taking part in the Mexican Border War. Earnest received an army commission as a second lieutenant of Cavalry in 1917, and took part in World War I as a member of the 3rd Cavalry Regiment. He remained in the army after the war and advanced though the ranks of the Cavalry branch, frequently as an equitation instructor at various army schools. He was a 1934 graduate of the United States Army Command and General Staff College, and a 1939 graduate of the Army Industrial College.

During World War II, Earnest commanded the 1st Tank Destroyer Brigade and an ad hoc task force (Task Force A) of Third United States Army during combat on the coast of France. He subsequently commanded Combat Command A of the 4th Armored Division, which led the breaking of the Nazi siege of Bastogne during the Battle of the Bulge. He was promoted to major general as commander of the 90th Infantry Division in early 1945, and he led the division during combat in Germany and Czechoslovakia. After the war, he remained in command as the division performed duty in Bavaria during the mid-to-late 1945 period of the Allied-occupied Germany. After returning to the United States, Earnest served as assistant chief of staff for operations (G-3) on the staff of the Army Ground Forces headquarters. He retired in 1948, after which he resided first in White Stone, Virginia, and later in Weems, Virginia.

Earnest died in Richmond on June 11, 1970. He was buried at Christ Church Cemetery in Weems.

== Early life ==
Herbert Ludwell Earnest was born in Richmond, Virginia on November 11, 1895, the son of James Austin Earnest and Mary Elizabeth (Talley) Earnest. He was educated in the public schools of Richmond and was a 1914 graduate of Fork Union Military Academy. He attended the Medical College of Virginia for a year, then left to join the Virginia National Guard's 1st Virginia Cavalry. He served for two years, including federalization for duty during the Mexican Border War, and advanced in rank from private to corporal.

With the army expanding following U.S. entry into World War I, in August 1917, Earnest's application for an army commission was approved and he was appointed a second lieutenant of Cavalry. Assigned to the 3rd Cavalry Regiment at Fort Sam Houston, Texas, he served with the regiment during its organization and training in the United States, and was with it when it departed for France as part of the American Expeditionary Forces. Earnest was regarded as one of the army's best horsemen, and in addition to playing polo, during his career both his wife and he took part in numerous horse shows and competitions.

== Start of career ==
During the First World War, the 3rd Cavalry conducted remount services in France for the U.S. Army, and Earnest served with the regiment until the end of the war. In October 1917, he was promoted to temporary first lieutenant. After the war, the 3rd Cavalry was assigned to Fort Ethan Allen, Vermont, where he served until September 1921. In May 1919, his promotion to first lieutenant was made permanent, and he was promoted to captain in July 1920. From 1921 to 1923, Earnest attended the basic officers' course at the Fort Riley, Kansas Cavalry School. Following his graduation, he was enrolled as a student in the school's Advanced Equitation Course. He completed this program of instruction in 1924, after which he was assigned to the Cavalry School as an instructor.

In April 1925, Earnest returned to France, this time as a student at the École de cavalerie, Saumur. When he returned in 1926, he was assigned to the United States Army Command and General Staff College as an instructor in equitation. From 1929 to 1930, Earnest served with the 12th Cavalry Regiment at Fort Brown, Texas. In 1930, Earnest was assigned as an American Battle Monuments Commission escort officer, one of a group of officers that escorted Gold Star Mothers to France so they could visit the graves of their sons who had died during World War I.

== Continued career ==
From 1930 to 1932, Earnest served with the 14th Cavalry Regiment at Fort Des Moines, Iowa, first as commander of A Troop, then Machine Gun Troop, then on the regimental staff as operations officer, intelligence officer, provost marshal, and public affairs officer. After Civilian Conservation Corps duty in Missouri during 1933, he was a student at the Command and General Staff College, from which he graduated in June 1934. He then joined the 10th Cavalry Regiment at Fort Myer, Virginia, followed by assignment to the 3rd Cavalry, also at Fort Myer, and he was promoted to major in August 1935. In 1936, he completed the Chemical Warfare Course at Edgewood Arsenal, Maryland. After graduating, he remained at the school as an instructor in equitation.

From 1938 to 1939, Earnest was a student at the Army Industrial College (now the Dwight D. Eisenhower School for National Security and Resource Strategy). After graduating, he served until 1942 as a planner in the Operations and Training directorate (G-3) of the Army General Staff. He was promoted to lieutenant colonel in August 1940. In the early 1940s, the army again began to expand, this time in anticipation of U.S. entry into World War II, and Earnest was promoted to temporary colonel in December 1941. From 1942 to 1943, he was assigned to the army's Tank Destroyer Command at Fort Hood, Texas, first as the command's executive officer, then as commander of the 1st Tank Destroyer Brigade.

Earnest was promoted to temporary brigadier general in February 1943, and he led the 1st Tank Destroyer Brigade during its final training at Camp Claiborne, Louisiana and departure for combat in Europe. After additional training in England, in August 1944, the brigade landed in France as part of Third United States Army. During combat in Daoulas and Crozon, Earnest commanded an ad hoc unit, Task Force A, which included his brigade as well as artillery, armor, infantry, and air support. Task Force A played a major role in capturing the Brittany peninsula from the troops of Nazi Germany, as well as capturing numerous prisoners of war.

== Later career ==
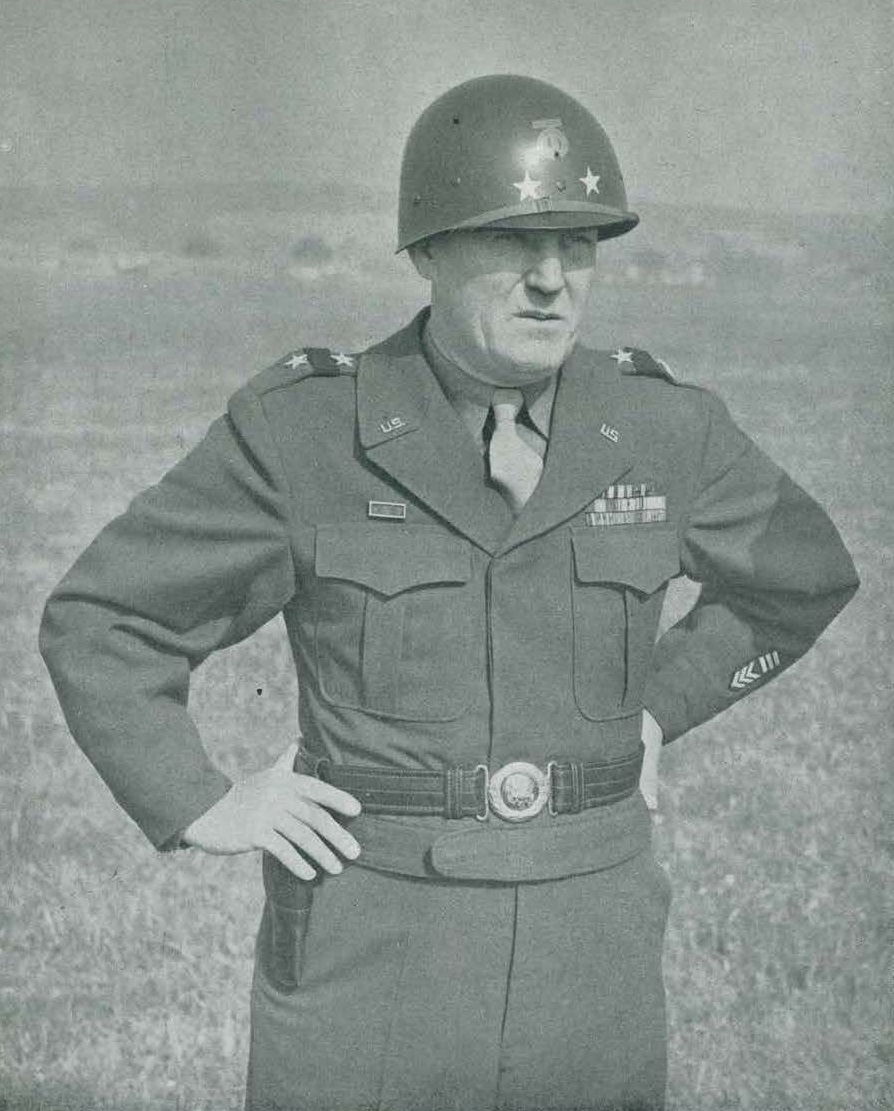
Earnest as commander of the 90th Infantry Division in 1945

In December 1944, Earnest was appointed to command Combat Command A, 4th Armored Division. During the Battle of the Bulge, his command cleared the Arlon-Bastogne Road and broke the Nazi siege of Bastogne, which effected the relief of U.S. troops that had held the town during the height of the Bulge fighting. In February 1945, Earnest was appointed assistant division commander of the 90th Infantry Division, and he became the division commander as a major general in March.

The 90th Division took part in fighting from the Eiffiel mountains to the Rhine river, followed by the capture of Mainz. The 90th Infantry Division then crossed the Rhine and fought from the Thuringian Forest to Czechoslovakia. While clearing the town of Merkers in April, the 90th Infantry Division captured the German financial reserve, including 100 tons of gold, the equivalent of millions of dollars in U.S., British, Swedish, and French currency, and additional currency from Spain, Italy, and Turkey. In addition, the reserve included many looted art treasures, among them paintings by Anthony van Dyck, Rembrandt, and Pierre-Auguste Renoir. On May 3, 1945, the 90th Infantry Division obtained the surrender of the 11th Panzer Division in Všeruby, Czechoslovakia.

Beginning in May 1945, the 90th Infantry Division was headquartered in Weiden in der Oberpfalz as it performed post-war occupation duty in Bavaria. Earnest remained in command during the occupation duty, and through December 1945, when the division returned to the United States and was inactivated. After the division's inactivation, he was assigned as assistant chief of staff for operations (G-3) at the Army Ground Forces headquarters. In 1947, an assessment of his wartime experience resulted in Earnest receiving constructive credit for attendance at the National War College. He remained with Army Ground Forces until June 1948, when he retired.

== Awards ==
Earnest's U.S. awards included:

- Army Distinguished Service Medal
- Silver Star
- Legion of Merit
- Bronze Star Medal with two oak leaf clusters

The foreign decorations conferred on Earnest included:

- Legion of Honor (Chevalier) (France)
- Croix de Guerre with palm (France)
- Distinguished Service Order (United Kingdom)
- Czechoslovak War Cross

=== Distinguished Service Medal citation ===
"For exceptionally meritorious and distinguished services to the Government of the United States, in a duty of great responsibility. Under his direction, the 90th Division, in 47 days of continuous contact with the enemy advanced some 400 miles across major rivers, mountains and difficult terrain. General Earnest's bold decisions, based on sound tactical insight, made possible rapid thrusts which completely disorganized the enemy and attained valuable objectives with minimum loss."

General Orders: War Department, General Orders No. 79 (1945) Service: Army Division: 90th Infantry Division

== Retirement and death ==
From 1948 to 1952, Earnest operated a farm in White Stone, Virginia. He later resided in Weems, Virginia, where he owned a home he christened "Riverview Landing." He was a member of the United States Armor Association, Association of the United States Army, 4th Armored Division Association, 90th Infantry Division Association, Retired Officers Association, and American Legion. In addition, he was a member of The Commonwealth Club, his local Kiwanis club, and several golf and yacht clubs.

Earnest died in Richmond on June 11, 1970. He was buried at Christ Church Cemetery in Weems.

== Family ==
In 1920, Earnest married Frances Alexander Campbell. They were the parents of two children, Clyde Tener Earnest and Frances Elizabeth Earnest.

== Works by ==
- "The Protection of Cavalry Against Liquid Vesicants". The Cavalry Journal. Washington, DC: United States Cavalry Association. March–April 1938. pp. 131–133 – via Google Books.

Military offices
Preceded by Lowell Ward Rooks	Commanding General 90th Infantry Division; 1945	Succeeded by Division inactivated
