= 113th Field Artillery Regiment =

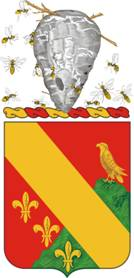
- Coat of arms
- Active: 1917–1919; 1921–1942; 1942–1945; 1947–present (parent regiment from 1959)
- Country: United States
- Branch: North Carolina Army National Guard
- Type: Field artillery
- Motto(s): "Carry On"

Insignia
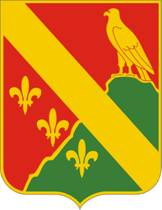
- Distinctive unit insignia

The 113th Field Artillery Regiment is a field artillery regiment of the United States Army National Guard.

== History ==
The 113th Field Artillery was constituted on 27 June 1917 following the United States entry into World War I in the North Carolina National Guard as the 1st Regiment, North Carolina Field Artillery, and organized between June and July in North Carolina. The 1st Field Artillery mustered into Federal service between 28 June and 2 August and was drafted into service on 5 August. On 12 September, it was reorganized and redesignated as the 113th Field Artillery in Federal service, joining the 30th Division. With the division, it was sent to France in 1918, attached to the British Expeditionary Force. After the end of the war it returned to the United States and was demobilized on 28 March 1919 at Camp Jackson.

== 1st Battalion ==
1st Battalion is currently an organic unit of the 30th Heavy Brigade Combat Team of the North Carolina Army National Guard.

On 21 May 2009, soldiers from A Battery successfully fired the M982 Excalibur precision-guided artillery round from FOB Mahmoudiyah while deployed to Iraq with the 30th HBCT. This marked the first time that a National Guard unit had used the new precision-guided munition in Iraq.

== 5th Battalion ==
Fifth Battalion is currently assigned to the 60th Troop Command of the North Carolina Army National Guard. The battalion is currently headquartered in Louisburg, North Carolina, with other units located in Winston-Salem and Greensboro. The battalion is currently equipped with the M142 High Mobility Artillery Rocket System (HIMARS).

== Insignia ==
=== Distinctive unit insignia ===
Description: A Gold color metal and enamel device one inch (2.54 cm) in height overall, consisting of a shield blazoned: Gules, a falcon Or on a mount issuant from sinister base Vert, overall a bend and in dexter base three fleurs-de-lis in bend of the second.

Symbolism: The shield is red for Artillery. The 113th Field Artillery, North Carolina National Guard, was attached to the 79th Division and engaged in the action of that division which resulted in the capture of Montfaucon, 27 September 1918. This is illustrated by the falcon on a mount, taken from the coat of arms of Montfaucon. The bend is taken from the arms of Lorraine. The mount and bend represent the remaining three engagements during World War I. The three fleurs-de-lis also represent the battle honors of the organization.

Background: The distinctive unit insignia was originally approved for the 113th Field Artillery Regiment on 24 February 1931. It was redesignated for the 113th Field Artillery Battalion on 29 July 1942, for the 113th Artillery Regiment on 27 May 1960, and for the 113th Field Artillery Regiment on 1 August 1972.

=== Coat of arms ===
Blazon:

Shield: Gules, a falcon Or on a mount issuant from sinister base Vert, overall a bend and in dexter base three fleurs-de-lis in bend of the second.

Crest: That for the regiments and separate battalions of the North Carolina Army National Guard: On a wreath of the colors, Or and Gules, a hornet’s nest hanging from a bough beset with 13 hornets all Proper.

Motto: CARRY ON.

Symbolism

Shield: The shield is red for Artillery. The 113th Field Artillery, North Carolina National Guard, was attached to the 79th Division and engaged in the action of that division which resulted in the capture of Montfaucon, 27 September 1918. This is illustrated by the falcon on a mount, taken from the coat of arms of Montfaucon. The bend is taken from the arms of Lorraine. The mount and bend represent the remaining three engagements during World War I. The three fleurs-de-lis also represent the battle honors of the organization.

Crest: The crest is that of the North Carolina Army National Guard.

Background: The coat of arms was originally approved for the 113th Field Artillery Regiment on 24 February 1931. It was redesignated for the 113th Field Artillery Battalion on 29 July 1942, for the 113th Artillery Regiment on 27 May 1960, and for the 113th Field Artillery Regiment on 1 August 1972.

== See also ==
- List of field artillery regiments of the United States
