= 1st Tank Destroyer Brigade =

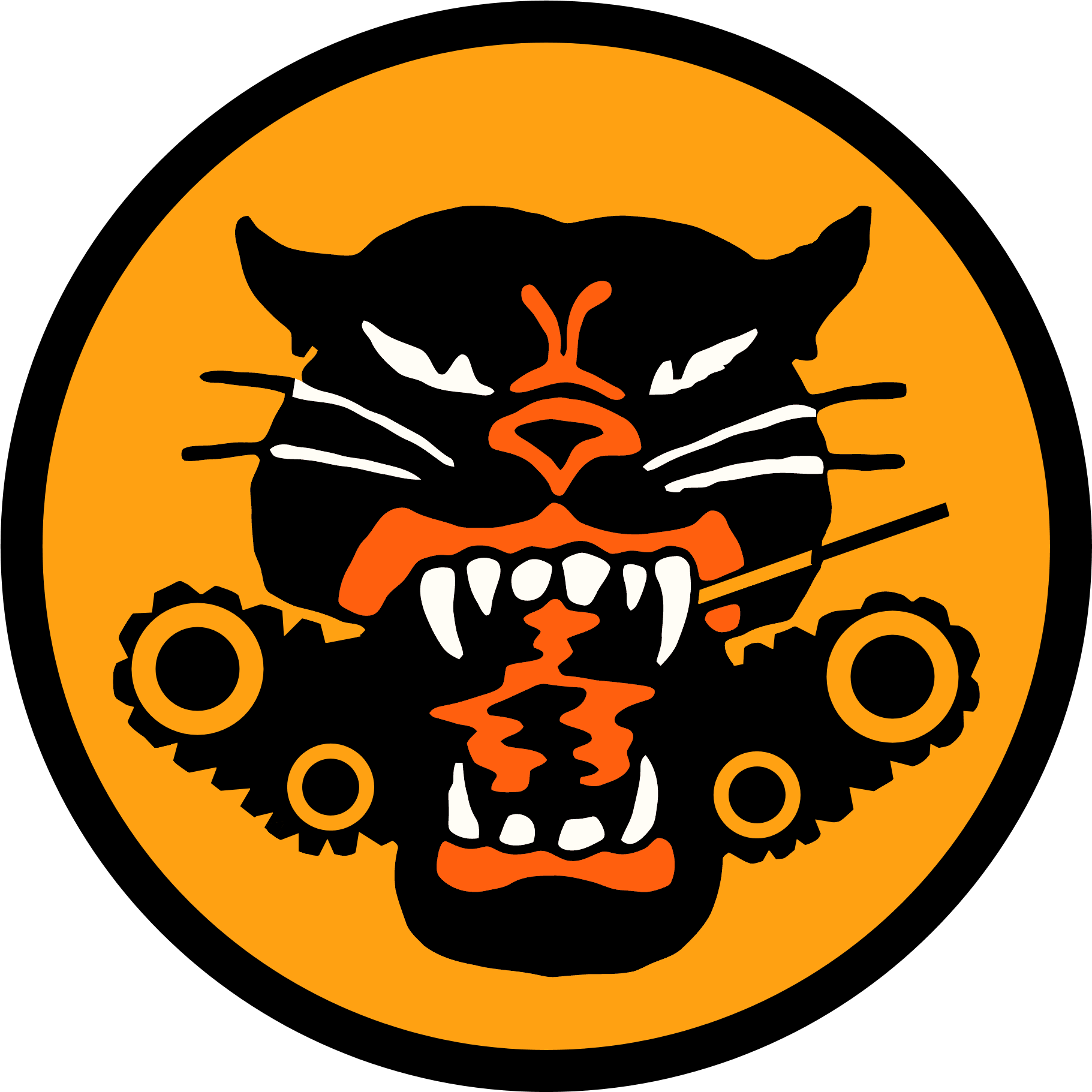
- Active: 1942–1945
- Country: United States
- Branch: United States Army
- Type: Tank destroyer headquarters
- Part of: Third Army (1944–1945)
- Engagements: World War II

The 1st Tank Destroyer Brigade was a United States Army brigade of World War II. It was formed in November 1942, and landed in France in July 1944. It took part in the campaign in Western Europe and was disbanded in November 1945. The 434th Field Artillery Brigade has continued the 1st Tank Destroyer Brigade's lineage since 1947.

== History ==
=== Role ===
The 1st Tank Destroyer Brigade was formed at Camp Hood in Texas on 18 November 1942, and was one of the two tank destroyer brigades established by the Army (the other being the 2nd Tank Destroyer Brigade, which was established on 24 November 1944). The initial role of both brigades was to oversee the training of the large number of tank destroyer battalions that had been formed.

At this time, US Army doctrine called for tank destroyers to primarily operate as concentrated tank destroyer battalions during combat. These battalions were to be grouped in regiments and brigades when needed to combat large forces of enemy tanks. Combat experience in Europe demonstrated that tank destroyer brigades were not needed. Tank destroyers were usually parcelled out to other units, and were rarely concentrated in battalions. The thirteen tank destroyer group headquarters dispatched to Europe never led massed units of tank destroyers, and nor did the 1st Tank Destroyer Brigade. The 2nd Tank Destroyer Brigade was disbanded in March 1944 without having ever been dispatched overseas.

=== Deployments ===
The brigade was transferred to Camp Claiborne in Louisiana on 26 February 1944. Between 15 September and 15 November 1943 it took part in the Louisiana Maneuvers. The brigade departed the United States on 2 January 1944, and arrived in the United Kingdom eight days later.

The 1st Tank Destroyer Brigade was landed in Normandy on 11 July 1944. On 1 August its headquarters took control of Task Force A, which comprised several armoured units and was tasked with securing railroad bridges in Brittany as part of VIII Corps. Task Force A initially comprised the brigade headquarters, the 15th Cavalry Group and the 159th Engineer Battalion and was commanded by Brigadier General Herbert L. Earnest. An infantry battalion was later detached from the 83rd Infantry Division to reinforce Task Force A. The task force took part in the early stages of the Battle of Saint-Malo before continuing west. Task Force A was disbanded on 22 September.

On 30 September 1944 the 1st Tank Destroyer Brigade became the United States Third Army's tank destroyer section. This involved the brigade headquarters staff being integrated into the Third Army's headquarters to provide advice on anti-tank issues. It continued in this role until the end of the war in Europe. Following the German surrender the brigade undertook occupation duties in Germany. It concluded these duties on 31 October 1945 and was disbanded on 3 November that year.

When the 434th Field Artillery Brigade was formed on 7 May 1947 it inherited the lineage of the 1st Tank Destroyer Brigade.

== See also ==
- List of tank destroyer units of the United States Army
