= 2nd Tank Destroyer Brigade =

- Active: 1942–1944
- Country: United States
- Branch: United States Army
- Type: Tank destroyer headquarters

The 2nd Tank Destroyer Brigade was a United States Army brigade of World War II. It was formed in November 1942 and undertook training in several locations across the United States. Due to the lack of a need for tank destroyer brigade headquarters the unit was disbanded in March 1944.

== History ==
=== Role ===
The 2nd Tank Destroyer Brigade was formed at Camp Hood in Texas as part of the Tank Destroyer Center on 24 November 1942, and was one of the two tank destroyer brigades established by the Army (the other being the 1st Tank Destroyer Brigade, which was also established at Camp Hood on 18 November 1942). The initial role of both brigades was to oversee the training of the large number of tank destroyer battalions that had been formed.

At this time, US Army doctrine called for tank destroyers to primarily operate as concentrated battalions during combat. These battalions were to be concentrated in regiment-sized groups and brigades when needed to combat large forces of enemy tanks. Combat experience in Europe demonstrated that tank destroyer brigades were not needed. Tank destroyers were usually parcelled out to other units, and were rarely concentrated in battalions. The thirteen tank destroyer group headquarters dispatched to Europe and North Africa never led massed units of tank destroyers, and nor did the 1st Tank Brigade after it was also sent there.

=== Deployments ===
The brigade was transferred to Camp Forrest in Tennessee on 11 April 1943, where it was assigned to the Second Army. From 19 April to 26 August it was at the Tennessee Maneuver Area. The 1st Tank Destroyer Brigade returned to Camp Forrest, and remained there until 20 November 1943 when it was sent to Camp Breckinridge in Kentucky. It formed part of XX Corps. The brigade was disbanded at Camp Breckinridge on 8 March 1944 as it was not needed.

== See also ==
- List of tank destroyer units of the United States Army
