= Fort Sill =

United States army post in Lawton, Oklahoma

- Lawton, Comanche County, Oklahoma
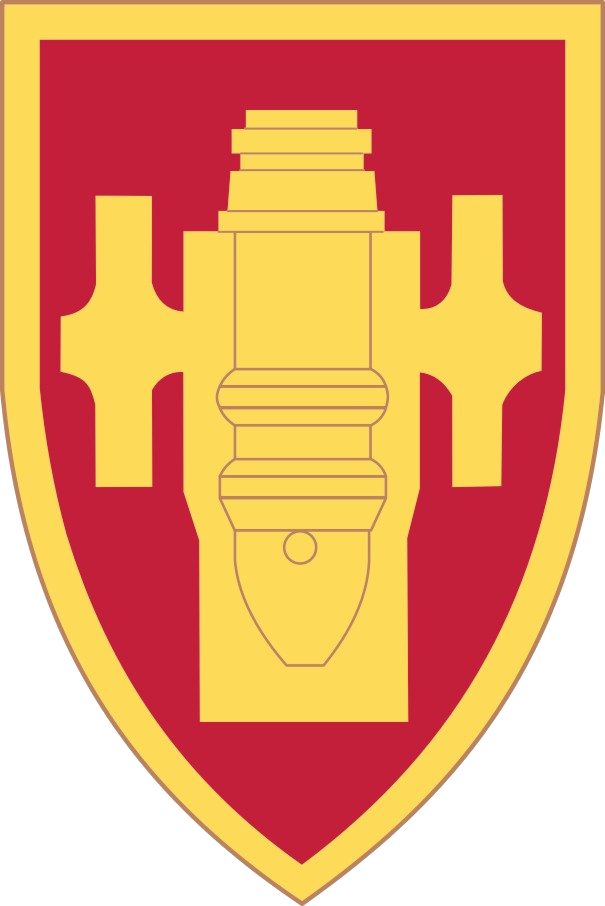
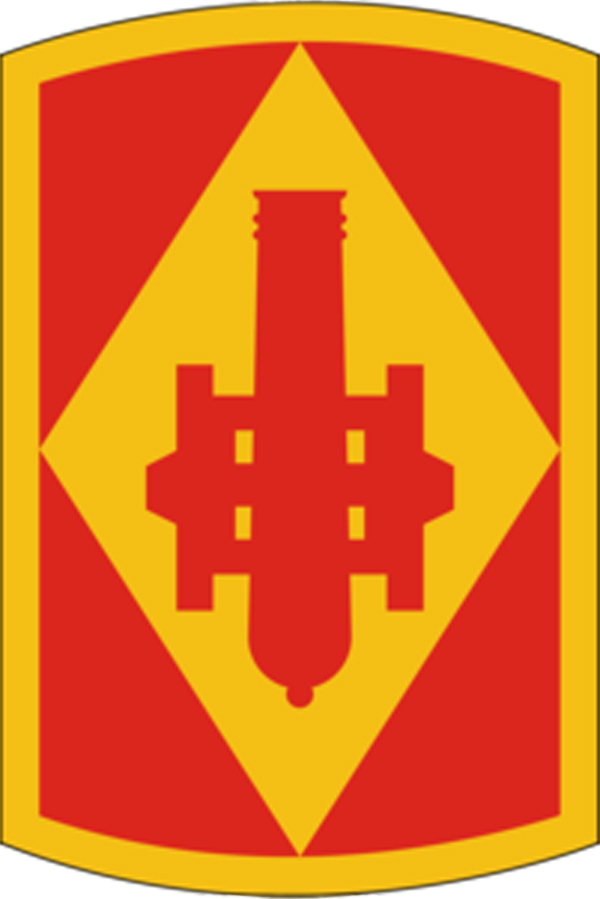
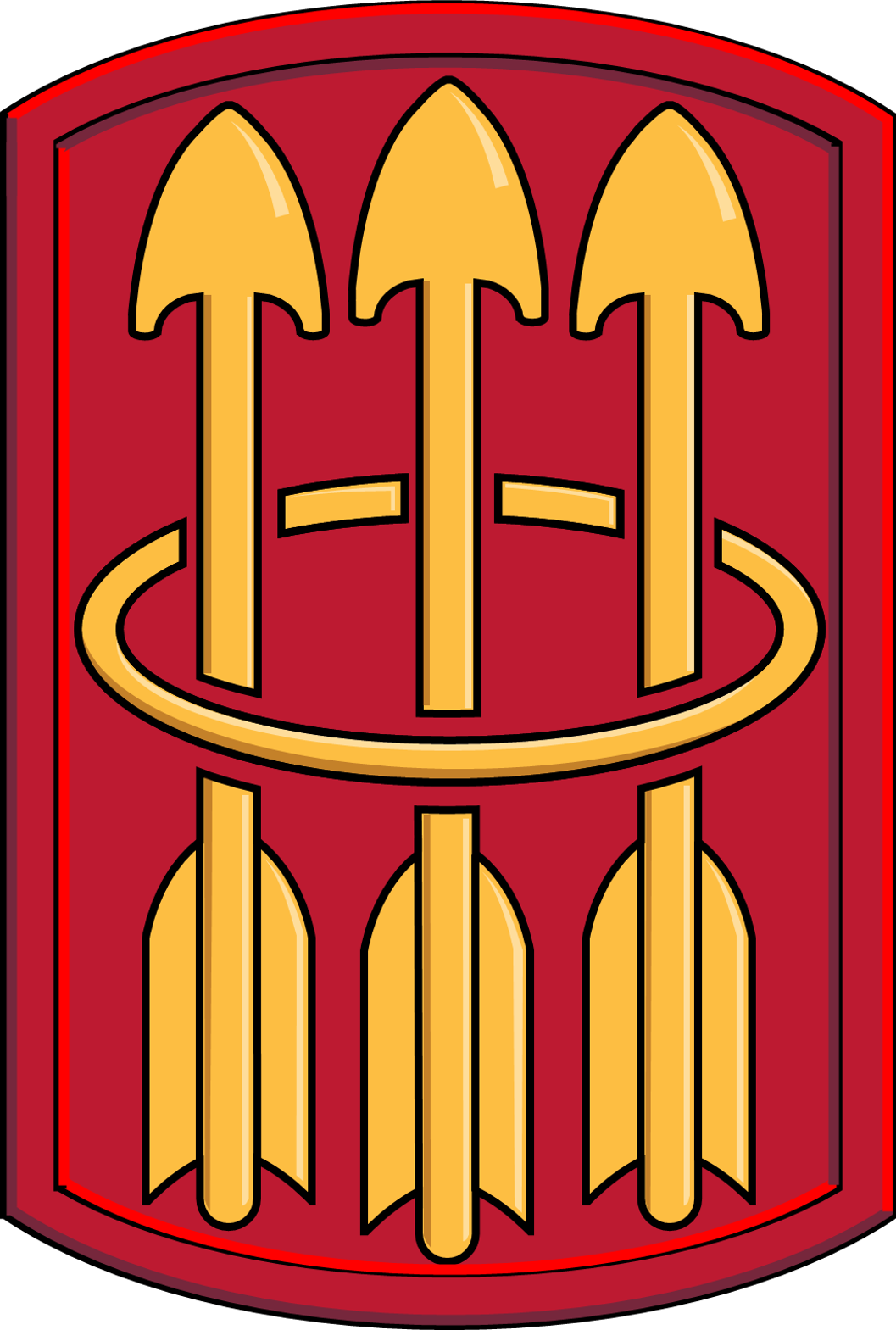
- Shoulder sleeve insignia of units stationed at Fort Sill

Site information
- Type: Military post
- Owner: United States Army
- Controlled by: United States
- Website: sill-www.army.mil

Location
- Coordinates: 34°40′16″N 98°23′23″W

Site history
- Built: 1869
- In use: 1869–present

Garrison information
- Past commanders: MG Mark McDonald
- Garrison: United States Army Field Artillery School; United States Army Air Defense Artillery School; 75th Field Artillery Brigade; 31st Air Defense Artillery Brigade
- Fort Sill, Oklahoma
- U.S. National Register of Historic Places
- U.S. National Historic Landmark
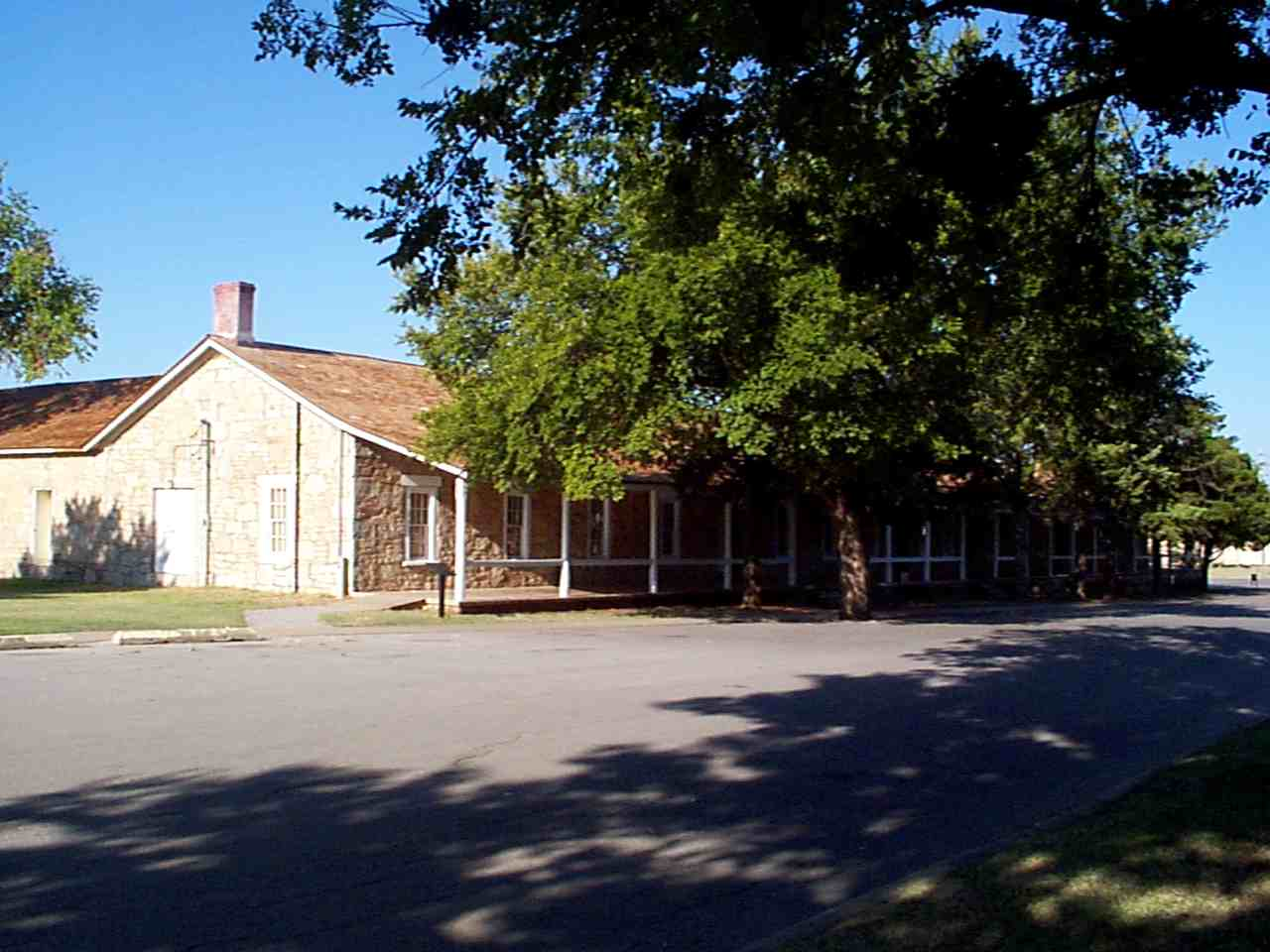
- Old infantry barracks at Fort Sill

- Location within Oklahoma Location within the United States
- Location: Lawton, Oklahoma
- Architect: US Army
- NRHP reference No.: 66000629

Significant dates
- Added to NRHP: 15 October 1966
- Designated NHL: 19 December 1960

Fort Sill is a major United States Army post north of Lawton, Oklahoma, approximately 85 miles (137 km) southwest of Oklahoma City, established in 1869 during the Indian Wars. It covers almost 94,000 acres (38,000 ha) in southwestern Oklahoma and serves as headquarters of the U.S. Army Fires Center of Excellence. The installation is a Basic Combat Training facility, training over 20,000 personnel annually in field artillery, air defense artillery, and electronic warfare.

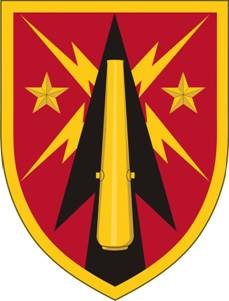
Fires Center of Excellence

Fort Sill has participated in every major U.S. conflict since its founding, evolving from a frontier cavalry outpost to a modern training hub. It houses key units including the United States Army Field Artillery School, 75th Field Artillery Brigade (United States), and the 31st Air Defense Artillery Brigade (United States). The post also supports a United States Marine Corps detachment for joint artillery training.

== History ==
The site of Fort Sill was staked out on 8 January 1869, by Maj. Gen. Philip H. Sheridan, who led a campaign into Indian Territory to stop tribes from raiding border settlements in Texas and Kansas. The primary tribes who at the time inhabited the area were the Kiowa, Plains Apache, and Comanche. These tribes of Plains Indians hunted bison and traded with neighboring groups in what is now western Oklahoma and neighboring states.

Sheridan's massive winter campaign involved six cavalry regiments accompanied by frontier scouts such as Buffalo Bill Cody, Wild Bill Hickok, Ben Clark and Jack Stilwell. Troops camped at the location of the new fort included the 7th Cavalry, the 19th Kansas Volunteers and the 10th Cavalry, a distinguished group of African American "buffalo soldiers" who constructed many of the stone buildings still surrounding the old post quadrangle.

At first, the garrison was called "Camp Wichita" and was referred to by the Indians as "the Soldier House at Medicine Bluffs." Sheridan later named it in honor of his West Point classmate and friend, Brigadier General Joshua W. Sill, who was killed during the American Civil War. The first post commander was Brevet Maj. Gen. Benjamin Grierson and the first Indian agent was Colonel Albert Gallatin Boone, grandson of Daniel Boone.

Other forts in the frontier fort system were Forts Griffin, Concho, Belknap, Chadbourne, Stockton, Davis, Bliss, McKavett, Clark, McIntosh, Inge, Phantom Hill, and Richardson in Texas. There were "sub posts or intermediate stations" including Bothwick's Station on Salt Creek between Fort Richardson and Fort Belknap, Camp Wichita near Buffalo Springs between Fort Richardson and Red River Station, and Mountain Pass between Fort Concho and Fort Griffin.

=== Peace policy ===
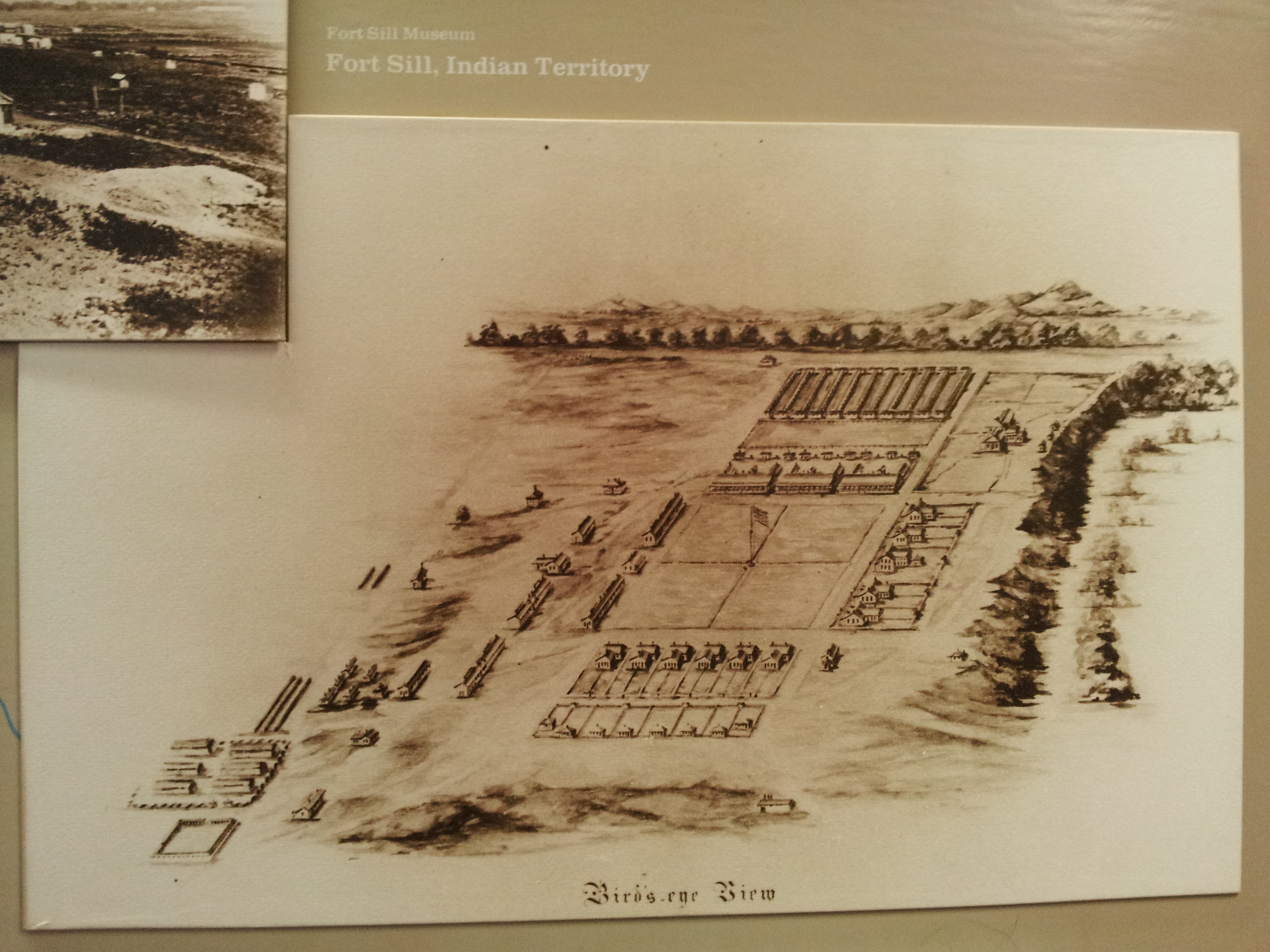
Fort Sill

Several months after Fort Sill's establishment, President Ulysses Grant implemented a "peace policy" assigning Quaker agents to oversee Southwest tribes, with Lawrie Tatum. Fort Sill soldiers were restricted from taking punitive action against the Indians, who interpreted this as a sign of weakness. The Indians resumed raiding the Texas frontier and used Fort Sill as a sanctuary.

In 1871, during a tour of posts, Gen. General of the Army William Tecumseh Sherman arrived at Fort Sill from Fort Richardson, Texas, while on a tour of Army posts throughout the country. Sherman was at Fort Richardson when they became aware of the Warren Wagon Train Raid, in which seven muleskinners were killed by Indians when their wagon train was ambushed. Soon after Sherman arrived at Fort Sill, the Indian Agent brought several Kiowa chiefs to tell their story about attacking the wagon train. When Sherman ordered their arrest during a meeting on Grierson's porch, two of the Indians attempted to assassinate him. The Commanding General's quarters were dubbed Sherman House in memory of the event.

The Army arrested three chiefs during the porch skirmish: Satank, Satanta and Addo-ete. Sherman ordered them to Texas for a civil trial for the alleged crimes. When the three were put into a wagon and taken under cavalry escort to Fort Richardson, Satank began his death song. A mile down the trail, he grabbed the carbine of one of the troopers in the wagon. Before he could cock and fire it, he was hit by several shots fired by the escort. Satank was left against a tree, and the column continued its mission. A marker on Berry Road near the curve marks where Satank, an honored warrior, fell. His grave is in Chiefs Knoll in the post cemetery.

Texas courts tried Satanta and Addo-etta on 5 and 6 July, the first time Indians had been tried in civil courts. They were sentenced to death by hanging. Supporters of the Quaker peace policy convinced Governor Edmund J. Davis to commute the Indians' sentences to life imprisonment. Then, in October 1873, they were paroled.

=== Red River War ===
In June 1874, the US Army launched the Red River War against the non-reservation Comanches, Kiowas, and Southern Cheyennes. The year-long struggle was a war of attrition that involved relentless pursuit by converging military columns.

General Phillip Sheridan ordered five army columns to converge on the general area of the Texas Panhandle and specifically upon the upper tributaries of the Red River. The strategy was to deny the Indians any safe haven by attacking, pursuing, and destroying their reservations and forcing them surrender.

Three of the five columns were under the command of Colonel Ranald S. Mackenzie. The Tenth Cavalry, under Lieutenant Colonel John W. Davidson, came due west from Fort Sill. The Eleventh Infantry, under Lieutenant Colonel George P. Buell, moved northwest from Fort Griffin. Mackenzie himself led the Fourth Cavalry north from Fort Concho.

Colonel Nelson A. Miles led the Fourth Column, which came south from Fort Dodge and included the Fifth Infantry and Sixth Cavalry. Originating from Fort Union [5], the fifth column, the Eighth Cavalry under the command of Major William R. Price, consisted of 225 officers and soldiers along with two guides and six Indian scouts. They marched east via Fort Bascom in New Mexico.[6] According to the plan, the converging columns were to continue their offensive until the Indians had been decisively defeated.

As many as twenty engagements took place across the Texas Panhandle. The Army, consisting entirely of soldiers and scouts, sought to engage the Indians at any opportunity. The Indians, traveling with women, children, and the elderly, mostly attempted to avoid them. When the two did encounter one another, the Indians usually tried to escape before the Army could force them to surrender. However, even a successful escape could be disastrously costly if horses, food, and equipment had to be left behind. By contrast, the Army and its Indian scouts had access to essentially limitless supplies and equipment; they frequently burned anything they captured from retreating Indians and were capable of continuing operations indefinitely. The war continued throughout the fall of 1874, but increasing numbers of Indians were forced to give up and head for Fort Sill to enter the reservation system.

Without a chance to graze their livestock and faced with the disappearance of the great buffalo herds, the tribes eventually surrendered. Quanah Parker and his Kwahadi Comanches were the last to abandon the struggle, and their arrival at Fort Sill in June 1875 marked the end of Indian warfare on the South Plains.

In 1877, the first African-American to graduate from West Point, Henry O. Flipper, was assigned to the 10th Cavalry Regiment, the famous Buffalo Soldiers at Fort Sill. In addition to his leadership duties in the cavalry, he directed his men to dig a ditch to drain a swamp; this is still called Flipper's Ditch, and today, a landmark exists on Upton Road by the Fort Sill Golf Course.

Unlike other U.S. territories, Indian Territory had no organized government. Hence, Army posts like Fort Reno, Fort Supply and Fort Sill found themselves the most significant federal and legal presence in a vast territory. They provided protection to Indians and civilians alike, sometimes dealt as mediators between the Indians and the Indian agents, and protected the various Indian tribes against intrusion by the Sooners.

At one point in the 1880s, the post was nearly deserted when gold was rumored to have been found in the nearby Wichita Mountains, and officers and soldiers alike rushed to stake claims.

=== Geronimo ===
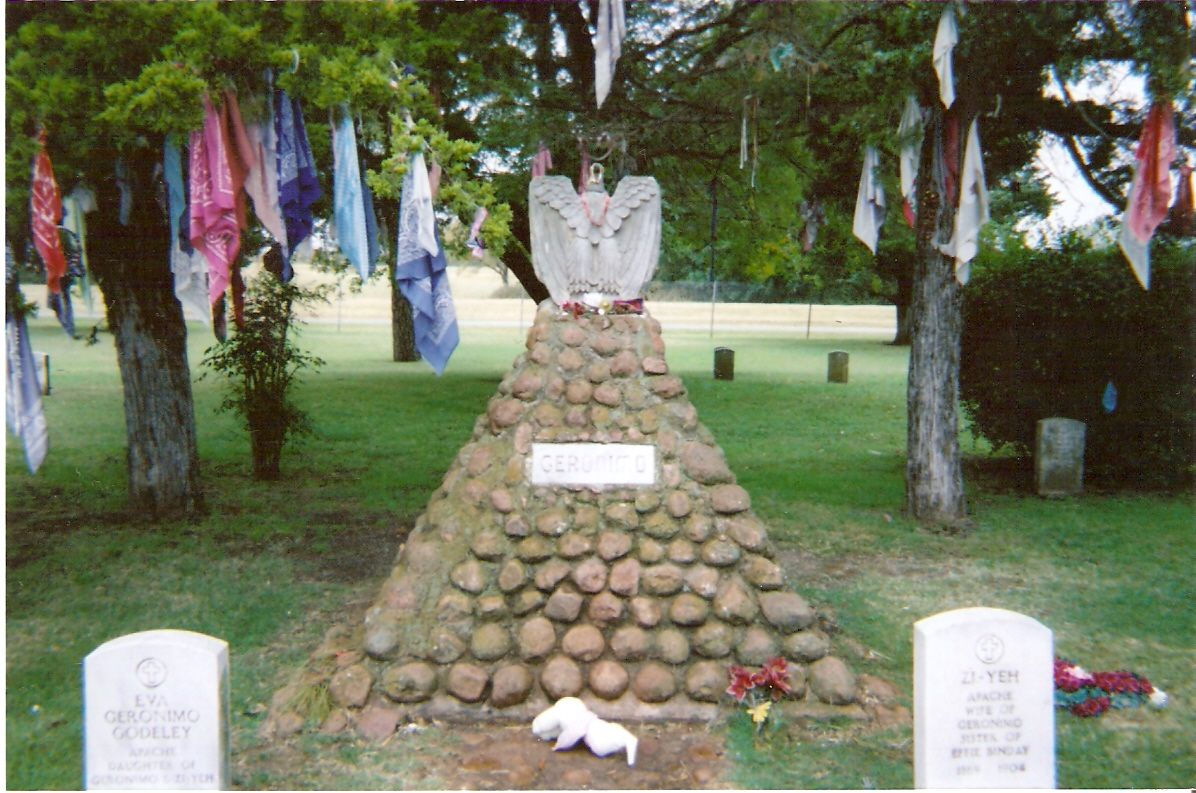
Geronimo's grave at Fort Sill with Apache prayer clothes in trees.

In 1894, Geronimo and 341 other Chiricahua Apache prisoners of war were brought to Fort Sill, where they lived in villages scattered around the post. After a couple of years, Geronimo was granted permission to travel with Pawnee Bill's Wild West Show, and he joined the Indian contingent at several annual World Expositions and Indian Expositions in the 1890s and early 1900s. Geronimo and other Indian leaders rode in the inaugural parade of President Theodore Roosevelt and met the president himself during that trip. Geronimo and the other Apache prisoners had free range of Fort Sill. He was a member of Fort Sill's Native Scouts. Still, he did make at least one documented attempt to escape from the fort, though not in the dramatic fashion of jumping off the steep Medicine Bluffs on his horse in a hail of bullets as popularized in the 1939 movie, Geronimo (which was the inspiration for parachutists of the 501st Parachute Infantry Regiment to yell his name when they jumped out of aircraft). Once, after visiting the off-post home of chief Quanah Parker, Geronimo decided to escape to his homeland in Arizona late one night rather than return to Fort Sill. He was captured the next day. He died of pneumonia in 1909 and is buried at Fort Sill.

The rest of the Apaches remained on Fort Sill until 1913. The US government promised the Chiricahua the lands surrounding the fort; however, local non-Indians resisted their settlement. In 1914, two-thirds of the tribe moved onto the Mescalero Apache Reservation, and the remaining third settled on allotments around Fletcher and Apache, Oklahoma. They became what is known today as the Fort Sill Apache Tribe.

Lt. Hugh L. Scott commanded Troop L of the 7th Cavalry, consisting entirely of Indians and considered one of the best in the West. Lt. Hugh L. Scott was a high supporter of the Native Americans and their use of sign language. Kiowa scout I-See-O and other members of the troop are credited with helping tribes on the South Plains avert the Bloody Ghost Dance uprising of the 1890s in which the US Army killed many Indians on the North Plains at Wounded Knee Creek, which created the name Battle of Wounded Knee.

=== Fort Sill Post-Allotment ===
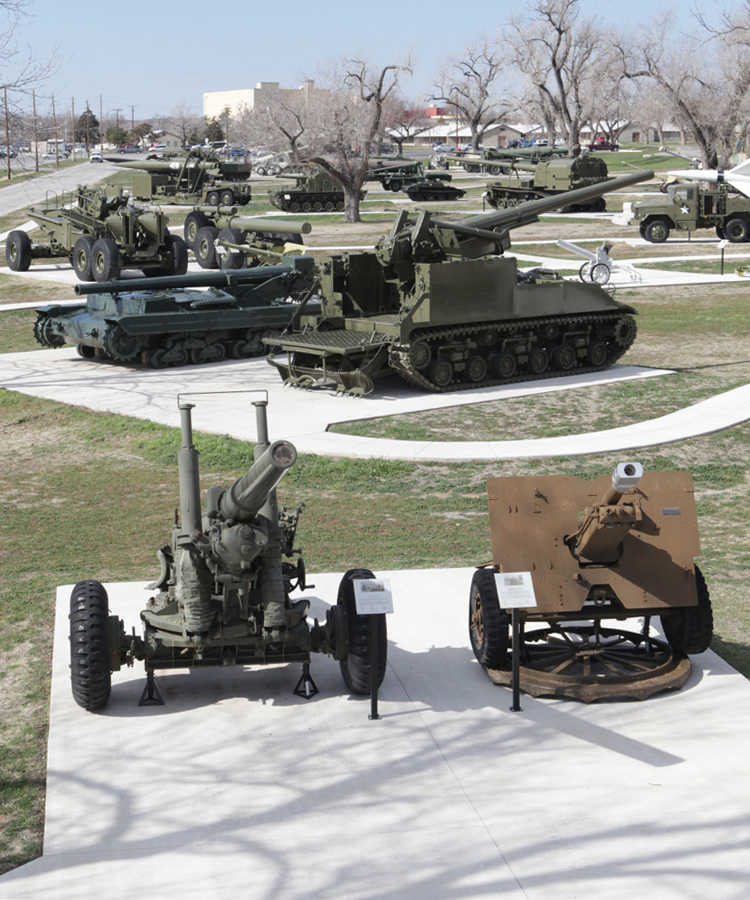
Next door to the Artillery Museum is a new Artillery Park with artillery pieces from throughout the world.

The federal government allotted the Kiowa, Comanche, and Apache Reservation in 1901, opening much of the land to non-Native settlement. During July, 29,000 homesteaders registered at Fort Sill for the land lottery. On 6 August, the town of Lawton sprang up and quickly grew to become the third-largest city in Oklahoma.

The decline in Indigenous military resistance during this time shifted the mission of Fort Sill from cavalry to field artillery. During the 1890s, the post declined in importance and was considered for closure, with the land being given to the Chiricahua Apaches; the first artillery battery arrived at Fort Sill in 1902, and the last cavalry regiment departed in May 1907. The artillery units required more facilities, so plans were made to replace the original structures with modern buildings. However, William H. Taft, then Secretary of War, intervened to save the original buildings. He ordered the fort to expand to the south and west.

An order on 23 November 1910 sparked the upbringing of the Field Artillery School at Fort Sill. The School of Fire for the Field Artillery was founded at Fort Sill in 1911 and continues today as the world-renowned U.S. Army Field Artillery School. At various times, Fort Sill has also served as home to the Infantry School of Musketry, the School for Aerial Observers, the Artillery Officers Candidate School (Robinson Barracks), the Air Service Flying School, and the Army Aviation School. In 1917, the Henry Post Army Airfield was constructed for artillery observation and spotting.

During World War I, Montgomery M. Macomb, a brigadier general and career artillery officer who had retired in 1916, was recalled to active duty to command Fort Sill and oversee the schools and training programs that prepared soldiers for combat in France.

Fort Sill was once the site of a large Boot Hill cemetery. Many soldiers who were killed during the Indian wars were buried there, as were multiple outlaws or their victims.

=== Early aviation at Fort Sill ===
The history of Fort Sill also contains the birthplace of US combat aviation, located at the parade field at the Old Post Quadrangle at Fort Sill.

In 1915 the 1st Aero Squadron, led by Captain Benjamin D. Foulois arrived at Fort Sill. Their first task was to uncrate their new unassembled airplanes and assemble them. Upon completion, they pushed their Curtiss JN-2 planes downhill to the Polo field. On 10 August, they made their first flights.

The first airplane accident occurred two days later, on 12 August 1915. Lt. Rondondo B. Sutton, the pilot, was hospitalized. His passenger, Captain George H. Knox, the paymaster of Fort Sill, was killed. According to the Lawton Constitution newspaper article, there was a large crowd of civilians at the field to see the aircraft in flight – and were, consequently, there to see the results of the accident. According to the newspaper article, the large crowd of men, women, and children were horrified. Soon after, on 5 September, another plane was lost in a second crash, after which Cpt. Foulois grounded the remaining planes out of concern for safety.

The squadron began trials with the field artillery to see if they could perform reconnaissance of field position. The results were disappointing, primarily due to inadequate equipment. New equipment was ordered, and by 14 October, operations with the field artillery had resumed. On 22 October, Lt. T.D. Milling made the first two flights to test aerial photography using a Brock camera. On 6 November, the squadron successfully made a photo mosaic of 42 plates.

On 19 November 1915 the squadron left Fort Sill for the first ever squadron cross-country trip that was conducted by the U.S. Army. They flew six Curtiss JN-3 biplanes to Fort Sam Houston, Texas, a total of 439 miles (706.5 km) in a cross-country distance flight. The aviators were supported by a trail of heavy trucks and their mechanics on motorcycles due to the biplanes having unreliable engines. The flight arrived on 26 November without any major incidents delaying them.

The squadron was kept in Texas because of tension along the U.S.-Mexico border. Mexican revolutionary Pancho Villa felt betrayed that the U.S. government recognized Venustiano Carranza's Mexican government. Villa began to attack Americans in northern Mexico. On 9 March 1916, Villa's troops attacked Columbus, N.M., and a detachment of the 13th Cavalry. The town was burned, and the Americans suffered eighteen soldiers and civilians killed and eight wounded. President Woodrow Wilson ordered Gen. John J. Pershing to lead 4,800 men into Mexico to capture Villa. Villa was never killed but did receive a wound from being shot by one of his men while being chased by troops under General Pershing. (See Pershing's diary on the expedition.)

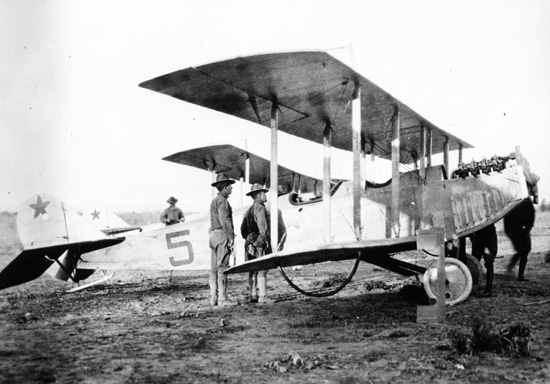
1st Aero Squadron Curtiss JN-3 with red star "fin flash" national insignia

The 1st Aero Squadron was part of that army. They transferred to Casas Grandes in Mexico and began duties flying reconnaissance, delivering mail and dispatches, and transporting senior officers, all marked with a red five-pointed star on their rudders for their American national insignia from 19 March 1916, onwards. This was the earliest known instance of a "national insignia" of any sort used on American military aircraft. The simple military-related tasks the early Curtiss biplanes were performing were more than their airframes could handle. They simply did not have enough power to fly over the mountains of northern Mexico due to altitude limitations and poor speed. They were forced to fly the passes between the mountains which limited their visibility. One rainstorm poured nearly a foot of water into the cockpit of Cpt. Foulois' craft and flooded out his engine. He successfully managed to land his plane without power. Every landing in Mexico was carried out in hostile territory. Many pilots were cut off from friendly lines with little hope of rescue.

The squadron flew 540 missions in Mexico – averaging 36 miles (58 km) per mission. After six weeks, the planes were no longer able to fly due to crashes or mechanical failures. On 20 April 1916, the Army ordered the squadron back to Columbus, N.M. Their only real military success was finding a lost and thirsty cavalry column.

The 1st Aero Squadron received new airplanes, but the factory hurriedly packed them, all missing parts and requiring significant modifications. The squadron was deployed in April 1917 to the East Coast to prepare for the war on Germany. It was the first U.S. Military Aviation Unit to be deployed overseas. It arrived in France as part of the American Expeditionary Force in World War I. Today, the 1st Reconnaissance Squadron of the U.S. Air Force at Beale AFB traces its unit heritage to the 1st Aero Squadron.

=== Henry Post Army Airfield ===
In August 1917, Capt. H.R. Eyrich surveyed a new airfield location at Fort Sill and established Henry Post Army Airfield (named after 2nd Lt. Henry Post, who was killed in a plane crash in San Diego in 1914). The field occupies a small plateau about a mile south of the main post cantonment area. Construction immediately began on wooden hangars, offices, and officer housing. As the U.S. entered World War I, the airfield was used to train aerial observers for the field artillery.

On 29 August 1917, the 3rd Aero Squadron left Fort Sam Houston for Fort Sill with 12 Curtiss R4 airplanes under the command of Capt. Weir. It was re-designated as Squadron A, Post Field, Okla., on 22 July 1918. It was demobilized due to the end of World War I on 2 January 1919. Today, the 3rd Flying Training Squadron, which traces its lineage to the 3rd Aero Squadron, trains pilots at Vance Air Force Base, Enid, Okla.

The 4th Aero Squadron was also sent to Post Airfield that summer. The 4th operated as an observation school for the field artillery until demobilized on 2 Jan 1919. Today, the 394th Combat Training Squadron at Whiteman AFB, Mo., traces its lineage to the 4th Aero Squadron.

As the Army's aviation assets grew, various units were created, inactivated, assigned, and reassigned. In 1922, Fort Sill was considered the busiest airport in the U.S.

Aviation at Fort Sill added lighter-than-air ships to its inventory when Company A, 1st Balloon Squadron, arrived on 5 September 1917, from the Balloon School in Omaha, Nebraska. The company split to form the 25th and 26th Balloon Companies on 16 February – 2 April 1918. A Balloon Corps Training School was set up at Post Field in 1918 to meet the demand for trained aerial observers for field artillery. During World War I, the school trained 751 officers and created 89 companies, of which 33 were deployed to Europe.

The school used balloons and fixed-wing aircraft for aerial observation. In the 1920s and 30s, sausage-shaped "captured" balloons and spherical-shaped "free" balloons were used. The balloonists were trained on free flight on the "free" balloons, but they had to stay within 50 miles (80.5 km) of the post and 8,000 feet (2,438 m).

The tethered or "captured" balloons were for observation only. They were connected to winch trucks on the ground by cable and transported at speeds as high as 60 miles an hour (96.6 km/h). They were inflated with hydrogen and operated at a maximum height of 4,300 feet (1,310.6 m). They observed and relayed fire-corrective information to special operation trucks.

At this time, balloon companies were a corps-level asset. The Army of World War I included an aero squadron in every corps. Other auxiliary units for a corps were an anti-aircraft machine-gun and anti-aircraft artillery battalion, a remount depot a bakery company, a troop transport train, a telegraph battalion, a field signal battalion, a photo section, and a sales commissary unit.

Self-propelled balloons were developed at Post Field in 1937. These balloons were designed to be powered to an observation point, their motors removed, and observation baskets attached. The famous balloon hangar moved from Moffett Field to Fort Sill in 1934 and was intended to house dirigibles. The unique "cross" on the side of the building has no religious significance—it is part of an air circulation system designed to dry balloon fabric and parachutes.

Balloons were assigned to the field until 1941. The most famous balloon pilot trained at Fort Sill was Gen. Barksdale Hamlett, Jr. This four-star general was the commandant of the American sector of Berlin during the 1958 Berlin Crisis, became the vice chief of staff of the Army, played a crucial role in the Cuban Missile Crisis and in the escalation of the Vietnam War.

One of the U.S. Air Force's most advanced technical units, the 1st Airborne Command and Control Squadron at Offutt Air Force Base, Nebraska., traces its lineage through the 1st Balloon Company.

==== An enduring legacy – Fort Sill aviation ====
The 44th Aero Squadron was assigned to support the Field Artillery School at Post Field in August 1922. It was reassigned on 31 July 1927, to the Air Corps Training Center. The unit today is not active. It was replaced by the 88th Observation Squadron, which moved from Brooks Field, Texas, to Fort Sill in September 1928. The 88th left Post Field in 1931, and today is the 436th Training Squadron out of Dyess AFB, Texas.

In the 1930s, the WPA and Army built several new permanent structures to replace the World War I-era tar paper buildings. Building 4908, the aircraft maintenance hangar built in 1932, is the oldest building at the airfield.

==== Field artillery officers and the Olympics ====
Fort Sill, Oklahoma, and the field artillery branch received their only Olympic medals in the 1932 Los Angeles Olympics.

Lieutenant Richard Mayo, the first medal came from an unexpected source – a wiry field artillery lieutenant who participated in the pentathlon. In those years for the pentathlon, the competitors completed five events on consecutive days (horse riding, fencing, pistol shooting, a 200-meter freestyle swim and a 3-kilometer cross-country run). In the pentathlon, competitors are ranked in the order they finish in each event, and all their rankings are added to determine the gold medalist. The lower your points, the better.

Mayo started well, finishing second in the horse-riding phase behind Bo Lindman of Sweden. Lindman was a favorite, as he previously won gold in the 1924 Summer Olympics in Paris.

The next day, Mayo finished well in fencing as he tied with Elemer Somfay of Hungary at 4 1/2. Lindman was ranked 2 1/2 in fencing, so he held onto the lead with just 3 1/2 points. At the end of phase two, the unheralded Mayo was second with 6 1/2 points.

The shooting results put Mayo in the lead. He finished first and had a total of 7 1/2 points. Lindman finished 19th, so the Swede now had 21 1/2 points. Carlo Simonetti of Italy came out of the first three rounds with 17 points. Another Swede, Johan Gabriel Oxenstierna, who finished 14th in fencing, brought himself back into competition by finishing second in the shooting phase. Oxentierna had 20 points. With just two events left, the standings were Mayo-7 1//2, Simonetti-17, Oxentierna-20, Lindman-21 1/2.

Mayo and Simonetti both finished in the pack in the swimming phase – Mayo finished 14, and Simonetti was 15. Meanwhile, the Swedes finished 5 and 9 in the swim and were in striking distance of Mayo's lead. Mayo was 3 1/2 points ahead of Oxentierna and four points ahead of Thofelt with just the final run.

Charles Percy Digby Legard and Jeffrey McDougall of Great Britain finished one-two in the run, but Lindman finished fourth for a total of 35 1/2 points. Oxenstierna's seventh-place finish brought his total points to 32. Meanwhile, Mayo finished 17th, and, with 38 1/2 points, took the bronze medal.

Richard Mayo remained in the Army and made it his career. During World War II, he commanded the 15th Army in combat in France and Germany. Mayo retired in 1956 as a brigadier general

Lieutenant Edwin Argo

LOS ANGELES, 11 August 1932 – Three U.S. Army equestrian team members – Maj. Harry Chamberlin, Capt. Edwin Y. Argo and Lieut. Earl F. Thomson - started the Three-Day Event at the 1932 Olympics. The three faced the best military riders of Holland, Sweden, Japan, and Mexico. On the first day of the event, all riders faced a training test. The second day was an endurance ride of 22 1/2 miles (36.2 km) over five different courses, and the last day was stadium jumping, where they rode a course of 12 jumps at a 14-mile per hour (22.5 km/h) gait.

Argo, the only field artillery officer in this part of the competition, rode Honolulu Tom Boy in a remarkable performance without a fault at a jump during the stadium jumping—the only rider without a fault that day. The U.S. team led from the start and was described by the 1932 Field Artillery Journal as a "glorious achievement for our riders and horses," as they took the gold medal in the team competition. In the individual standings, Thomson took the silver for the U.S., Chamberlin finished fourth, and Argo eighth. (taken from the Field Artillery Journal, Sept.-Oct. 1932). At that time, Argo was assigned to the 1st Field Artillery at Fort Sill, Okla.

==== World War II to present ====
By 1940, the Field Artillery School had permission to train its fixed-wing pilots as field artillery spotters. The Army Air Corps turned Post Field over to the FA School, and the facility began to swarm with Grasshoppers and Bird Dogs (single-engine small spotter airplanes) – part of the Department of Air Training. (Cessna L-19/O-1 Bird Dog aircraft were not placed in military inventories until 1950.)

What was originally a five-week course was expanded, and special primary flight schools for prospective field artillery pilots were set up at Pittsburg, Kansas, and Denton, Texas. After attending one of these primary schools, pilots went to Post Field for their advanced training, which included short field procedures and observer training.

By the war's end, 262 pilots and 2,262 mechanics were trained at Post Field.

In 1942, Fort Sill held approximately 700 Japanese Americans interned by the Department of Justice – mostly non-citizen Issei who had been arrested as spies and fifth columnists, despite a lack of evidence supporting the charges against them. 350 of these internees were transferred from Fort Missoula, Montana. One of them, Kanesaburo Oshima, was killed by a guard when he suffered a mental break and attempted to escape on 12 May. In addition to the Japanese American inmates, Fort Sill held three German prisoners of war.

Advancements in air defense artillery and radar systems during the Cold War made the slow-moving Grasshoppers and Bird Dogs easy targets – especially in forward areas. Because of this vulnerability, they were phased out during the Vietnam War. During that conflict, 469 O-1 Bird Dogs were lost to all causes. 284 of these were lost by the Army.

The Army Ground Forces Air Training School (later designated the Army Aviation School) was established at Post Field on 7 December 1945. In October 1948, pilot training for helicopters H25 and H13 began. The first warrant officer class began in 1951.

The AGF Air Training School was transferred to Fort Rucker in 1954, but Post Field still had several helicopter units that called it home. By the early 1960s, the 34th Artillery Brigade was supervising the post's increased number of artillery battalions. The brigade was tasked to "support with cannon artillery the requirements of the Artillery and Missile School."

In 1963, the 1st Aerial Artillery Group (Provisional) was organized to test equipping CH-34 helicopters with rocket pods attached to each side. The rockets converted a transport aircraft, an easy target in most combat situations, into a sophisticated flying weapon capable of direct or indirect fire. It was the ancestor of the Cheyenne and Long Bow attack helicopters of today.

The 295th Aviation Company. (Heavy Helicopter) was established at Fort Sill in the 60s. The unit was assigned ten Skycrane CH-54A helicopters. The unit also had a UH-1H administrative aircraft; later, an OH-58 joined the unit. It was the mother company to the 355th Aviation Company (that deployed to Vietnam in 1968–69) and the 273rd Aviation Company (that deployed to Vietnam 1967–1968.) In Dec. 1969, the unit was deployed to Finthen Army Airfield near Mainz, Germany. Today, the company is designated F Company, 159th Aviation Regiment (Heavy Lift Helicopter Company), and is equipped with CH-47 Chinooks.

Post Field is the oldest continually operating airfield in the U.S. Army.

Former marine biologist Stephen Hillenburg was born at Fort Sill in 1961. As an animator, he created the long-running children's animated television series "SpongeBob SquarePants" until his death on 26 November 2018.

==== Artillery Half Section ====
Fort Sill's Artillery Half Section is a mounted unit that re-creates the World War I-era field artillery and horse-drawn field guns. The Artillery Half Section is Fort Sill's equine Army special ceremonies unit. The half section is typically manned by eight soldiers and eight horses. The half section is frequently requested to demonstrate their apparatus and skills at parades and other community events.

==== Historic recognition ====
Fort Sill was declared a National Historic Landmark in 1960. Fort Sill itself, and multiple locations within Fort Sill, are on the National Register of Historic Places listings in Comanche County, Oklahoma. Fort Sill is currently the home to three museums; The Fort Sill National Historic Landmark and Museum, comprising the original frontier fort and the thirty-four historic structures, making it the most complete original Indian Wars era frontier fort in existence. The U.S. Army Field Artillery Museum was opened in 2009 and houses a diverse collection of artillery pieces and related artifacts on exhibit to tell the story of the history of the Field Artillery Branch. The U.S. Army Air Defense Artillery Museum is housed in temporary facilities, having moved from Fort Bliss, TX in 2010. The ADA Museum houses a vast collection of Anti-aircraft and Air Defense Artillery artifacts and exhibits to tell the history and heritage of the Air Defense Branch. All museums are free of charge to the public and open Tuesday to Saturday, 9 am to 5 pm.

==== Cemeteries ====
There are various cemeteries on Fort Sill, with their own histories and significance.

The most famous is the Post Cemetery, at the intersection of Macomb and Geronimo Roads. Many Indian chiefs who signed the Medicine Lodge Treaty came to rest at Fort Sill Post Cemetery. Unlike most cemeteries of its day, it was never segregated. Troopers of the 10th Cavalry Regiment, known as the "Buffalo Soldiers" who died at Fort Sill lie next to these chiefs. Officers, soldiers, spouses and children lie side-by-side regardless of their race or social status.

The most famous person buried at Fort Sill is the Apache warrior known as Geronimo. Geronimo is buried in the Apache Cemetery on East Range. Because his grave is off the beaten path, the route is marked with signs. Others buried at Fort Sill include Kiowa Chief Satanta, and Comanche Chief Quanah Parker.

The most controversial cemetery on post lies under Henry Post Army Airfield. The old Indian Agency Cemetery, which includes both Comanche and white remains, is located just south of the last hangar at the airfield. In the 1950s, in order to reduce the hazard of airplanes or helicopters landing or parking in the area, Army engineers took down all the gravestones and covered the entire area with a four-inch cover of earth. The earliest known still-existing listing of those buried at this cemetery is known as the "1917 Harper's List." For many years, the cemetery sat forgotten by history. In 1984 Towanna Spivey, an archeologist and curator of the Fort Sill National Landmark and Museum, completed a scientific investigation of records and the site. He identified 64 persons buried in that cemetery by name, but another 50 graves were listed as unknown. Out of respect, none of the remains have ever been dug up or disturbed.

== Activities today ==
A detachment of the United States Marine Corps, consisting of a firing battery and commanded by a colonel, is stationed at Fort Sill. Referred to as the MARDET, the detachment works with the Field Artillery School to train Marine artillerymen. Marines also serve as gunnery and fire support instructors at the Army Basic Officer Leader Course & Marine Field Artillery Officer Basic Course, and as small group leaders at the Field Artillery Captains' Career Course. All Marine artillery officers attend the Field Artillery School, but are trained in separate classes from their Army counterparts.

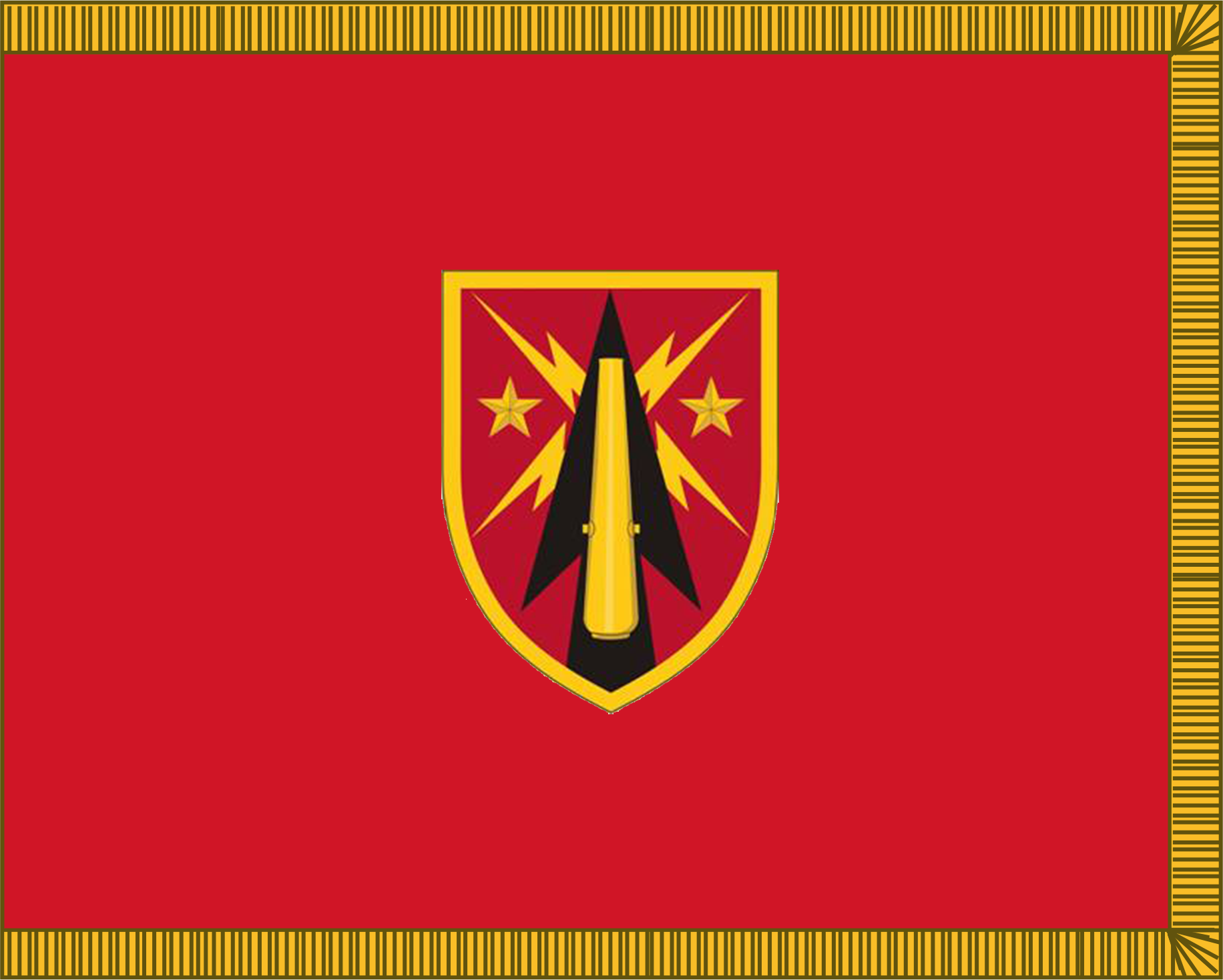
US Army Fires Center of Excellence Flag

The 77th Army Band (Special designation: "The Pride of Fort Sill") is part of the Fires Center of Excellence. It was originally organized on 1 March 1907, at Fort Du Pont, Delaware as the 13th Band, Coast Artillery.

Another special detachment is the Field Artillery Half Section, an eight-man group representative of the "flying artillery" which was drawn by a team of horses (the Half Section has eight horses – all named after former commanding generals of Fort Sill) around the turn of the 20th century. The Half Section was established in 1969 to celebrate Fort Sill's Centennial. The soldiers are volunteers for the show group, while the horses, their equipment and transportation are provided through charitable donations. The popular Half Section has appeared in regional parades, local festivities, change of command ceremonies and a presidential inauguration parade.

In June 2019, it was announced that the base was to be used for temporary shelter for recent immigrant children. The same facility was used in 2014 by the Obama administration for the same purpose. On 28 July 2019, the U.S. Department of Health and Human Services announced cancellation of preparations due to public criticism from local communities and a decline in the number of referrals of undocumented youth.

Fort Sill also runs many events for training to keep Marines and soldiers ready for combat missions. Units take part in many drills, instructions, exercise, and training throughout the day. Troops work together throughout many realistic field condition scenarios to reenact what can really happen on a battlefield. The regular use of these activities allows Fort Sill to be an important factor to improving the Army's artillery skills and also future readiness.

== Tenant units ==
- 31st Air Defense Artillery Brigade (31st ADAB)
  - 3rd Battalion, 2nd Air Defense Artillery Regiment (3-2nd ADAR)
  - 4th Battalion, 3rd Air Defense Artillery Regiment (4-3rd ADAR)
  - 5th Battalion, 5th Air Defense Artillery Regiment (5-5th ADAR)
- 75th Field Artillery Brigade (75th FAB)
  - 2nd Battalion, 4th Field Artillery Regiment (2-4th FAR)
  - 3rd Battalion, 13th Field Artillery Regiment (3-13th FAR)
  - 1st Battalion, 14th Field Artillery Regiment (1-14th FAR)
  - 2nd Battalion, 18th Field Artillery Regiment (2-18th FAR)
  - 2nd Battalion, 20th Field Artillery Regiment (2-20th FAR)
  - 100th Brigade Support Battalion (100th BSB)
  - 258th Signal Company
- United States Army Field Artillery School (USA FAS)
  - 428th Field Artillery Brigade (428th FAB)
    - 2nd Battalion, 2nd Field Artillery Regiment (2-2nd FAR)
    - 1st Battalion, 30th Field Artillery Regiment (1-30th FAR)
    - 1st Battalion, 78th Field Artillery Regiment (1-78th FAR)
- United States Army Air Defense Artillery School (USA ADAS)
  - 30th Air Defense Artillery Brigade (30th ADAB)
    - 2nd Battalion, 6th Air Defense Artillery Regiment (2-6th ADAR)
    - 3rd Battalion, 6th Air Defense Artillery Regiment (3-6th ADAR)
- 434th Field Artillery Brigade (Basic Combat Training)
  - 1st Battalion, 19th Field Artillery Regiment- five basic combat training batteries
  - 1st Battalion, 22nd Field Artillery Regiment - five basic combat training batteries
  - 1st Battalion, 31st Field Artillery Regiment- six basic combat training batteries
  - 1st Battalion, 40th Field Artillery Regiment- five basic combat training batteries
  - 1st Battalion, 79th Field Artillery Regiment- five basic combat training batteries
  - 95th Adjutant General Battalion (Reception)
- 95th Infantry Division (Initial Entry Training)
  - 1st Brigade (Initial Entry Training), Fort Sill, Oklahoma
    - 1-354 Military Police Battalion (OSUT), Tulsa, Oklahoma
    - 2-354 (Basic Combat Training), Grand Prairie, Texas
    - 1-355 (Basic Combat Training), Round Rock, Texas
    - 2-377 (Basic Combat Training), Lincoln, Nebraska
    - 3-378 (Basic Combat Training), Norman, Oklahoma
  - 2nd Brigade (Initial Entry Training), Vancouver, Washington
    - 2-413 (Basic Combat Training), Riverside, California
    - 1-415 (Basic Combat Training), Phoenix, Arizona
    - 3-415 (Basic Combat Training), Fairchild AFB, Washington
  - 3rd Brigade (Initial Entry Training), Beaver Dam, WI
    - 1-320 Military Police Battalion (OSUT), Abingdon, Virginia
    - 1-330 (Basic Combat Training), Fort Wayne, Indiana
    - 2-330 Engineer Battalion (OSUT), Arlington Heights, Illinois
    - 3-354 (Basic Combat Training), Milwaukee, Wisconsin
    - 1-390 Engineer Battalion (OSUT), Amherst, New York

== Geography ==
=== Climate ===
Climate is characterized by relatively high temperatures and evenly distributed precipitation throughout the year with the exception of increased precipitation in late spring and late summer. The Köppen Climate Classification subtype for this climate is "Cfa" (Humid Subtropical Climate).

Climate data for Fort Sill, Oklahoma
Month	Jan	Feb	Mar	Apr	May	Jun	Jul	Aug	Sep	Oct	Nov	Dec	Year
Mean daily maximum °F (°C)	49.9 (9.9)	55.0 (12.8)	64.4 (18.0)	74.3 (23.5)	81.8 (27.7)	89.9 (32.2)	95.8 (35.4)	94.9 (34.9)	85.9 (29.9)	75.7 (24.3)	63.2 (17.3)	52.3 (11.3)	73.6 (23.1)
Mean daily minimum °F (°C)	23.7 (−4.6)	28.7 (−1.8)	38.0 (3.3)	49.4 (9.7)	58.2 (14.6)	66.7 (19.3)	71.0 (21.7)	69.7 (20.9)	61.9 (16.6)	49.5 (9.7)	38.0 (3.3)	27.4 (−2.6)	48.5 (9.2)
Average precipitation inches (mm)	1.1 (28)	1.3 (33)	2.1 (53)	2.4 (61)	4.9 (120)	3.6 (91)	1.9 (48)	2.2 (56)	3.7 (94)	3 (76)	1.8 (46)	1.3 (33)	29.3 (740)
Source 1: weather.com
Source 2: Weatherbase.com

== Education ==
Dependents on-post are in the boundary for Lawton Public Schools. Zoned schools for residents are Freedom Elementary School, Central Middle School, and Lawton High School.

== Notable people ==
Notable people from Fort Sill include:

- Michel Aoun, 13th President of Lebanon
- Mel Brooks, actor, comedian, writer, Broadway and Hollywood producer
- Martin Ginsburg, tax lawyer, husband of Ruth Bader Ginsburg, stationed at Ft. Sill as a young man
- Ruth Bader Ginsburg, US Supreme Court justice, lived at Ft. Sill with her husband, Martin Ginsburg
- Joseph Grinnell, zoologist
- Stephen Hillenburg, marine biologist, animator, and voice actor. Creator of SpongeBob SquarePants
- Cassie Jaye, actress and film director
- Judith Lowry, actress
- Peter McRobbie, actor
- Dave Nelson, baseball player
- Tom Platz, bodybuilder
- Tomassa, translator
- Mary Pope Osborne, children's author
- Terry Serpico, actor
- Steve Wilson, football player
- South Korean president Park Chung Hee was stationed here for a semester in 1954.
- The Joint Fires Observer classroom building at Fort Sill is named in honor of Sgt. 1st Class Kristoffer Domeij.
- Harry S. Truman, thirty-third president of the United States. As a Missouri National Guardsman during World War I, he was stationed here for training. According to historian David McCullough, Truman became friends with his future Kansas City business partner, Eddie Jacobson, while at Ft. Sill. Truman, tasked with administering the PX for his unit, the 129th Field Artillery, partnered with Jacobson, a sergeant from Kansas City with retail experience, to run the exchange's day-to-day operations.

== See also ==
- List of National Historic Landmarks in Oklahoma
- National Register of Historic Places listings in Comanche County, Oklahoma
