= 22nd Field Artillery Regiment =

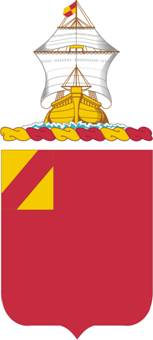
- Coat of arms
- Active: 1918
- Country: United States
- Branch: Army
- Type: Field artillery
- Mottos: Labore et Honore (With Industry and Honor).

Insignia
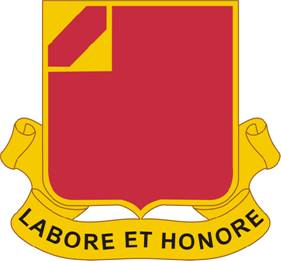
- Distinctive unit insignia

The 22nd Field Artillery Regiment is a Field Artillery regiment of the United States Army.

== History ==
The 22d Field Artillery Regiment was constituted on 18 May 1918 as Battery A, Separate Battalion of Mountain Artillery. The unit was organized at Corozal Canal Zone on 10 July 1918. The unit was redesignated on 1 July 1921 as Battery A, 22d Field Artillery.

On 15 September 1921, the unit was inactivated in the Canal Zone. The unit was assigned to the 4th Division from 23 July 1929 until 7 December 1929. The battalion was then assigned to the 6th Division until 2 October 1939. On 13 January 1941, the unit was redesignated as Battery A, 22d Field Artillery Battalion. On 15 April 1941, the unit was activated at Pine Camp, New York. The unit was reorganized and redesignated as Battery A, 22d Armored Field Artillery Battalion.

During this time, the battalion participated in the invasion of Normandy, the effort in Northern France, the campaign in the Ardennes-Alsace (the Battle of the Bulge), and the effort in Central Europe. The unit was converted and redesignated on 1 May 1946 as Troop A, 22d Constabulary Squadron, an element of the 14th Constabulary Regiment. The unit was inactivated on 20 May 1949 in Hersfeld, Germany; concurrently converted and redesignated as Battery A, 22d Armored Field Artillery Battalion. The battalion was assigned to the 4th Armored Division on 25 February 1953. The battalion as next activated on 15 June 1954 at Fort Hood, Texas.

The unit was reorganized and redesignated 1 April 1957 as Headquarters and Headquarters Battery, 1st Howitzer Battalion, 22d Field Artillery and assigned to the 1st Armored Division. The unit was redesignated on 1 September 1971 as the 1st Battalion, 22d Field Artillery. The battalion was inactivated on 16 January 1988 in Germany and relieved from assignment to the 1st Armored Division.

On 15 September 1996, the battalion was reactivated as the 1st Battalion, 22d Field Artillery within the Field Artillery Training Center, Fort Sill, Oklahoma with the formal ceremonies for the activation occurring on 11 October 1997.

On 8 May 2008, the battalion reflagged as the 1st Battalion, 22nd Field Artillery within the 428th Field Artillery Brigade, Fort Sill, Oklahoma. During this time, it assumed the BOLC Phase II mission where it developed, trained and mentored the future junior officers of the Army. In that short amount of time the unit trained more than 8,000 second lieutenants from all branches of the Army. The battalion deactivated on 9 April 2010.

== Distinctive unit insignia ==
- Description

A Gold color metal and enamel device 1 inch (2.54 cm) in height consisting of a shield blazoned: Gules, on a canton Or a bend sinister of the field. Attached below the shield a Gold scroll inscribed “LABORE ET HONORE” in Black letters.

- Symbolism

The shield is scarlet for Artillery. The transfer of personnel from the 4th Field Artillery when the 22nd Field Artillery was organized is indicated by the canton, which is the shield of the 4th Field Artillery coat of arms.

- Background

The distinctive unit insignia was originally approved for the 22nd Field Artillery Regiment on 19 May 1932. It was redesignated for the 22nd Field Artillery Battalion on 24 April 1941. It was redesignated for the 22nd Constabulary Squadron on 4 December 1946. It was redesignated for the 22nd Armored Field Artillery Battalion on 30 July 1954. It was redesignated for the 22nd Artillery Regiment on 28 January 1958. The insignia was redesignated effective 1 September 1971, for the 22nd Field Artillery Regiment.

== Coat of arms ==
- Blazon
- Shield

Gules, on a canton Or a bend sinister of the field.

- Crest

On a wreath of the colors Or and Gules a Spanish galleon Or in full sail affronté Proper. Motto LABORE ET HONORE (With Industry and Honor).

- Symbolism
- Shield

The shield is scarlet for Artillery. The transfer of personnel from the 4th Field Artillery when the 22nd Field Artillery was organized is indicated by the canton, which is the shield of the 4th Field Artillery coat of arms.

- Crest

The crest is taken from the arms of the Panama Canal, indicating the place the 22nd Field Artillery was organized.

- Background

The coat of arms was originally approved for the 22nd Field Artillery Regiment on 19 May 1932. It was redesignated for the 22nd Field Artillery Battalion on 23 April 1941. It was redesignated for the 22nd Constabulary Squadron on 3 December 1946. It was redesignated for the 22nd Armored Field Artillery Battalion on 30 July 1954. It was redesignated for the 22nd Artillery Regiment on 28 January 1958. The insignia was redesignated effective 1 September 1971, for the 22nd Field Artillery Regiment.

== Current configuration ==
- 1st Battalion, 22nd Field Artillery Regiment (Serves as a Basic Combat Training battalion at Fort Sill, Oklahoma)
- 2nd Battalion, 22nd Field Artillery Regiment
- 3rd Battalion, 22nd Field Artillery Regiment
- 4th Battalion, 22nd Field Artillery Regiment
- 5th Battalion, 22nd Field Artillery Regiment
- 6th Battalion, 22nd Field Artillery Regiment

== See also ==
- Field Artillery Branch (United States)
- U.S. Army Coast Artillery Corps
