= 40th Field Artillery Regiment =

US military unit

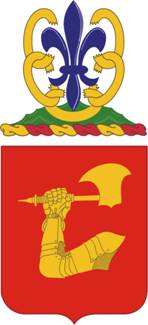
- Coat of arms
- Active: 1918
- Country: United States
- Branch: United States Army
- Type: Field artillery
- Motto: ALL FOR ONE

Insignia
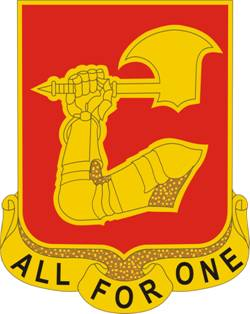
- Distinctive unit insignia

The 40th Field Artillery Regiment is a field artillery regiment of the United States Army, first Constituted 5 July 1918 in the National Army (USA).

== Lineage ==
Constituted 5 July 1918 in the National Army as the 40th Field Artillery and assigned to the 14th Division

Organized 10 August 1918 at Camp Custer, Michigan

Demobilized 6 February 1919 at Camp Custer, Michigan

Reconstituted 1 October 1933 in the Regular Army the 40th Field Artillery

Activated 4 June 1941 at Camp Roberts, California

Regiment broken up 1 March 1943 and its elements reorganized and redesignated as follows:

Headquarters and Headquarters Battery as Headquarters and Headquarters Battery, 40th Field Artillery Group 1st and 2d Battalions as the 974th and 975th Field Artillery Battalions, respectively

After 1 March 1943, the above units underwent changes as follows:

Headquarters and Headquarters Battery, 40th Field Artillery Group, inactivated 15 March 1946 in Germany Activated 26 April 1951 at Camp Carson, Colorado Redesignated 9 September 1957 as Headquarters and Headquarters Battery, 40th Field Artillery Missile Group Redesignated 20 July 1958 as Headquarters and Headquarters Battery, 40th Artillery Group Inactivated 16 September 1962 in Germany

974th Field Artillery Battalion inactivated 10 January 1946 at Camp Patrick Henry, Virginia Redesignated 5 February 1947 as the 509th Field Artillery Battalion Redesignated 25 June 1948 as the 509th Armored Field Artillery Battalion and assigned to the 3d Armored Division Activated 30 July 1948 at Fort Knox, Kentucky Inactivated 1 October 1957 in Germany and relieved from assignment to the 3d Armored Division

975th Field Artillery Battalion inactivated 13 February 1946 at Camp Kilmer, New Jersey Redesignated 5 February 1947 as the 510th Field Artillery Battalion Activated 1 February 1949 in Austria Redesignated 20 August 1956 as the 510th Field Artillery Rocket Battalion Inactivated 1 June 1958 in Italy

Headquarters and Headquarters Battery, 40th Artillery Group; 509th Armored Field Artillery Battalion; and the 510th Field Artillery Rocket Battalion consolidated, reorganized, and redesignated 16 September 1962 as the 40th Artillery, a parent regiment under the Combat Arms Regimental System

Redesignated 1 September 1971 as the 40th Field Artillery

Withdrawn 16 September 1987 from the Combat Arms Regimental System and reorganized under the United States Army Regimental System with headquarters in Germany

Transferred 15 January 1996 to the United States Army Training and Doctrine Command

== Distinctive unit insignia ==
- Description

A Gold color metal and enamel device 1 1/16 inches (2.7 cm) in height overall consisting of a shield blazoned: Gules, a dexter arm embowed in armour, the upper part in fess grasping a Lochaber axe fesswise Or. Attached below and to the sides of the shield a Gold scroll inscribed “ALL FOR ONE” in Black letters.

- Symbolism

The shield is red for Artillery. The arm in the striking position signifies the readiness of the organization.

- Background

The distinctive unit insignia was originally approved for the 40th Field Artillery Regiment on 9 March 1942. It was redesignated for the 509th Armored Field Artillery Battalion on 9 March 1950. It was redesignated for the 40th Artillery Regiment on 20 November 1958. The insignia was redesignated for the 40th Field Artillery Regiment effective 1 September 1971.

== Coat of arms ==
- Blazon
  - Shield: Gules, a dexter arm embowed in armour, the upper part in fess grasping a Lochaber axe fesswise Or.
  - Crest: On a wreath Or and Gules, in front of a mound Vert a fleur-de-lis Azure within a chain of five broken links forming an oval opened at the top of the first.
  - Motto: ALL FOR ONE
- Symbolism
  - Shield: The shield is red for Artillery. The arm in the striking position signifies the readiness of the organization.
  - Crest: The five broken chain links symbolize the unit's five battle honors. The fleur-de-lis refers to the area of Europe where they fought in World War II. The color green alludes to hope and liberation.
- Background: The coat of arms was originally approved for the 40th Field Artillery Regiment on 29 March 1942. It was redesignated for the 509th Armored Field Artillery Battalion on 9 March 1950. It was redesignated for the 40th Artillery Regiment on 20 November 1958. It was amended to add a crest on 10 May 1967. The insignia was redesignated for the 40th Field Artillery Regiment effective 1 September 1971.

== Current configuration ==
- 1st Battalion 40th Field Artillery Regiment (United States) (Currently serving as a Basic Combat Training battalion at Fort Sill, Oklahoma.)
- 2nd Battalion 40th Field Artillery Regiment (United States)
- 3rd Battalion 40th Field Artillery Regiment (United States)
- 4th Battalion 40th Field Artillery Regiment (United States)
- 5th Battalion 40th Field Artillery Regiment (United States)
- 6th Battalion 40th Field Artillery Regiment (United States)

== Campaign participation credit ==
- World War II: Normandy; Northern France; Rhineland; Ardennes-Alsace; Central Europe
- Vietnam: Counteroffensive, Phase II; Counteroffensive, Phase III; Tet Counteroffensive; Counteroffensive, Phase IV; Counteroffensive, Phase V; Counteroffensive, Phase VI; Tet 69/Counteroffensive; Summer-Fall 1969; Winter-Spring 1970; Sanctuary Counteroffensive; Counteroffensive, Phase VII
- Southwest Asia: Defense of Saudi Arabia; Liberation and Defense of Kuwait; Cease-Fire

== Decorations ==
- Presidential Unit Citation (Navy) for VIETNAM 1966-1967
- Valorous Unit Award for SAIGON-LONG BINH
- Meritorious Unit Commendation (Army) for VIETNAM 1967-1968
- Meritorious Unit Commendation (Army) for VIETNAM 1968-1969
- Meritorious Unit Commendation (Army) for SOUTHWEST ASIA

== See also ==
- Field Artillery Branch (United States)
