= 79th Field Artillery Regiment =

US military unit

- Coat of arms
- Active: 1916
- Country: United States
- Branch: Army
- Type: Field artillery
- Motto: "Our Country – Our Regiment"

Commanders
- Notable commanders: Charles D. Rhodes

Insignia
- Distinctive unit insignia

The 79th Field Artillery Regiment is a field artillery regiment of the United States Army. First constituted 1916 in the Regular Army.

== History ==
=== Pershing ===
==== 2nd Missile Battalion, 79th Artillery ====
The 2nd Missile Battalion, 79th Artillery was organized at Fort Sill, Oklahoma, in February 1964. The battalion was to be equipped with the Pershing missile and deployed to South Korea.

The battalion underwent operational testing at Fort Wingate, New Mexico and fired missiles on 28 January 1965 and 3 February 1965. The 251st Ordnance Detachment was activated in November 1964 under the Ordnance Guided Missile School at Redstone Arsenal, Alabama and commanded by 2nd Lt. David M. McClellan. The 251st transferred to Fort Sill, Oklahoma, in January 1966 to support the 2/79th.

The Korean deployment was placed on hold and the battalion supported missile shoots from the 56th Artillery Group and the two German Air Force squadrons at Black Mesa Test Range, Blanding and Green River Launch Complex in Utah. The 2/79th was then scheduled for deployment in September 1968 but transport was retasked to provide troop shipments to Vietnam. The war in Vietnam escalated, the deployment was canceled and the 2/79th Artillery and 251st Ordnance were inactivated in 1968.

===== Commanders =====
- Lt. Col. Desmond Sveiven
- Lt. Col. Louis G. (Gus) Hergert, Jr.

== Lineage ==
- Constituted 1 July 1916 in the Regular Army as the 21st Cavalry
- Organized 1 June 1917 at Fort Riley, Kansas
- Converted and redesignated 1 November 1917 as the 79th Field Artillery
- Assigned 6 December 1917 to the 7th Division
- Inactivated 14 September 1921 at Camp Meade, Maryland, and relieved from assignment to the 7th Division
- Assigned 1 January 1930 to the 7th Division
- Relieved 16 October 1939 from assignment to the 7th Division
- 1st Battalion activated 1 June 1940 at Fort Bragg, North Carolina
- Regiment (less 1st Battalion) activated 1 June 1941 at Fort Bragg, North Carolina
- Regiment broken up 23 February 1943 and its elements reorganized and redesignated as follows:
  - Headquarters and Headquarters Battery as Headquarters and Headquarters Battery, 79th Field Artillery Group
  - 1st Battalion as the 697th Field Artillery Battalion
  - 2d Battalion as the 698th Field Artillery Battalion
- After 23 February 1943 the above units underwent changes as follows:
  - Headquarters and Headquarters Battery, 79th Field Artillery Group, inactivated 30 June 1946 in Germany
  - 697th Field Artillery Battalion inactivated 12 February 1946 at Camp Kilmer, New Jersey
- Redesignated 5 February 1947 as the 555th Field Artillery Battalion
- Activated 1 January 1949 in Korea
- Assigned 10 October 1954 to the 71st Infantry Division
- Inactivated 15 September 1956 at Fort Lewis, Washington
- Relieved 16 July 1957 from assignment to the 71st Infantry Division
- 698th Field Artillery Battalion inactivated 14 February 1946 at Camp Kilmer, New Jersey
- Redesignated 5 February 1947 as the 567th Field Artillery Battalion
- Activated 20 March 1951 at Camp Polk, Louisiana
- Inactivated 16 January 1956 in Germany
- Headquarters and Headquarters Battery, 79th Field Artillery Group, and the 555th and 567th Field Artillery Battalions consolidated, reorganized, and redesignated 16 July 1957 as the 79th Artillery, a parent regiment under the Combat Arms Regimental System
- Redesignated 1 September 1971 as the 79th Field Artillery
- Withdrawn 16 August 1995 from the Combat Arms Regimental System and reorganized under the United States Army Regimental System; concurrently assigned to the United States Army Training and Doctrine Command

== Heraldry ==
=== Distinctive unit insignia ===
Description: A gold color metal and enamel device 1 5/32 inches (2.9 cm) in height overall consisting of the shield and crest of the coat of arms.

Symbolism: The 21st Cavalry was organized in June 1917 from the 13th Cavalry, and converted into Field Artillery as the 79th, in November of the same year. Its original Cavalry character is shown by the color of the field, its Field Artillery service by the red bend. The canton shows a device from the badge of the 13th Cavalry, the parent organization. The regiment insignia in base is the shoulder sleeve insignia of the 7th Division with colors reversed, surrounded by a green band.

Background: The distinctive unit insignia was originally approved for the 79th Field Artillery Regiment on 22 December 1928. It was redesignated for the 79th Artillery Regiment on 14 April 1958. The insignia was redesignated effective 1 September 1971, for the 79th Field Artillery Regiment.

=== Coat of arms ===
Blazon

Shield: Or, a bend Gules, on a sinister canton of the like a sun in splendor of the field charged with the numeral “13” Sable (for the 13th Cavalry), in base the insignia of the regiment Proper (a Red hour-glass on a Black circle surrounded by a Green band).

Crest: On a wreath of the colors Or and Gules, a horse's head armored Proper.

Motto: "Our Country – Our Regiment."

Symbolism

Shield: The 21st Cavalry was organized in June 1917 from the 13th Cavalry, and converted into Field Artillery as the 79th, in November of the same year. Its original Cavalry character is shown by the color of the field, its Field Artillery service by the red bend. The canton shows a device from the badge of the 13th Cavalry, the parent organization. The regiment insignia in base is the shoulder sleeve insignia of the 7th Division with colors reversed, surrounded by a green band.

Crest: The armored horse's head represents Cavalry and Armor, respectively.

Background: The coat of arms was originally approved for the 79th Field Artillery Regiment on 1 September 1920. It was redesignated for the 79th Artillery Regiment on 14 April 1958. The insignia was redesignated effective 1 September 1971, for the 79th Field Artillery Regiment

== Current configuration ==
- 1st Battalion 79th Field Artillery Regiment (United States)
- 2nd Battalion 79th Field Artillery Regiment (United States)
- 3rd Battalion 79th Field Artillery Regiment (United States)
- 4th Battalion 79th Field Artillery Regiment (United States)
- 5th Battalion 79th Field Artillery Regiment (United States)
- 6th Battalion 79th Field Artillery Regiment (United States)

== Campaign participation credit ==
- World War I: Streamer without inscription
- World War II: Naples-Foggia; Rome-Arno; North Apennines; Normandy; Northern France; Rhineland; Ardennes-Alsace; Central Europe
- Korean War: UN Defensive; UN Offensive; CCF Intervention; First UN Counteroffensive; CCF Spring Offensive; UN Summer-Fall Offensive; Second Korean Winter; Korea, Summer-Fall 1952; Third Korean Winter; Korea, Summer 1953
- Vietnam: Counteroffensive, Phase VII; Consolidation I; Consolidation II; Cease-Fire

== Decorations ==
- Presidential Unit Citation (Army) for LONG BINH

== See also ==
- Field Artillery Branch (United States)
- U.S. Army Coast Artillery Corps
