= 31st Field Artillery Regiment =

US military unit

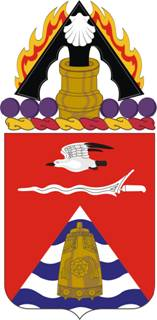
- Coat of arms
- Active: 1918
- Country: United States
- Branch: Army
- Type: Field artillery
- Mottos: In Periculo, Nos Jubete (When in Danger, Command Us)

Insignia
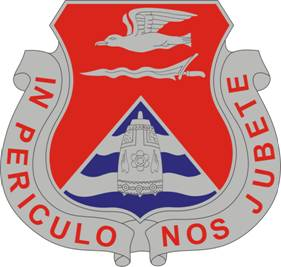
- Distinctive unit insignia

The 31st Field Artillery Regiment is a field artillery regiment of the United States Army, first constituted in 1918 in the National Army (USA). The 1st Battalion, 31st Field Artillery, was constituted 5 July 1918 in the National Army as the 31st Field Artillery and assigned to the 11th Division. The "Proud American" Battalion was organized at Camp George G. Meade, Maryland 6 August 1918 but relieved thereafter from its assignment to the 11th Division on 30 September 1918. The unit demobilized 9 December 1918 at Camp George G. Meade, Maryland.

== History ==
On 22 July 1929, 31st FA was reconstituted in the Regular Army and assigned to the 2nd Division but was, once again, later relieved on 1 January 1930 from its assignment to the 2nd Division.

The "Proud American" Battalion was subsequently assigned to the 7th Division on 1 July 1940 and activated at Camp Ord, California where it was reorganized and re-designated as the 31st Field Artillery Battalion on 1 October 1940. It underwent another reorganization and re-designation on 1 July 1957 as the 31st Field Artillery, "Always First," which was a parent regiment under the Combat Arms Regimental System.

31st FA was then withdrawn from the Combat Arms Regimental System 16 March 1989, reorganized under the United States Army Regimental System, and transferred to the United States Army Training and Doctrine Command (TRADOC).

The unit was re-designated as the 31st Field Artillery Regiment on 1 October 2005 and began the reactivation process on 1 October 2010, attaining operational capacity under the 434th Field Artillery Brigade and activated on 11 January 2011.

The "Proud American" Battalion is credited with participating in multiple campaigns in World War II and the Korean War. It has been distinguished with several decorations, to include the Philippine Presidential Unit Citation and the Republic of Korea Presidential Unit Citation that was awarded on three separate occasions.

== Lineage ==
Constituted in the National Army as the 31st Field Artillery and assigned to the 11th Infantry Division (United States) 5 July 1918.

== Distinctive unit insignia ==
- Description

A Silver color metal and enamel device 1 5/32 inches (2.9 cm) in height overall consisting of a shield blazoned: Gules, beneath a kittiwake Volant a kris fesswise Argent, in base a pile reversed barry wavy Azure and of the second thereon a bell Silver. Attached below and to the sides of the shield a Silver scroll inscribed “IN PERICULO NOS JUBETE” in Red letters.

- Symbolism

Scarlet is the color used for Field Artillery. The kittiwake, a gull associated with the Aleutians, and the kris, representative of the Pacific Islands, are symbolic of service during World War II. The bell connotes service in Korea. The blue and white wavy bars are indicative of the organization's amphibious operations.

- Background

The distinctive unit insignia was originally approved for the 31st Field Artillery Battalion on 29 December 1951. It was amended to rescind the motto “IN PERICULO, NOBIS MITTETE” (When in Danger, Send for Us) and add the motto “IN PERICULO, NOS JUBETE” (When in Danger, Command Us) on 4 May 1953. The insignia was redesignated for the 31st Artillery Regiment on 13 March 1958. It was amended to remove the punctuation from the motto on 28 July 1958. The insignia was redesignated for the 31st Field Artillery Regiment on 1 September 1971. It was amended to update the description on 1 August 2006.

== Coat of arms ==
- Blazon
- Shield

Gules, beneath a kittiwake Volant Proper a kris fesswise Argent, in base a pile reversed barry wavy of the second and Azure, thereon a Bronze bell also Proper.

- Crest

On a wreath of the colors Or and Gules, between six golpes in fess a Bronze howitzer bore upward issuing a pheon reversed Sable inflamed Proper and charged with an escallop Argent.

- Motto

IN PERICULO NOS JUBETE (When in Danger, Command Us).

- Symbolism
- Shield

Scarlet is the color used for Field Artillery. The kittiwake, a gull associated with the Aleutians, and the kris, representative of the Pacific Islands, are symbolic of service during World War II. The bronze bell connotes service in Korea. The blue and white wavy bars are indicative of the organization's amphibious operations.

- Crest

The howitzer symbolizes Field Artillery. The inflamed pheon, alluding to the quadrant, an instrument for measuring altitude, refers to the hills of Korea and the intensive devastating and accurate fire laid down during March 1953. The six grapeshots symbolize the six more famous engagements in which the organization participated during the Korean War. The escallop or seashell refers to the Pacific area and the organization's service in World War II.

- Background

The coat of arms was originally approved for the 31st Field Artillery Battalion on 29 December 1951. It was amended to rescind the motto “IN PERICULO, NOBIS MITTETE” (When in Danger, Send for Us) and add the motto “IN PERICULO, NOS JUBETE” (When in Danger, Command Us) on 4 May 1953. The insignia was redesignated for the 31st Artillery Regiment on 13 March 1958. It was amended to remove the punctuation from the motto on 28 July 1958. It was amended to add a crest on 24 November 1964. The insignia was redesignated for the 31st Field Artillery Regiment on 1 September 1971. It was amended to correct the blazon of the shield and crest on 1 August 2006.

== Current configuration ==
- 1st Battalion 31st Field Artillery Regiment (United States)
- 2nd Battalion 31st Field Artillery Regiment (United States)
- 3rd Battalion 31st Field Artillery Regiment (United States)
- 4th Battalion 31st Field Artillery Regiment (United States)
- 5th Battalion 31st Field Artillery Regiment (United States)
- 6th Battalion 31st Field Artillery Regiment (United States)

== See also ==
- Field Artillery Branch (United States)
