= 2nd Battalion =

2nd Battalion may refer to:

== Australia ==
- 2nd Battalion (Australia)
- 2nd Battalion, Royal Australian Regiment
- 2nd Cyclist Battalion
- 2nd Force Support Battalion
- 2nd Health Battalion
- 2nd Machine Gun Battalion
- 2nd New Guinea Infantry Battalion
- 2nd Pioneer Battalion (Australia)
- 2/2nd Battalion (Australia)
- 2/2nd Machine Gun Battalion
- 2/2nd Pioneer Battalion

== Canada ==
- 2nd Battalion (Eastern Ontario Regiment), CEF
- 2nd Battalion, Canadian Mounted Rifles
- 2nd Battalion, Canadian Railway Troops
- 2nd Canadian Highland Battalion
- 2nd Canadian Parachute Battalion
- 2nd Canadian Rifle Battalion
- 2nd Reserve Battalion (Central Ontario), CEF

== Germany ==
- 2nd Lithuanian Construction Battalion
- 2nd Lithuanian Fusilier Reserve Battalion

== (British) India ==
- 2nd Battalion, 5th (Travancore) Regiment of Bombay Native Infantry
- 2nd Battalion, 6th Regiment of Bombay Native Infantry
- 2nd Battalion, 7th Madras Native Infantry
- 2nd Battalion, 16th Bengal Native Infantry
- 2nd Battalion, 21st Bengal Native Infantry
- 2nd Battalion, Bombay Sepoys
- 2nd Battalion, Maratha Light Infantry Regiment
- 2nd Extra Battalion of Bombay Native Infantry
- 2nd Extra Battalion, Bengal Native Infantry
- 2nd Madras Battalion

== Italy ==
- 2nd Paratroopers Battalion "Tarquinia"
- 2nd Sappers Battalion "Iseo"
- 3rd Tank Battalion "M.O. Galas"

== Ukraine ==
- 2nd Battalion International Legion
- 2nd Independent Motorized Infantry Battalion

== United Kingdom ==
- 2nd Battalion, 1st Regiment of Foot
- 2nd Battalion, Black Watch
- 2nd Battalion, The Duke of Lancaster's Regiment
- 2nd Battalion, East Riding Local Militia
- 2nd Battalion, Grenadier Guards
- 2nd Battalion, Mercian Volunteers
- 2nd Battalion, Monmouthshire Regiment
- 2nd Battalion, Parachute Regiment
- 2nd Battalion, Princess of Wales's Royal Regiment
- 2nd Battalion, The Rifles
- 2nd Battalion, The Royal Anglian Regiment 'The Poachers'
- 2nd Battalion, Royal Gurkha Rifles
- 2nd Battalion, Royal Regiment of Scotland
- 2nd Battalion, The Royal Welsh (Royal Regiment of Wales)
- 2nd Battalion, Tower Hamlets Rifles
- 2nd Battalion, Ulster Defence Regiment
- 2nd Battalion, Wessex Volunteers
- 2nd Battalion, York and Lancaster Regiment
- 2nd Battalion, Yorkshire Regiment
- 2nd (City of London) Battalion, London Regiment (Royal Fusiliers)
- 2nd (Wyeside) Battalion, Loyal Brecknock Volunteers
- 2nd Administrative Battalion, Cinque Ports Rifle Volunteer Corps
- 2nd Administrative Battalion, Derbyshire Rifle Volunteer Corps
- 2nd Administrative Battalion, East York Rifle Volunteers
- 2nd Administrative Battalion, Lanarkshire Rifle Volunteer Corps
- 2nd Administrative Battalion, Lancashire Rifle Volunteers
- 2nd Administrative Battalion, Perthshire Rifle Volunteers
- 2nd Administrative Battalion, Sussex Rifle Volunteer Corps
- 2nd Anti-Aircraft Battalion, Royal Engineers
- 2nd Baluch Battalion
- 2nd Field Battalion, Royal Engineers
- 2nd Football Battalion
- 2nd (Home Service) Garrison Battalion, Dorset Regiment
- 2nd (Home Service) Garrison Battalion, Suffolk Regiment
- 2nd (Prince of Wales's) Volunteer Battalion
- 2nd Volunteer Battalion, Gloucestershire Regiment
- 2nd Volunteer Battalion, King's (Liverpool Regiment)
- 2nd Volunteer Battalion, Loyal North Lancashire Regiment
- 2nd Volunteer Battalion, Manchester Regiment
- 2nd Volunteer Battalion, Royal Gloucestershire, Berkshire and Wiltshire Regiment
- 2nd Volunteer Battalion, Royal Welch Fusiliers
- 2nd Volunteer Battalion, Sherwood Foresters
- 2nd Volunteer Battalion, West Yorkshire Regiment
- 2nd Volunteer Battalion, York & Lancaster Regiment

== United States ==
=== Confederate States Army ===
- 2nd Battalion, Arkansas State Troops
- 2nd Cavalry Battalion (Mississippi Reserves)
- 2nd Maryland Cavalry Battalion
- 2nd Mississippi and Alabama Battalion

=== Union Army ===
- 2nd District of Columbia Infantry Battalion
- 2nd Battalion Massachusetts Cavalry

=== United States Army ===
- 2nd Battalion, 1st Air Defense Artillery Regiment
- 2nd Battalion, 44th Air Defense Artillery Regiment
- 2nd Battalion, 52nd Air Defense Artillery Regiment
- 2nd Battalion, 37th Armored Regiment
- 2nd Battalion, 13th Aviation Regiment
- 2nd Battalion, 25th Aviation Regiment
- 2nd Battalion, 130th Aviation Regiment
- 2nd Battalion, 135th Aviation Regiment
- 2nd Battalion, 149th Aviation Regiment
- 2nd Battalion, 151st Aviation Regiment
- 2nd Battalion, 159th Aviation Regiment
- 2nd Battalion, 211th Aviation Regiment
- 2nd Battalion, 227th Aviation Regiment
- 2nd Battalion, 229th Aviation Regiment
- 2nd Battalion, 238th Aviation Regiment
- 2nd Battalion, 244th Aviation Regiment
- 2nd Battalion, 285th Aviation Regiment
- 2nd Battalion, 641st Aviation Regiment
- 2nd Battalion, 34th Brigade Combat Team
- 2nd Battalion, 5th Cavalry Regiment
- 2nd Battalion, 2nd Field Artillery Regiment
- 2nd Battalion, 3rd Field Artillery Regiment
- 2nd Battalion, 5th Field Artillery Regiment
- 2nd Battalion, 8th Field Artillery Regiment
- 2nd Battalion, 9th Field Artillery Regiment
- 2nd Battalion, 11th Field Artillery Regiment
- 2nd Battalion, 18th Field Artillery Regiment
- 2nd Battalion, 20th Field Artillery Regiment
- 2nd Battalion, 27th Field Artillery Regiment
- 2nd Battalion, 29th Field Artillery Regiment
- 2nd Battalion, 32nd Field Artillery Regiment
- 2nd Battalion, 80th Field Artillery Regiment
- 2nd Battalion, 319th Field Artillery Regiment
- 2nd Battalion, 320th Field Artillery Regiment
- 2nd Battalion, 321st Field Artillery Regiment
- 2nd Battalion, 377th Field Artillery Regiment
- 2nd Battalion, 1st Infantry Regiment
- 2nd Battalion, 2nd Infantry Regiment
- 2nd Battalion, 4th Infantry Regiment
- 2nd Battalion, 8th Infantry Regiment
- 2nd Battalion, 10th Infantry Regiment
- 2nd Battalion, 12th Infantry Regiment
- 2nd Battalion, 14th Infantry Regiment
- 2nd Battalion, 30th Infantry Regiment
- 2nd Battalion, 35th Infantry Regiment
- 2nd Battalion, 87th Infantry Regiment
- 2nd Battalion, 121st Infantry Regiment
- 2nd Battalion, 124th Infantry Regiment
- 2nd Battalion, 134th Infantry Regiment
- 2nd Battalion, 153rd Infantry Regiment
- 2nd Battalion, 325th Infantry Regiment
- 2nd Battalion, 503rd Infantry Regiment
- 2nd Battalion, 505th Infantry Regiment
- 2nd Battalion, 20th Special Forces Group
- 2nd Missile Battalion, 79th Artillery
- 2nd Brigade Special Troops Battalion
- 2nd Chemical Battalion
- 2nd Engineer Battalion
- 2nd Military Intelligence Battalion
- 2nd Ranger Battalion

=== United States Marine Corps ===
- 2nd Battalion, 1st Marines
- 2nd Battalion, 2nd Marines
- 2nd Battalion, 3rd Marines
- 2nd Battalion, 4th Marines
- 2nd Battalion, 5th Marines
- 2nd Battalion, 6th Marines
- 2nd Battalion, 7th Marines
- 2nd Battalion, 8th Marines
- 2nd Battalion, 9th Marines
- 2nd Battalion, 10th Marines
- 2nd Battalion, 11th Marines
- 2nd Battalion, 14th Marines
- 2nd Battalion, 15th Marines
- 2nd Battalion, 19th Marines
- 2nd Battalion, 23rd Marines
- 2nd Battalion, 24th Marines
- 2nd Battalion, 25th Marines
- 2nd Battalion, 26th Marines
- 2nd Battalion, 28th Marines
- 2nd 90mm Antiaircraft Artillery Gun Battalion
- 2nd Airdrome Battalion
- 2nd Antiaircraft Artillery Battalion
- 2nd Antiaircraft Artillery Battalion (Composite)
- 2nd Assault Amphibian Battalion
- 2nd Combat Engineer Battalion
- 2nd Dental Battalion
- 2nd Intelligence Battalion
- 2nd Landing Support Battalion
- 2nd Law Enforcement Battalion
- 2nd Light Antiaircraft Missile Battalion
- 2nd Light Armored Reconnaissance Battalion
- 2nd Low Altitude Air Defense Battalion
- 2nd Maintenance Battalion
- 2nd Marine Raider Battalion
- 2nd Medical Battalion
- 2nd Radio Battalion
- 2nd Reconnaissance Battalion
- 2nd Recruit Training Battalion
- 2nd Tank Battalion
- 2nd Transportation Support Battalion

=== Other units ===
- 2nd Battalion, Mississippi Rifles, Mexican–American War
- Second Battalion Naval Militia, a former armory in New York City

== Other countries ==
- 2nd Commando Battalion (Bangladesh)
- 2nd Commando Battalion (Belgium)
- 2nd Combat Engineer Battalion (Colombia)
- 2nd Armoured-Mechanized Battalion, Croatia
- 2nd Single Infantry Battalion, Estonia
- 2nd Foreign Parachute Battalion, France
- 2nd Grodno Battalion of the King and Commonwealth, Lithuania
- 2nd Māori Battalion, New Zealand
- 2nd Battalion (Norway)
- 2nd Noveleta Battalion, Philippines
- 2nd Parachute Battalion (South Africa)

== See also ==
- 2nd Army (disambiguation)
- II Corps (disambiguation)
- 2nd Division (disambiguation)
- 2nd Brigade (disambiguation)
- 2nd Regiment (disambiguation)
- 2nd Squadron (disambiguation)
- 2nd (disambiguation)
