= 2nd Arkansas Cavalry Regiment =

2nd Arkansas Cavalry Regiment may refer to:

- 2nd Arkansas Cavalry Regiment (Morgan's), a Confederate unit
- 2nd Arkansas Cavalry Regiment (Slemons'), a Confederate unit
- 2nd Arkansas Cavalry Regiment (Union), a Union unit
- 2nd Arkansas Mounted Rifles, a Confederate unit

== See also ==
- 2nd Battalion, Arkansas State Troops, a Confederate cavalry unit
