= 428th Field Artillery Brigade =

- 428th Field Artillery Brigade Shoulder Sleeve Insignia
- Active: 1944 - 1950; 2006 - present
- Country: United States
- Branch: United States Army
- Role: US Army Field Artillery Training
- Size: Brigade
- Part of: United States Army Field Artillery School
- Garrison/HQ: Fort Sill (OK)
- Mottos: First and Always

Commanders
- Brigade Commander: COL Lazander C. Tomlinson
- Brigade Command Sergeant Major: CSM Nathan D. Buchko

Insignia
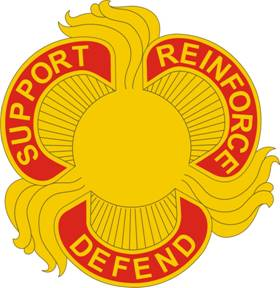
- 428th Field Artillery Brigade DUI

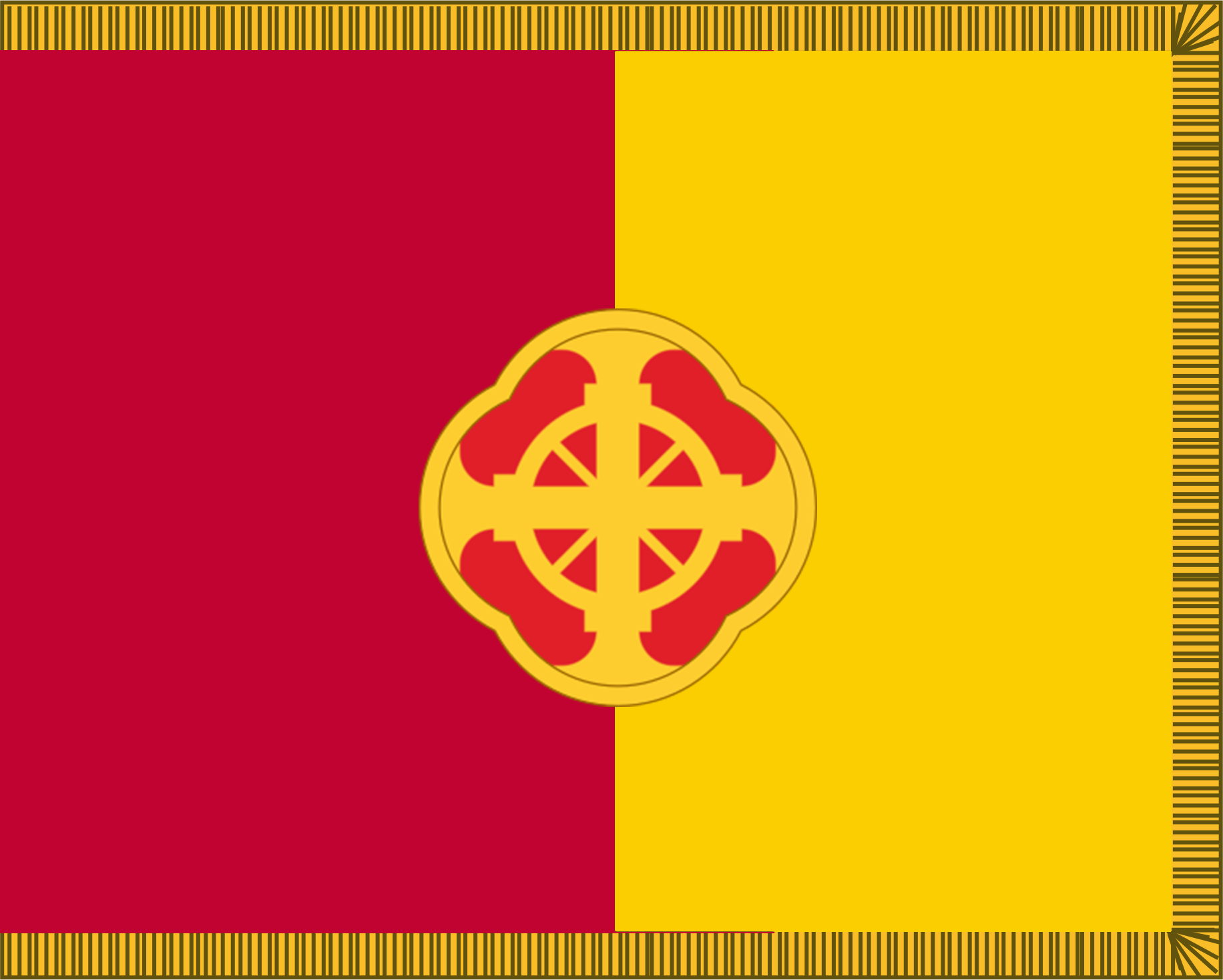
- 428th Field Artillery Brigade Flag

The 428th Field Artillery Brigade is a training unit under the United States Field Artillery School, a formation under the United States Army Transformation and Training Command. The brigade trains all officers and enlisted personnel from the U.S. Army and U.S. Marine Corps as well as allied nation military personnel in field artillery core competencies in order to provide proficient integrators of lethal and non-lethal fires to the operational force.

== History ==
The unit was constituted 19 July 1944 in the Army of the United States as Headquarters and Headquarters Battery, 428th Field Artillery Group. It was later activated 25 August 1944 at Fort Leonard Wood, Missouri. It was inactivated for a period on 30 September 1945 in Italy. It was later allotted 29 October 1946 to the Organized Reserves. The unit was inactivated again on 4 December 1950 at Gary, Indiana. The unit went through several more re-designations and inactivations before finally being transferred 18 August 2006 to the United States Army Training and Doctrine Command and activated 7 December 2006 at Fort Sill, Oklahoma.

in February 1989 the 1st Battalion, 78th Field Artillery was reactivated and transferred to Fort Sill, where it continued in the conduct of Initial Entry Training.

== Lineage and honors ==
=== Lineage ===
- Constituted 19 July 1944 in the Army of the United States as Headquarters and Headquarters Battery, 428th Field Artillery Group
- Activated 25 August 1944 at Fort Leonard Wood, Missouri
- Inactivated 30 September 1945 in Italy
- Allotted 29 October 1946 to the Organized Reserves
- Activated 14 November 1946 at Lafayette, Indiana

(Organized Reserves redesignated 25 March 1948 as the Organized Reserve Corps; redesignated 9 July 1952 as the Army Reserve)

- Location changed 22 August 1949 to Gary, Indiana
- Inactivated 4 December 1950 at Gary, Indiana
- Redesignated 24 November 1967 as Headquarters and Headquarters Battery, 428th Artillery Group
- Activated 31 January 1968 at South Bend, Indiana
- Redesignated 1 September 1971 as Headquarters and Headquarters Battery, 428th Field Artillery Group
- Redesignated 1 June 1978 as Headquarters and Headquarters Battery, 428th Field Artillery Brigade
- Inactivated 15 September 1996 at South Bend, Indiana
- Transferred 18 August 2006 to the United States Army Training and Doctrine Command
- Headquarters activated 7 December 2006 at Fort Sill, Oklahoma

=== Campaign participation credit ===
- World War II: Rome-Arno; North Apennines; Po Valley

== Organization ==
The 428th Field Artillery Brigade consists of three battalions:

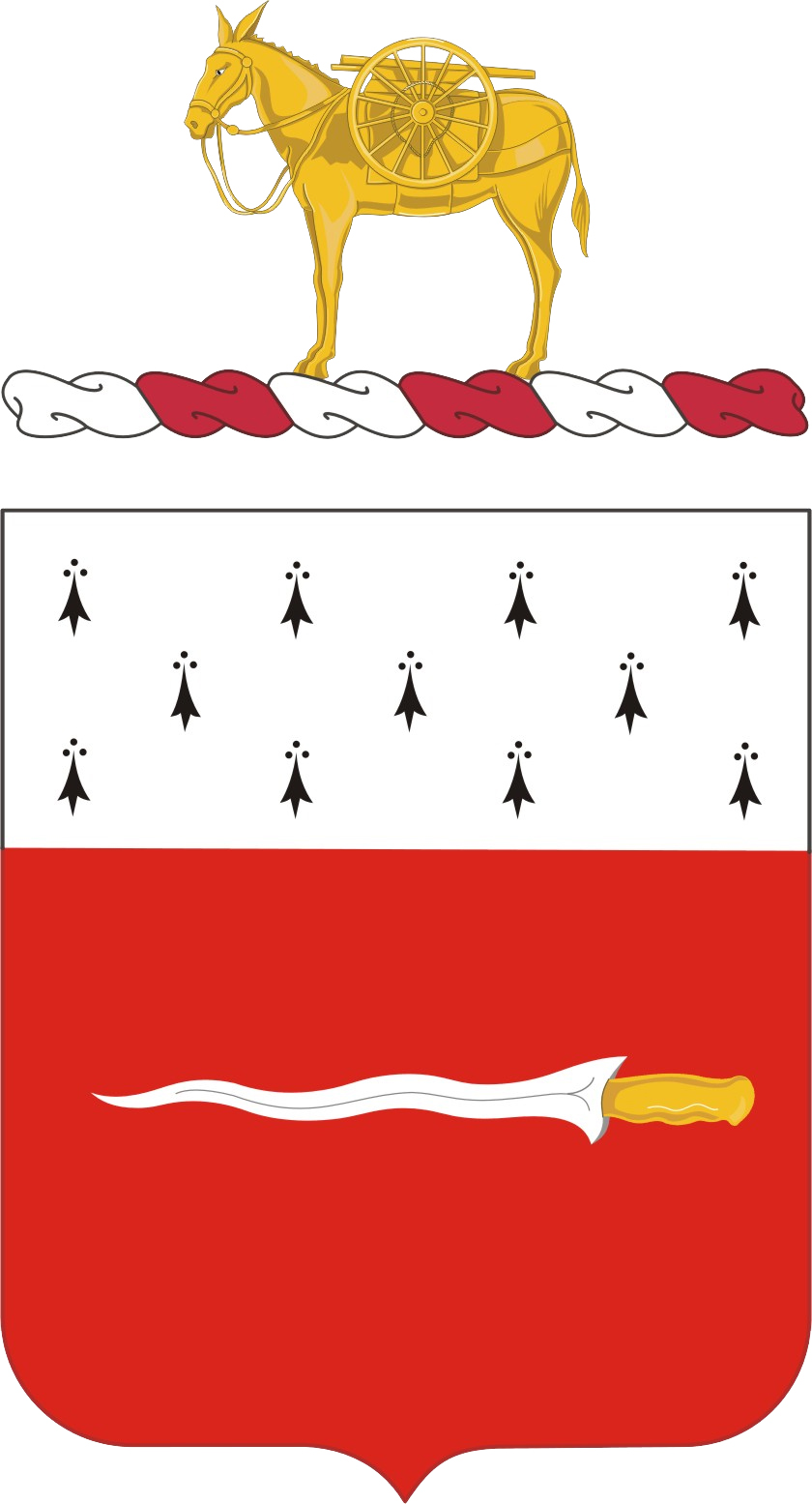
- 2nd Battalion, 2nd Field Artillery Regiment (2-2nd FAR) (Direct Support Field Artillery Battalion)
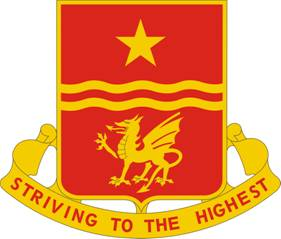
- 1st Battalion, 30th Field Artillery Regiment (1-30th FAR) (BOLC B, Captains Career Course)
- 1st Battalion, 78th Field Artillery Regiment (Advanced Individual Training)
