= 2nd Field Artillery Regiment (United States) =

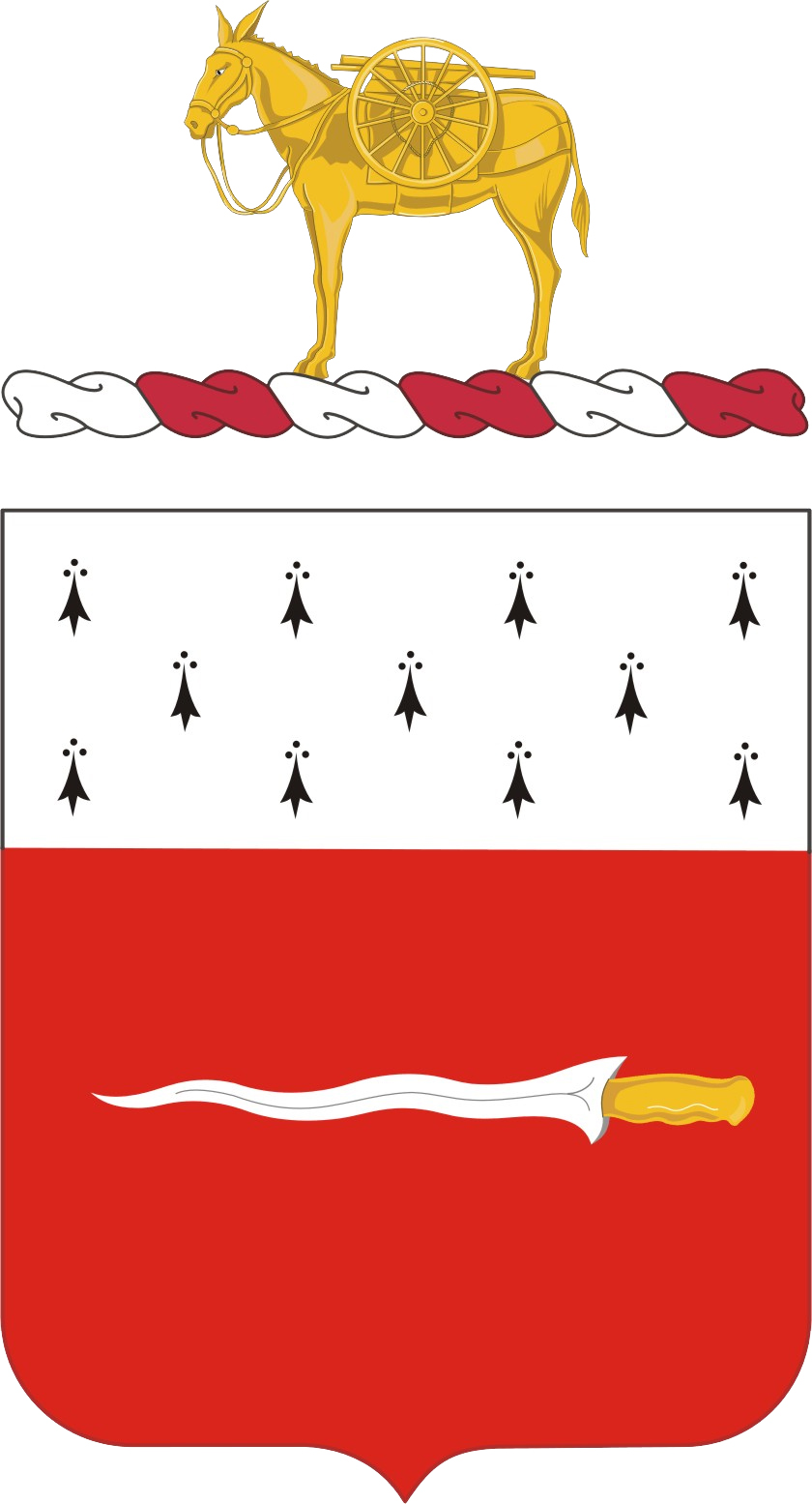
- Coat of arms
- Active: 1907–present
- Country: (United States)
- Branch: United States Army
- Type: Field artillery
- Role: USARS parent regiment
- Size: regiment
- Motto: The Second First

Insignia
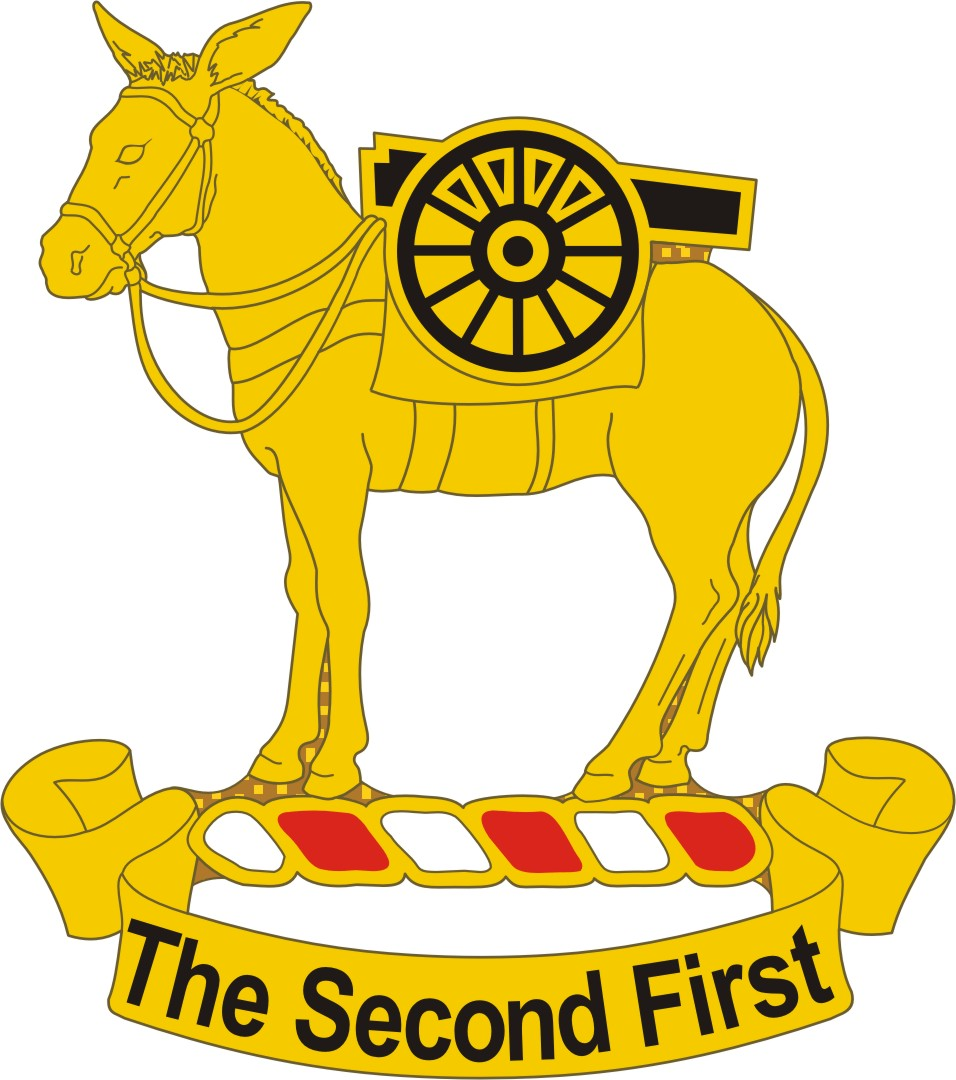
- Distinctive unit insignia

The 2nd Field Artillery Regiment is a field artillery regiment in the United States Army. Currently a parent regiment under the U.S. Army Regimental System, the regiment has a single active battalion, the 2nd Battalion, 2nd Field Artillery, assigned to the 428th Field Artillery Brigade at the U.S. Army Field Artillery, Fort Sill, Oklahoma.

== Current status of regimental elements ==
- 1st Battalion, 2nd Field Artillery: inactive since 1984 Last assignment DIVARTY 8th infantry Division Baumholder, Rhineland-Palatinate, Germany.
- 2nd Battalion, 2nd Field Artillery: active, assigned to the 428th Field Artillery Brigade at Fort Sill, Oklahoma
- 4th Battalion, 2nd Field Artillery: inactive since 1963
- 5th Battalion, 2nd Field Artillery: inactive since 1971
- 7th Battalion, 2nd Field Artillery: inactive since 1971

== Lineage and honors ==
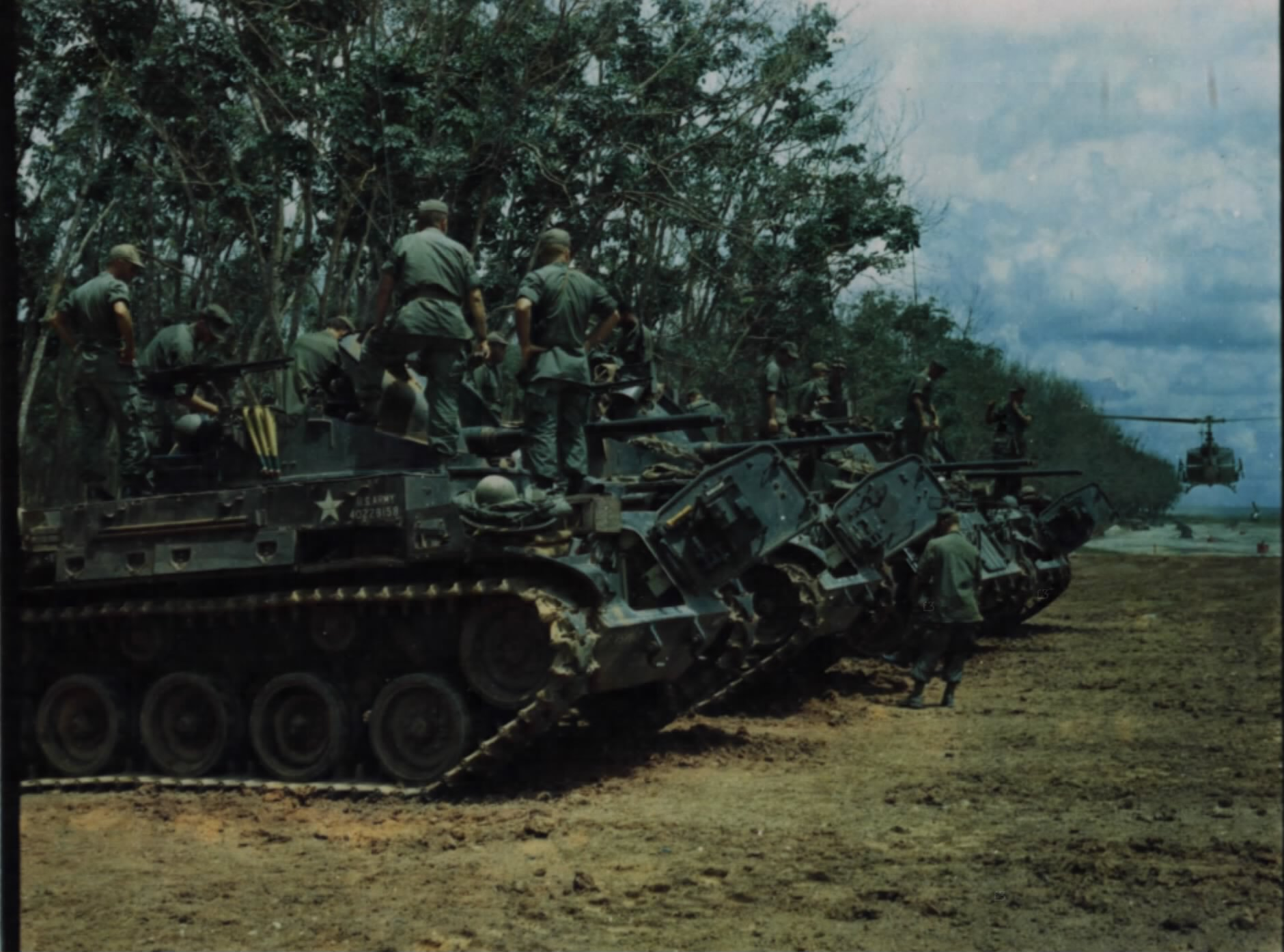
Members of Battery "A", 5th Battalion, 2nd Artillery, check their M42 Dusters at Camp Radcliff, 1967

=== Lineage ===
- Constituted 25 January 1907 in the Regular Army as the 2d Field Artillery
- Organised 6 June 1907 from new and existing units with headquarters at Fort D.A. Russell, Wyoming
- Assigned 31 January 1918 to the 8th Division
- Relieved 5 September 1919 from assignment to the 8th Division
- Inactivated 2 February 1922 at Camp Bragg, North Carolina
- Assigned 1 August 1922 to the 4th Division and activated (less 2d Battalion) at Camp Bragg, North Carolina (2d Battalion concurrently activated at Camp George G. Meade, Maryland)
- 2d Battalion inactivated 14 December 1922 at Fort Myer, Virginia)
- Relieved 5 September 1927 from assignment to the 4th Division (1st Battalion concurrently inactivated at Fort Bragg, North Carolina)
- Assigned 17 March 1930 to the Panama Canal Division
- (1st Battalion activated 30 April 1930 at Fort Davis, Panama, Canal Zone; concurrently, consolidated with the 2d Field Artillery Battalion [active] [constituted 1 September 1927 in the Regular Army and activated at Fort Davis, Canal Zone], and consolidated unit designated as the 1st Battalion, 2d Field Artillery)
- Relieved 15 April 1932 from assignment to the Panama Canal Division
- Reorganised and redesignated 13 January 1941 as the 2d Field Artillery Battalion
- Inactivated 29 March 1946 at Camp Kilmer, New Jersey
- Activated 1 August 1946 at Fort Sill, Oklahoma
- Redesignated 20 January 1948 as the 2d Rocket Field Artillery Battalion
- Redesignated 31 July 1949 as the 2d Field Artillery Battalion
- Inactivated 25 June 1958 at Fort Sill, Oklahoma
- Consolidated 15 December 1961 with Headquarters and Headquarters Battery, 2d Artillery Group, and the 2d, 12th, and 42d Antiaircraft Artillery Battalions (all organized in 1821 as the 2d Regiment of Artillery) to form the 2d Artillery, a parent regiment under the Combat Arms Regimental System
- 2d Artillery (less former Headquarters and Headquarters Battery, 2d Artillery Group and the 2d, 12th, and 42d Antiaircraft Artillery Battalions) reorganized and redesignated 1 September 1971 as the 2d Field Artillery, a parent regiment under the Combat Arms Regimental System (former elements concurrently reorganized and redesignated as the 2d Air Defense Artillery – hereafter separate lineage)
- 2d Field Artillery withdrawn 16 January 1986 from the Combat Arms Regimental System and reorganized under the United States Army Regimental System
- Transferred 2 October 1991 to the United States Army Training and Doctrine Command
- Redesignated 1 October 2005 as the 2d Field Artillery Regiment

=== Campaign participation credit ===
- Philippine Insurrection: Jolo 1903
- World War I: Streamer without inscription
- World War II: Northern France, Rhineland, Central Europe
- Vietnam: Counteroffensive, Phase II; Counteroffensive, Phase III; Tet Counteroffensive; Counteroffensive, Phase IV; Counteroffensive, Phase V; Counteroffensive, Phase VI; Tet 69/ Counteroffensive; Summer-Fall 1969; Winter-Spring 1970; Sanctuary Counteroffensive; Counteroffensive, Phase VII

=== Decorations ===
- Meritorious Unit Commendation (Army) for VIETNAM 1967 –1968

== Heraldry ==
=== Coat of arms ===
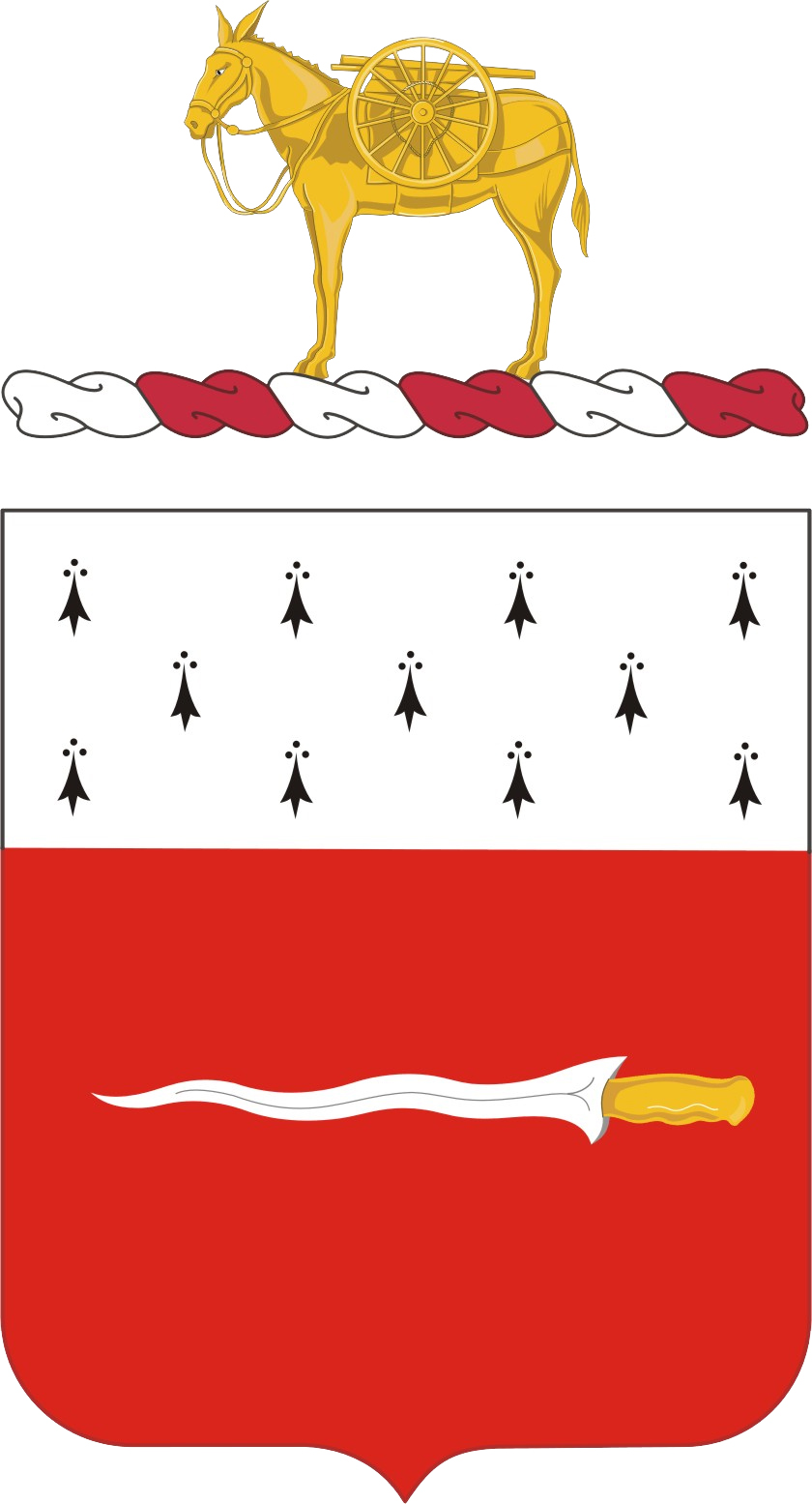

- Description/Blazon:
  Shield:Gules, in fess a Kris Argent hilted Or, a chief ermine.
  Crest: On a wreath of the colors Argent and Gules, a mule pack Or.
  Motto: The Second First.
- Symbolism:
  Shield: The shield is scarlet for Artillery. The Kris commemorates service against the Moros during the Philippine Insurrection, while the ermine is from the arms of Brittany where the regiment served in France during World War I.
  Crest: The crest shows its original character as mountain or pack artillery.
- Background: The coat of arms was originally approved for the 2d Field Artillery Regiment on 31 May 1921. It was redesignated for the 2d Field Artillery Battalion on 22 October 1946. It was redesignated for the 2d Rocket Field Artillery Battalion on 10 February 1948. It was redesignated for the 2d Field Artillery Battalion on 29 July 1957. It was rescinded on 14 July 1959. The insignia was restored and authorized for the 2d Field Artillery Regiment on 1 September 1971. It was amended to revise the symbolism on 17 April 1978.

== Distinctive unit insignia ==
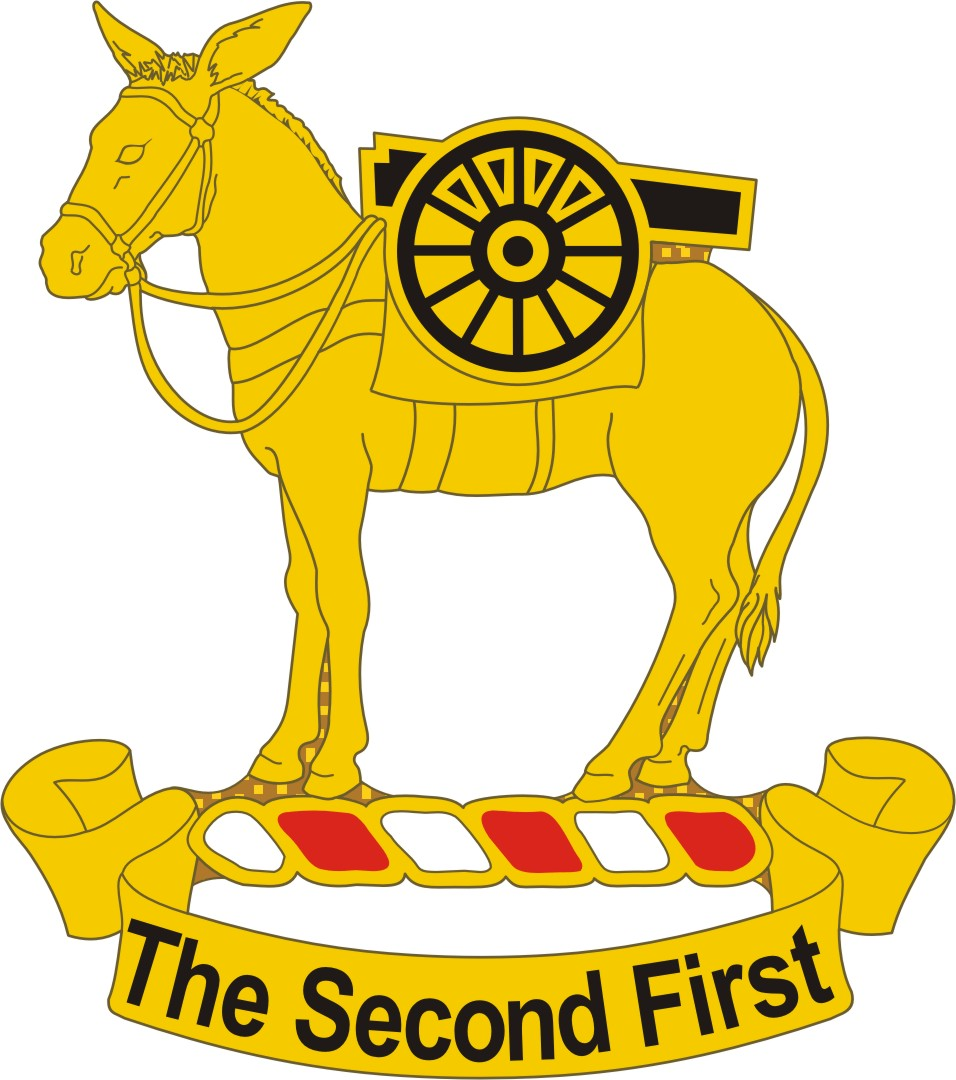

- Description/Blazon: A gold color metal and enamel device 1 3/16 inches (3.02 cm) in height consisting of a wreath of alternating white and red supporting a gold mule with a black field piece on its back, all above a gold arced scroll inscribed "THE SECOND FIRST" in black letters. This insignia is to be worn in pairs.
- Symbolism: The insignia is an adaptation of the crest and motto of the coat of arms and alludes to the original character of the organization as mountain or pack artillery.
- Background: The distinctive unit insignia was originally approved for the 2d Field Artillery Regiment on 28 April 1923. It was redesignated for the 2d Rocket Field Artillery Battalion on 10 February 1948. It was redesignated for the 2d Field Artillery Battalion on 29 July 1957. It was rescinded on 14 July 1959. The insignia was restored and authorized for the 2d Field Artillery Regiment on 1 September 1971. It was amended to revise the symbolism and correct the description on 17 April 1978.

== See also ==
- 428th Field Artillery Brigade
- United States Army Field Artillery School
- Field Artillery Branch (United States)
