= Big Deuce VII =

Mascot of the US Army's 2nd Battalion, 2nd Field Artillery Regiment

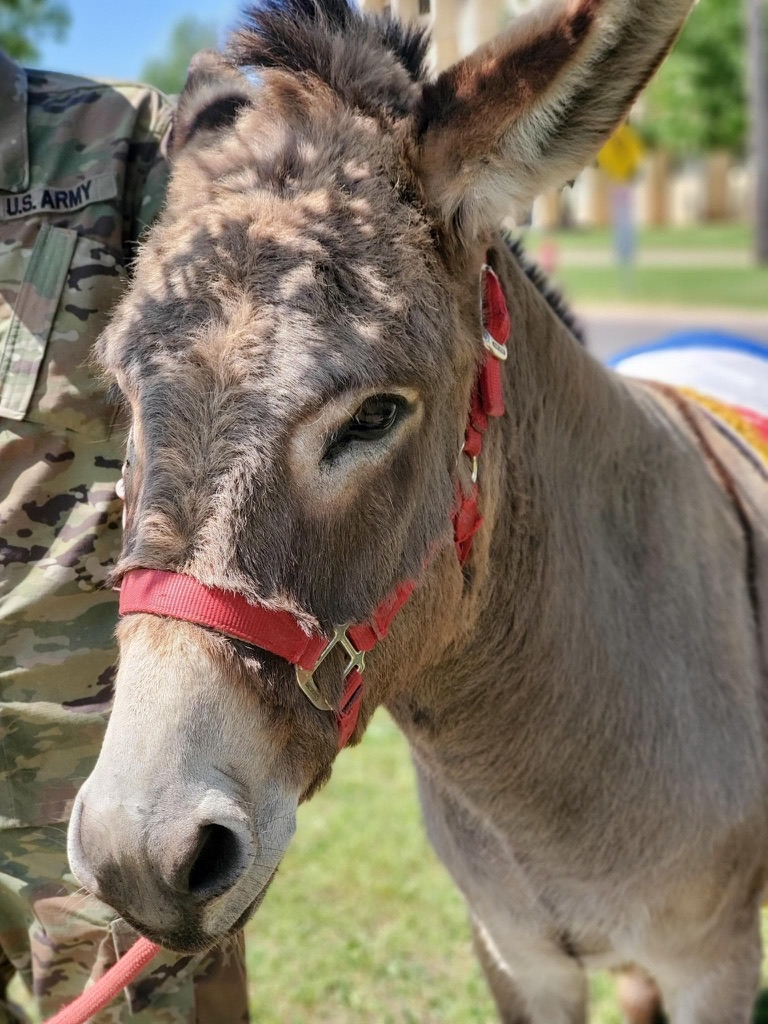
Big Deuce VII pictured in 2020

Big Deuce VII (born 2015) is a donkey used as a mascot of the United States Army's 2nd Battalion, 2nd Field Artillery Regiment.

The battalion first acquired a donkey as mascot in the 1950s, which was imported from Mexico. Big Deuce VII was assigned as unit mascot in August 2015, at age four months. He succeeded Big Deuce VI who had served as mascot since about 1995. According to the U.S. Army, Big Deuce VII is ill-mannered and has a tendency to bite humans.

In addition to Big Deuce VII the battalion has a second mascot, a goat named Short Round. 2nd Battalion, 2nd Field Artillery Regiment is one of two units in the U.S. Army to be authorized a live animal mascot, the other being the United States Corps of Cadets.

== See also ==
- Chesty XV
