= Francisco Javier Vergara y Velasco =

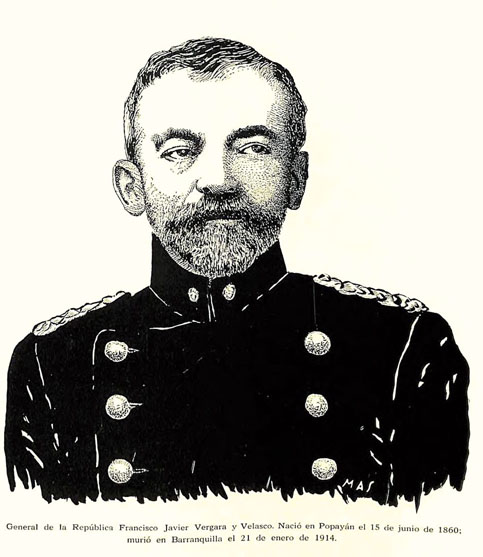
- Born: 1860; Popayan Colombia
- Died: 1914 (aged 53–54); Barranquilla Colombia
- Occupations: Military, geographer, Historian
- Title: General
- Family: Vergara family
- Awards: Charles Manoir of la Société de Géographie
- Honours: Battalion of Engineers "Vergara y Velasco" in the Colombian Army

Francisco Javier Vergara y Velasco (1860 in Popayán – 1914 in Barranquilla) was a Colombian geographer, cartographer and historian.

== Life and work ==
His major works are the Nueva Geografía de Colombia (1888, 1892 and 1901; final version published in 1902) and the Atlas completo de geografía colombiana (1906–1910), through which he won the Charles Manoir price of the Paris Geographical Society.

Vergara was an erudite and critical writer, and his geographical thoughts did not fit within the parameters of the dominant geographical ideologies in the country of his time; his work serves as a starting point for studies of the history of territorial formation in Colombia.

The anarchist French geographer Elisée Reclus based his chapter on Colombia in his Nouvelle Géographie Universelle on the works of Vergara y Velasco.

The Colombian National Army's 2nd Combat Engineer Battalion, based in Malambo, Atlántico, is named in his honor. Its official designation is Batallón de Ingenieros de Combate No. 2 "General Francisco Javier Vergara y Velasco".

== Publications ==
- Nueva Geografía de Colombia (1888, 1892 and 1901)
- 1818 (Guerra de Independencia), Bogotá, Imprenta Nacional (1897)
- Atlas completo de geografía colombiana (1906–1910)
- Memoria sobre la construcción de una Nueva carta geográfica de Colombia y de un Atlas completo de geografía colombiana, Bogotá, Imprenta Eléctrica (1906)
- Tratado de metodología y crítica histórica y elementos de cronología colombiana, Bogotá, Imprenta Eléctrica (1907)
- Archivos Nacionales: índice analítico, metódico y descriptivo, Bogotá, Imprenta Nacional (1913)

== Bibliography ==
- Julio César Vergara y Vergara (1952): Don Antonio de Vergara Azcarate y sus descendientes, Madrid, Imprenta J. Pueyo.
- José Agustín Blanco Barros (1995): Francisco Javier Vergara y Velasco: "Historiador, Geógrafo, Cartógrafo", In: Boletín de Historia y Antigüedades, Bogotá, Vol. LXXXII, Nº 791.
- José Agustín Blanco Barros (2006): El general Francisco Javier Vergara y Velasco y sus obras, Bogotá, Academia Colombiana de Historia.

== See Also ==
- 2nd Combat Engineer Battalion (Colombia)
