= 3rd Field Artillery Regiment (United States) =

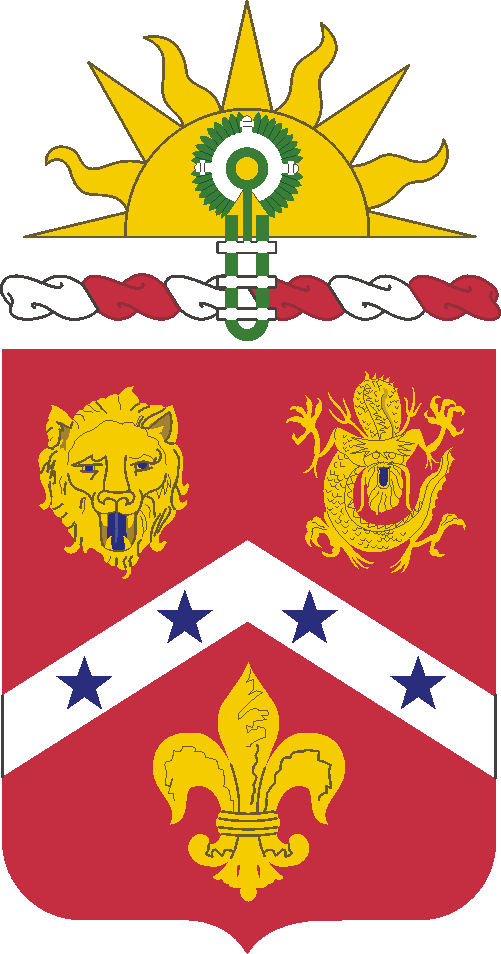
- Coat of arms
- Active: 1812
- Country: (United States)
- Branch: United States Army
- Type: Field artillery
- Role: USARS parent regiment
- Size: regiment
- Mottos: "Celeritas et Accuratio" (Speed and Accuracy)
- Branch color: Scarlet

Insignia
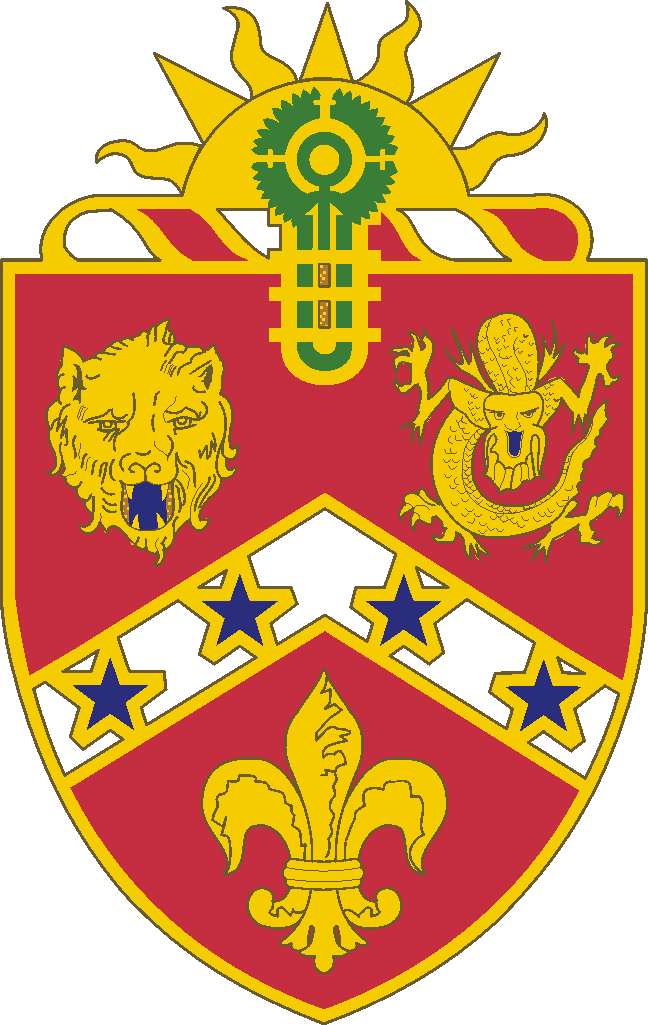
- Distinctive unit insignia

The 3rd Field Artillery Regiment is a field artillery regiment of the United States Army, first formed in 1812, although regimental units trace their lineages as far back as 1794. Based on the service of these antecedents, the regiment claims battle honors for the War of 1812, the Seminole campaign, the Mexican War, the Civil War, the Spanish–American War, and the Philippine Insurrection. The regiment served with the 6th Division during World War I, with the 5th Division, 6th Division and 2d Cavalry Division between the world wars, and with the 9th Armored Division during and after World War II. Since 1961, the regiment has been a parent regiment under the Combat Arms Regimental System and the U.S. Army Regimental System, with regimental elements serving with the 1st, 6th, and 8th Infantry Divisions; 2nd and 3rd Armored Divisions; 1st Cavalry Division; 194th Armored Brigade; and various field artillery brigades and groups. Three regimental battalions are currently active: the 2nd Battalion in the 1st Armored Division and the 1st Battalion and 5th Battalion, both a part of the 17th Field Artillery Brigade.

== History ==
Although the 3rd Field Artillery Regiment was only constituted in 1907, its constituent elements trace their history to various numbered companies of artillery dating back to 1794. 1st Battalion was organized on 30 June 1794 at Governor’s Island, New York, under the command of Captain Alexander Thompson. Under a myriad of designations, these separate batteries fought in Canada during the War of 1812, against the Seminoles during the Indian Wars, in numerous campaigns during the Mexican War and Civil War, and in both Cuba and Puerto Rico during the Spanish–American War.

The regiment's antecedents fought in the War of 1812 at the Battle of Point Iroquois, in the American Civil War at the Battle of Antietam, the Battle of Gettysburg, the Battle of Cold Harbor, the Battle of the Wilderness, and the Siege of Petersburg.

During the Philippine–American War, the regiment was sent to the Philippines. In 1899, General Loyd Wheaton, with a force under his command which included elements of the regiment, perpetrated a massacre of Filipino civilians in the town of Titatia. A. A. Barnes, a soldier in the G Battery of the regiment, wrote a letter to his brother describing the massacre:

The town of Titatia was surrendered to us a few days ago, and two companies occupy the same. Last night one of our boys was found shot and his stomach cut open. Immediately orders were received from General Wheaton to burn the town and kill every native in sight; which was done to a finish. About 1,000 men, women and children were reported killed. I am probably growing hard-hearted, for I am in my glory when I can sight my gun on some dark skin and pull the trigger.

The 3rd Field Artillery was assigned 17 November 1917 to the 6th Division, and fought in World War I. It was relieved 24 March 1923 from assignment to the 6th Division and assigned to the 5th Division; relieved 1 January 1930 from assignment to the 5th Division and assigned to the 6th Division.

The 3rd Field Artillery was relieved 25 September 1939 from assignment to the 6th Division and assigned to the 2d Cavalry Division. The personnel of the 3rd Field Artillery would serve in an armored field artillery battalion as part of the 9th Armored Division.

The 9th Armored Division landed in Normandy late in September 1944, and first went into the line, 23 October 1944, on patrol duty in a quiet sector along the Luxembourg-German frontier. When the Germans launched their winter offensive on 16 December 1944, the 9th, with no real combat experience, suddenly found itself engaged in heavy fighting. The division saw its severest action at St. Vith, Echternach, and Bastogne, its units fighting in widely separated areas. Its stand at Bastogne held off the Germans long enough to enable the 101st Airborne Division to dig in for a defense of the city. After a rest period in January 1945, the division prepared to drive across the Roer River. The offensive was launched on 28 February 1945 and the 9th crossed the Roer to Rheinbach, sending patrols into Remagen. On 7 March 1945, elements of the 9th Armored found that the Ludendorff Bridge was still standing. When German demolition charges failed to bring the bridge down, they crossed it, disarming and removing the remaining charges, which could have exploded at any time. The division exploited the bridgehead, moving south and east across the Lahn River toward Limburg, where thousands of Allied prisoners were liberated from Stalag XIIA. The division drove on to Frankfurt and then turned to assist in the closing of the Ruhr Pocket. In April it continued east, encircling Leipzig and securing a line along the Mulde River. The division was shifting south to Czechoslovakia when the war in Europe ended on 9 May 1945. All units of CCB/9 AIB of the 9th Armored Division were awarded the Presidential Unit Citation for their actions in taking and defending the Ludendorff Bridge during the Battle of Remagen in World War II. The regiment then fought in Operation Desert Storm, Operation Enduring Freedom, Operation Iraqi Freedom, and Operation Inherent Resolve.

In February 2023, the 5th Battalion, 3rd Field Artillery Regiment (5-3 LRFB) — 1st MDTF's long-range fires battalion— deployed the Long-Range Hypersonic Weapon (LRHW), a medium-range surface-to-surface hypersonic missile, from Joint Base Lewis-McChord, Tacoma, Washington to Cape Canaveral, Florida, a distance of 3,100 miles.

== Further service by regimental elements ==
The 1st Battalion, 3rd Field Artillery Regiment served with the 2nd Armored Division in Germany and at Fort Hood, Texas, from 1957 - 1991, including service in Operations Desert Shield and Storm. After a brief assignment (1991-1992) to the 1st Cavalry Division, the battalion returned to the 2nd Armored Division until inactivated in 1996. 1st Battalion of the 3rd Field Artillery Regiment was part of the 2nd Armored Division 1st Tiger Brigade from Ft. Hood Texas. 1-3 FA Battalion deployed to Operation Desert Shield and Desert Storm. Prior to the commencement of the main ground offensive, Bravo Battery provided fire support in the form of Artillery Raids to the 2nd Marine Light Armored Infantry whose mission was to scout out possible alternate breach points, identify and locate Iraqi Artillery for counter battery attack, and to draw attention away from the main forces approach points. 144 Marines along with 2 155mm SP howitzer guns from Bravo 1-3 held off increasingly mounting Iraqi forces from 10:15 am on 21 Feb through 4:00am 24 Feb, using LAV-25's, LAV-TOW's and on call Artillery support. From 29 January to 1 February the battalion would participate in the Battle of Khafji. Bravo Battery along with A Battery and C Battery 1-3 FA also participated and engaged Iraqi forces leading to the end of hostilities. The 1-3 FA Battalion had a hand in destroying or capturing 181 enemy tanks, 148 APCs, 40 artillery pieces, 27 AA emplacements, and 263 Iraqi soldiers dead with an additional 4,051 captured. The battalion earned The Naval Unit Commendation for Valor for its outstanding performance in combat against the Iraqi army. Upon return to Ft Hood the battalion was inactivated. 1-3 FA Battalion was reactivated in 2022 as a HIMARS battalion under the 17th Field Artillery Brigade and is currently stationed at Joint Base Lewis-McChord, Washington.

The 2nd Battalion, 3rd Field Artillery Regiment served with the 3rd Armored Division from 1957 to 1991, including service in Operations Desert Shield and Storm. In 1991, the battalion was then reassigned briefly to the 8th Infantry Division and then to the 1st Armored Division in 1992. The battalion served in Bosnia as part of 1st Brigade, 1st Armored Division in 1996. The battalion served in Operation Iraqi Freedom from 2004 to 2005 and 2006–7, before briefly inactivating and being reassigned from the 1st Armored Division to the 1st Brigade Combat Team, 1st Armored Division and moving to Fort Bliss, Texas, in 2008. At Fort Bliss, the battalion converted from self-propelled to towed howitzers when the 1st BCT was reorganized from an Armored BCT to a Stryker BCT. Since reorganization, the battalion has deployed to Afghanistan to participate in Operation Enduring Freedom.

The 3rd Battalion, 3rd Field Artillery Regiment served at Fort Knox, Kentucky from 1958 to 1971, with the 194th Armored Brigade from 1968 to 1971, and again from 1975 to 1983. It was then assigned to the 2nd Armored Division at Fort Hood until inactivated in 1990.

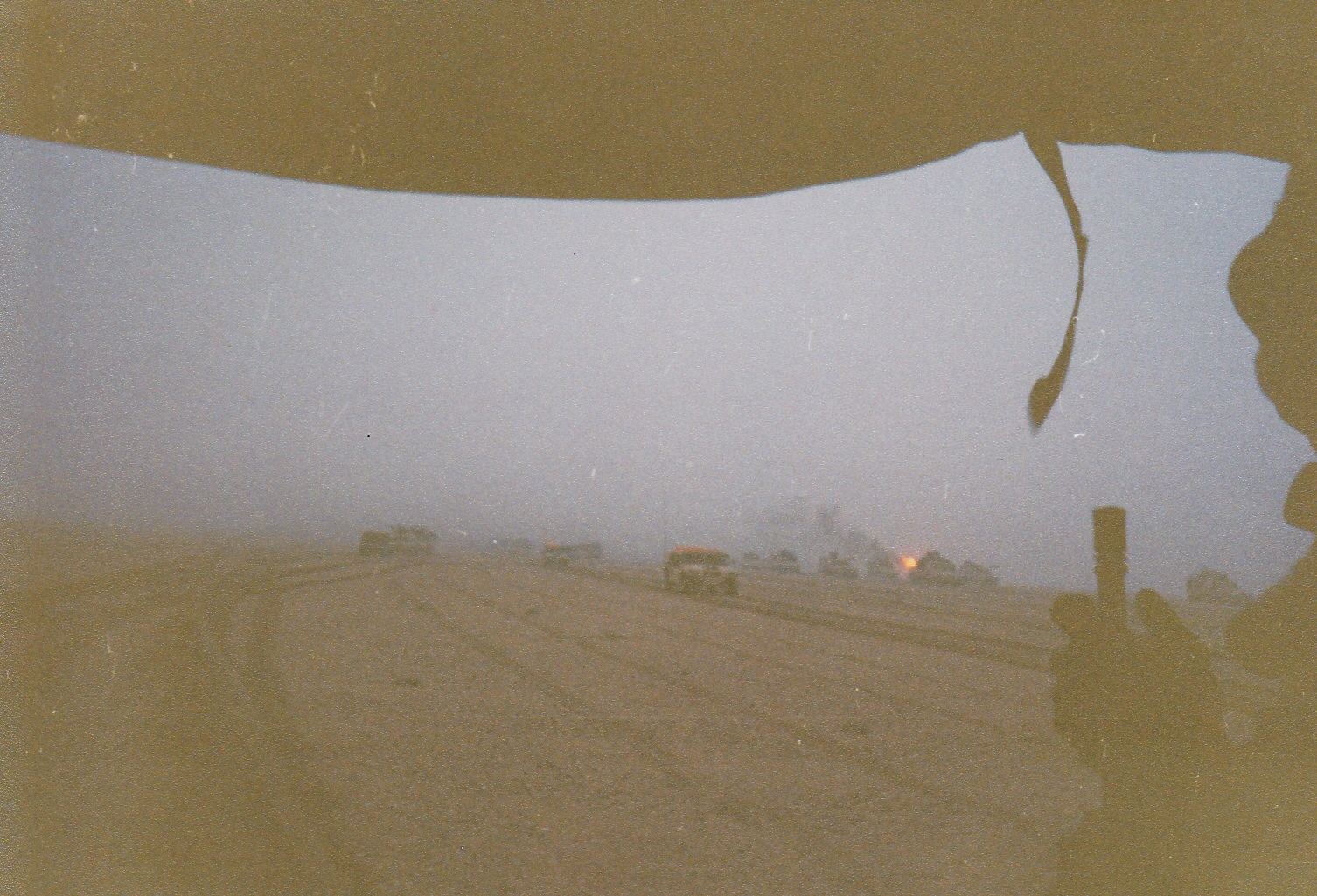
Elements of Battery C, 4th Battalion of the 3rd Field Artillery Regiment's Reconnaissance Team drive past a burning Iraqi tank. Vehicles from 4-3 FA follow closely behind during the Battle of Norfolk during the 1st Gulf War, February 1991.

After a brief period in 1960 as a separate missile battalion, the 4th Battalion, 3rd Field Artillery Regiment served at Fort Hood, Texas, with the 1st Armored Division from 1962 to 1971. Reactivated in 1983 and assigned to the 2nd Armored Division in support of the 3rd Brigade, 2nd Armored Division (Forward), the battalion deployed to Operations Desert Shield and Storm before inactivating in 1992. 4th Battalion of the 3rd Field Artillery Regiment was part of the 2nd Armored Division (Forward), stationed in Garlstedt, Germany.

During the 1st Gulf War 4-3 FA Battalion was chosen to be the main fire support element of Task Force 1-41 Infantry. It was equipped with M-109A2 self-propelled howitzers. 4-3 FA and the rest of the 2nd Armored Division(Forward) were attached to the U.S. 1st Infantry Division during the war.

On 15 February 1991 4-3 FA Battalion fired on a trailer and a few trucks in the Iraqi sector that was observing American forces.

On 16 February 1991 several groups of Iraqi vehicles appeared to be performing reconnaissance on Task Force 1-41 and were driven away by fire from 4-3 FA Battalion. That same day an Iraqi platoon, including six vehicles, was reported as being to the northeast of Task Force 1-41 Infantry. They were engaged with artillery fire from 4-3 FA. Later that evening another group of Iraqi vehicles was spotted moving towards the center of the Task Force. The vehicles appeared to be Iraqi Soviet made BTRs and tanks. For the next hour Task Force 1-41 Infantry would fight several small battles with Iraqi reconnaissance units. Task Force 1-41 Infantry fired TOW missiles at the Iraqi formation destroying one tank. The rest of the formation was destroyed or driven away by artillery fire from 4-3 FA.

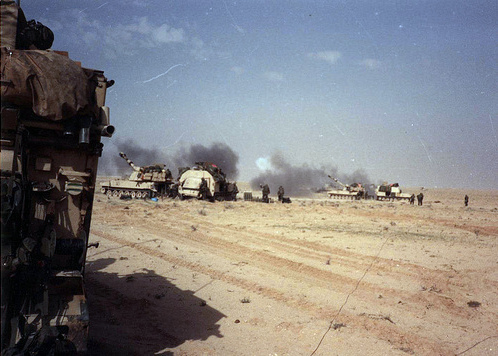
4th Battalion of the 3rd Field Artillery Regiment conducts artillery strikes on Iraqi positions during the 1st Gulf War. 4-3 FA was the primary fire support battalion for Task Force 1-41 during the 1st Gulf War, February 1991.

On 17 February 1991 4-3 FA Battalion fired on an Iraqi mortar position.

4-3 FA Battalion conducted a significant number of fire missions and artillery raids at the breach of initial Iraqi defenses. Over 14,000 artillery rounds were fired during these particular missions. These missions destroyed the vast majority of Iraq's artillery assets and inflicted heavy casualties on Iraqi infantry units. Iraq lost close to 22 artillery battalions during the initial stages of this barrage. This would include the destruction of approximately 396 Iraqi artillery pieces. One Iraqi unit that was totally destroyed during the preparation was the Iraqi 48th Infantry Division Artillery Group. The group's commander stated his unit lost 83 of its 100 guns to the artillery preparation.

On 18 February Iraqi mortar positions fired on Task Force 1-41 Infantry. 4-3 FA Battalion conducted fire missions against these Iraqi mortar positions. Later that same day 4-3 FA fired on Iraqi defensive positions.

On 23 February 1991 4-3 FA Battalion, while assigned to the 1st Infantry division, conducted fire missions against the Iraqi 26th Infantry Division.

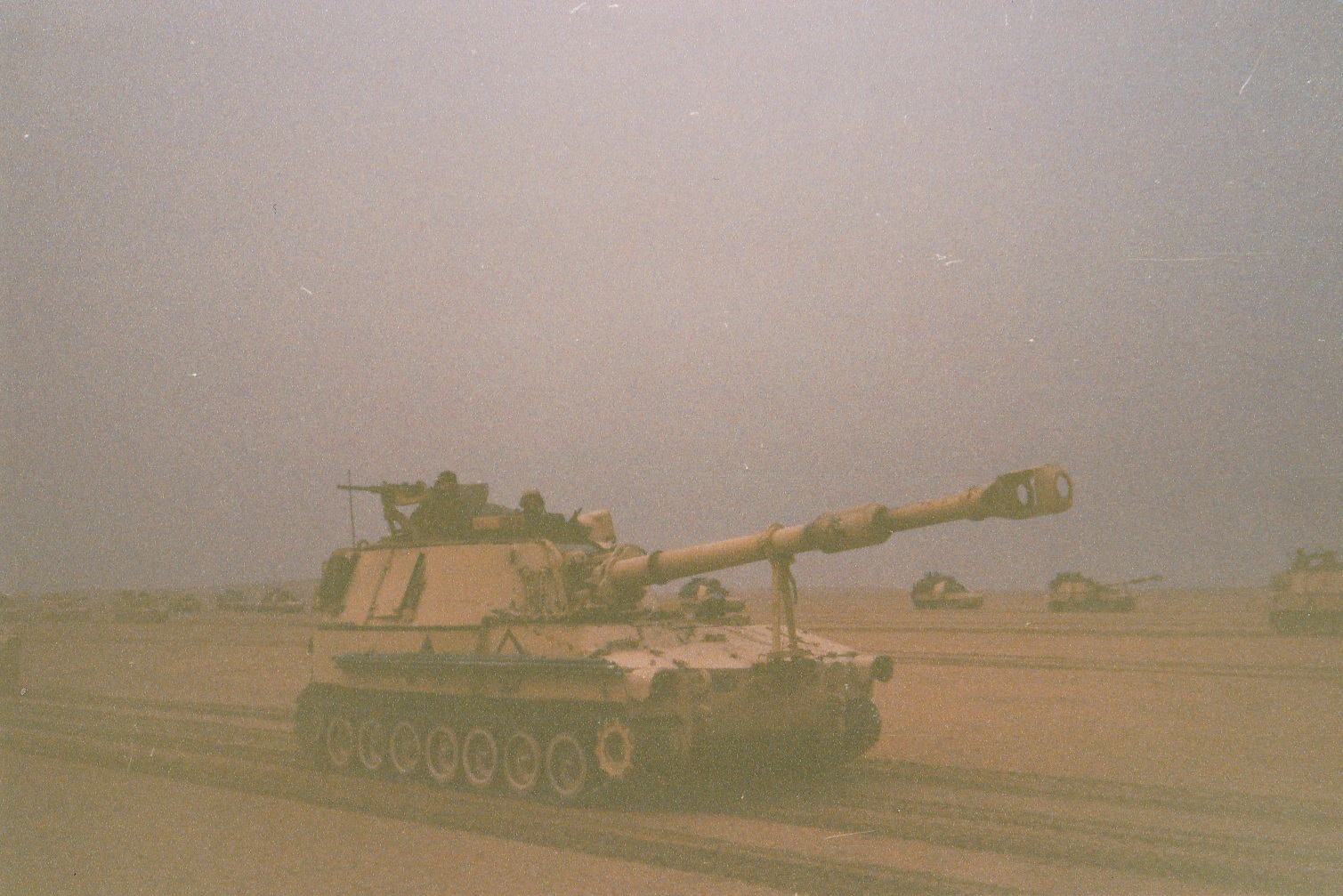
Battery C, 4th Battalion of the 3rd Field Artillery Regiment, 2nd Armored Division(FWD) moves into position to conduct fire missions during the Battle of Norfolk, February 1991.

Prior to the major ground assault, 4-3 FA Battalion participated in a 90,000 round artillery preparation against Iraqi defensive targets.

4-3 FA Battalion participated in the Battle of 73 Easting and the Battle of Norfolk. The Battle of Norfolk has been recognized by some sources as the second largest tank battle in American history and the largest tank battle of the 1st Gulf War. During the early stages of the battle 4-3 FA participated in fire missions against Iraqi targets a dozen miles to the east.

At the Battle of Norfolk 4-3 FA had a hand in the destruction of 60 Iraqi tanks and 35 Infantry fighting vehicles just west of the IPSA pipeline.

4-3 FA Battalion continued to provide fire support for the 2nd Armored Division(Fwd) as the division fought a series of short, sharp battles with Iraqi tank platoons as it moved across the Wadi al-Batin into Kuwait.

4-3 FA Battalion engaged up to eleven Iraqi divisions and inflicted thousands of casualties on the Iraqi Army and Iraq's elite Republican Guard. 4-3 FA Battalion also had a hand in the destruction of the Iraqi Jihad Corps, which consisted of the 10th and 12th Armored Divisions. The Iraqi 10th Armored Division was considered the best regular division in the Iraqi Army. It had more modern equipment than the other regular Iraqi units. It was equipped with T-72 and T-62 tanks.

Battery C, 4th Battalion of the 3rd Field Artillery Regiment was ambushed by the Republican Guard during the Battle of Norfolk, however, Battery C managed to escape without suffering any losses. Some of the other units assigned to Task Force 1-41 Infantry were not so fortunate. Multiple M1A1 Abrams tanks and Bradley IFVs were either destroyed or badly damaged during the ambush. In the fog of war there were also friendly fire incidents. The Republican Guard tank unit that was responsible for the ambush was destroyed by a Task Force 1-41 tank platoon assigned to protect 4-3 FA.

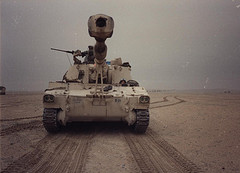
A M109A2 self-propelled howitzer, belonging to 4-3 FA Battalion, prepares to move into position to engage Iraqi forces, February 1991. 4-3 FA Battalion conducted numerous fire missions and artillery raids during the 1st Gulf War.

Battery C's Advance Party/Reconnaissance Team was also ambushed while scouting for howitzer emplacement positions. The Battery C Advance Party/Reconnaissance Team and other elements of Task Force 1-41 Infantry managed to hold their position against an Iraqi Republican Guard unit until Task Force 3-66 Armor arrived on the scene which resulted in the defeat of the Republican Guard unit and several Iraqi soldiers becoming prisoners of war.

On 27 February 1991 4-3 FA participated in a joint British and American artillery fire mission which destroyed what was left of Iraqi artillery and infantry forces at Objective Tungsten.

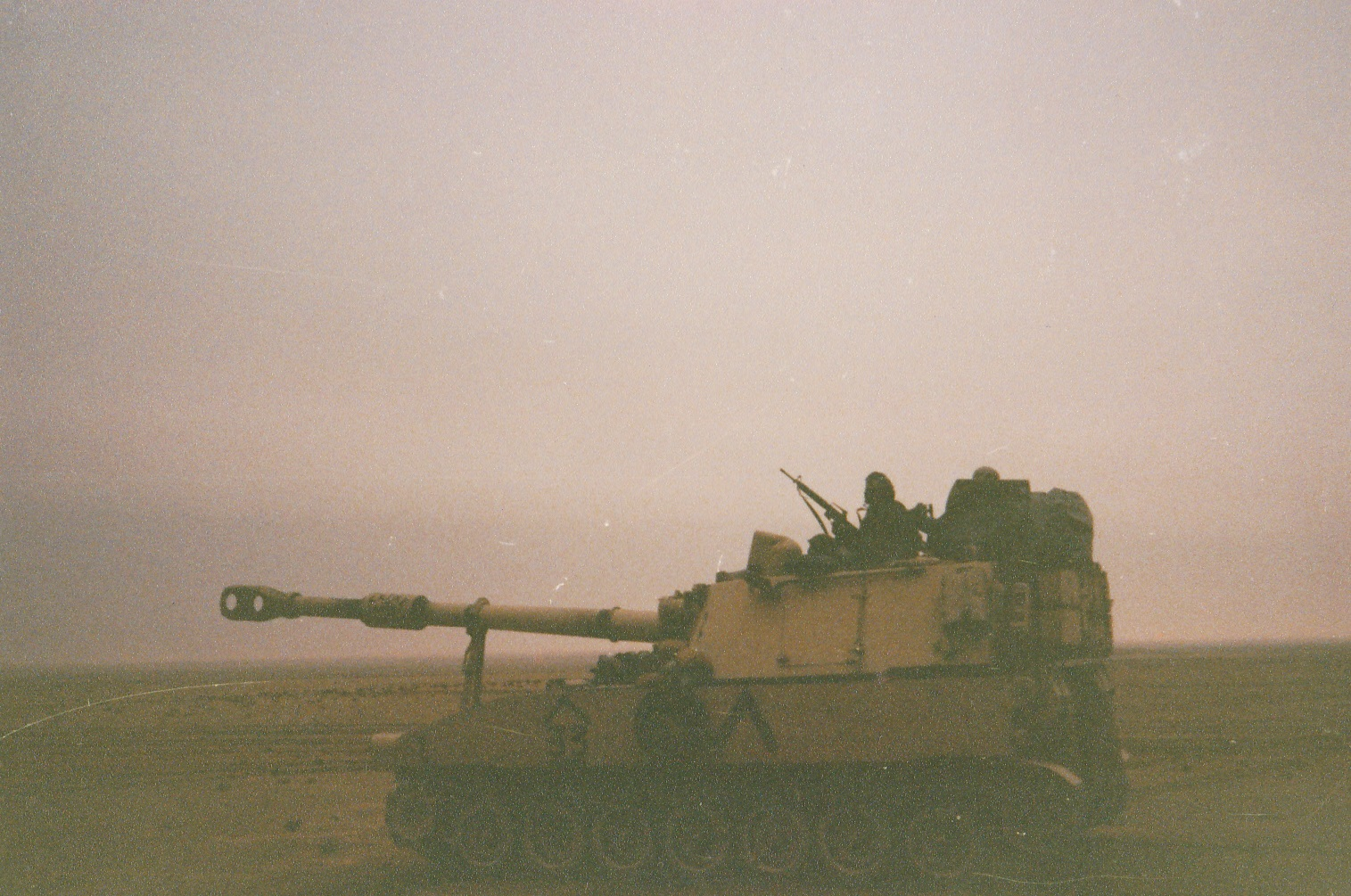
A M109A2 howitzer belonging to Battery C, 4th Battalion of the 3rd Field Artillery Regiment, 2nd Armored Division(FWD) during the Gulf War, February 1991.

4-3 FA Battalion played a significant role in the destruction of four Iraqi tank and mechanized brigades. 4-3 FA battalion and the rest of 1st Infantry Division artillery destroyed 50 tanks, 139 APCs, 30 air defense systems, 152 artillery pieces, 27 missile launchers, 108 mortars, and 548 wheeled vehicles, 61 trench lines and bunker positions, 92 dug in and open infantry targets, and 34 logistical sites. 4-3 FA Fire Support Element earned a Valorous Unit Award for its performance during combat operations.

The unit was deactivated on 15 May 1992 along with the rest of the U.S. 2nd Armored Division(Fwd).

The 5th Battalion, 3rd Field Artillery Regiment served as a missile battalion from 1960 to 1963, inactivating at Oakdale, Pennsylvania. The battalion was reactivated and assigned to the 6th Infantry Division at Fort Campbell, Kentucky, for a brief period in 1967–68. The battalion was reactivated again in 1983 in Germany, serving with the 42nd Field Artillery Brigade there. In 1992, the battalion was reassigned to Fort Sill, Oklahoma, and joined the 17th Field Artillery Brigade. The battalion deployed multiple times to Operation Iraqi Freedom, and moved with the 17th Field Artillery Brigade to Joint Base Lewis-McChord, Washington, where it is currently stationed.

== Heraldry ==
=== Distinctive unit insignia ===
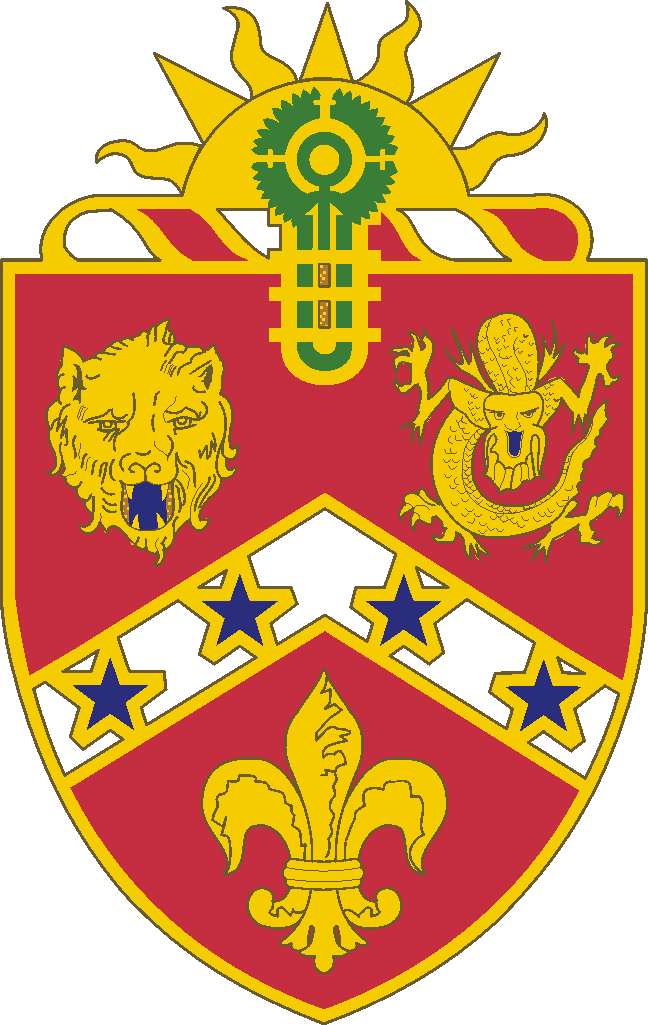

- Description

The distinctive unit insignia is an adaptation of the shield and crest of the coat of arms. The insignia is 1 1/4 inches (3.2 cm) in height.

- Symbolism

The shield is scarlet for Artillery. The Civil War is represented by the chevron and four stars, one for each battery in that war. The lion's face, dragon and fleur-de-lis allude to the War of 1812. China Relief Expedition and World War I, respectively. The rising sun indicates the regiment dates back nearly to the dawn of this country's history (Battery "D" was organized in 1802), and the Aztec banner is for the Mexican War.

- Background

The distinctive unit insignia was approved on 11 August 1922. It was redesignated for the 3d Field Artillery Battalion on 25 March 1941. It was redesignated for the 3d Armored Field Artillery Battalion on 7 December 1943. The insignia was cancelled on 19 October 1959. The insignia was restored and authorized for the 3d Field Artillery Regiment effective 1 September 1971.

=== Coat of arms ===
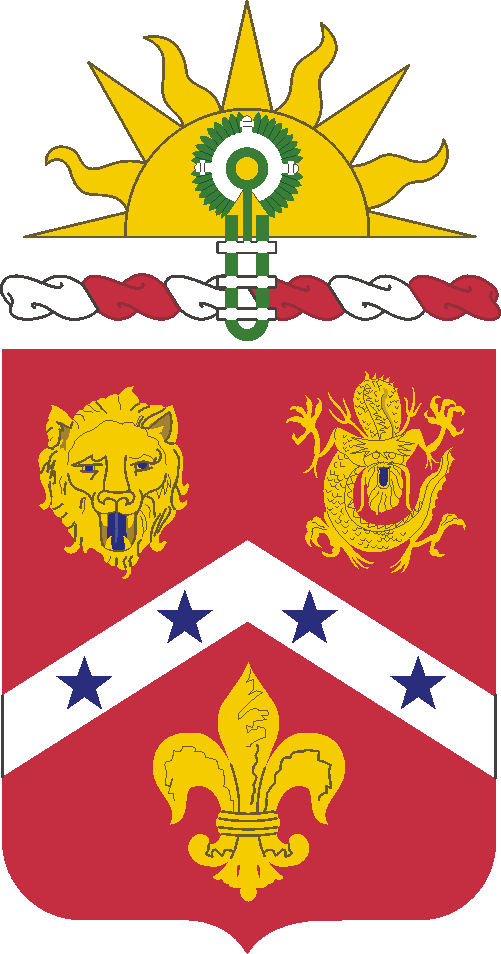

- Blazon
  - Shield: Gules, on a chevronel Argent four mullets Azure, in chief a lion's face and an imperial Chinese dragon affronté both Or, langued of the third, in base a golden fleur-de-lis.
  - Crest: On a wreath of colors Argent and Gules a demi-sun Or charged with an Aztec banner Vert garnished Argent.
- Symbolism
  - Shield: The shield is scarlet for Artillery. The Civil War is represented by the chevron and four stars, one for each battery in that war. The lion's face, dragon and fleur-de-lis allude to the War of 1812, China Relief Expedition and World War I, respectively.
  - Crest: The rising sun indicates the regiment dates back nearly to the dawn of this country's history (Battery "D" was organized in 1802), and the Aztec banner is for the Mexican War.
- Background: The coat of arms was originally approved for the 3d Field Artillery on 16 April 1921. It was amended to change the description and symbolism on 7 July 1921. It was redesignated for the 3d Field Artillery Battalion on 25 March 1941. It was redesignated for the 3d Armored Field Artillery Battalion on 7 December 1943. It was cancelled on 19 October 1959. The coat of arms was restored and authorized for the 3d Field Artillery Regiment effective 1 September 1971. The coat of arms was amended to correct the description of the shield on 30 October 2001.

== Lineage and honors ==
=== Lineage ===
- Constituted 25 January 1907 in the Regular Army as the 3d Field artillery.
- Organized 31 May 1907 from new and existing units with headquarters at Fort Sam Houston, Texas.
- Assigned 17 November 1917 to the 6th Division.

(2d Battalion inactivated 1 August 1922 at Camp George G. Meade, Maryland.)

- Inactivated (less 1st and 2d Battalions) 14 September 1922 at Camp Knox, Kentucky.

(2d Battalion activated 22 September 1922 at Fort Sheridan, Illinois; inactivated 14 December 1922 at Fort Sheridan, Illinois.)

- Relieved 24 March 1923 from assignment to the 6th division and assigned to the 5th division.

(2d Battalion consolidated 7 September 1927 with the 1st Battalion, 14th Field artillery [active] [see Annex], and consolidated unit designated as the 2d Battalion, 3d Field artillery.)

- Activated (less 1st and 2d Battalions) 24 October 1927 at Fort Mcintosh, Texas.
- Relieved 1 January 1930 from assignment to the 5th division and assigned to the 6th division.
- Inactivated (less 1st and 2d Battalions) 1 May 1930 at Fort Sheridan, Illinois.

(1st Battalion inactivated 3 December 1934 at Fort Benjamin Harrison, Indiana.)

- Relieved 25 September 1939 from assignment to the 6th division and assigned to the 2d Cavalry division.

(1st Battalion activated 1 October 1939 at Fort Riley, Kansas; 2d Battalion inactivated 1 June 1940 at Fort Sheridan, Illinois)

- Reorganized and redesignated 1 January 1941 as the 3d Field artillery Battalion.
- Reorganized and redesignated 14 July 1942 as the 3d Armored Field Artillery Battalion; concurrently, relieved from assignment to the 2d Cavalry Division and assigned to the 9th Armored Division.
- Relieved 6 July 1945 from assignment to the 9th Armored Division.
- Inactivated 20 October 1946 in Germany.
- Assigned 20 October 1950 to the 2d Armored Division.
- Activated 10 November 1950 at Fort Hood, Texas.
- Inactivated 1 July 1957 in Germany and relieved from assignment to the 2d Armored Division.
- Consolidated 15 December 1961 with Headquarters and Headquarters Battery, 3d Artillery Group; the 18th Antiaircraft Artillery Missile Battalion; and the 3d and 43d Antiaircraft Artillery Battalions (all organized in 1821 as the 3d Regiment of Artillery) to form the 3d Artillery, a parent regiment under the Combat Arms Regimental System.
- 3d Artillery (less former Headquarters and Headquarters Battery, 3d Artillery Group; 18th Antiaircraft Artillery Missile Battalion; and 3d and 43d Antiaircraft Artillery Battalions) reorganized and redesignated 1 September 1971 as the 3d Field Artillery (former elements concurrently reorganized and redesignated as the 3d Air Defense Artillery — hereafter separate lineage).
- 3d Field Artillery withdrawn 1 October 1983 from the Combat Arms Regimental System and reorganized under the United States Army Regimental System.
- Redesignated 1 October 2005 as the 3d Field Artillery Regiment

== Current status of regimental elements ==
- 1st Battalion, 3rd Field Artillery Regiment - active, assigned to the 17th Field Artillery Brigade and stationed at Joint Base Lewis-McChord, Washington
- 2nd Battalion, 3rd Field Artillery Regiment - active, assigned to the 1st Brigade Combat Team, 1st Armored Division, and stationed at Fort Bliss, Texas
- 3rd Battalion, 3rd Field Artillery Regiment - inactive since 15 September 1990
- 4th Battalion, 3rd Field Artillery Regiment - inactive since 15 May 1992
- 5th Battalion, 3rd Field Artillery Regiment - active, assigned to 1st MDTF and stationed at Joint Base Lewis-McChord, Washington
- 6th Battalion, 3rd Field Artillery Regiment - inactive since 1 June 1965
- 8th Battalion, 3rd Field Artillery Regiment - inactive since 1 September 1971

=== Campaign participation credit ===
- War of 1812: Canada
- Indian Wars: Seminoles
- Mexican War: Vera Cruz; Cerro Gordo; Contreras; Churubusco; Molino del Rey; Chapultepec; Puebla 1847
- Civil War: Peninsula; Antietam; Fredericksburg; Chancellorsville; Gettysburg; Wilderness; Spotsylvania; Cold Harbor; Petersburg; Shenandoah; Maryland 1863; Virginia 1863
- War with Spain: Santiago; Puerto Rico
- Philippine Insurrection: Streamer without inscription
- World War I: Streamer without inscription
- World War II: Rhineland; Ardennes-Alsace; Central Europe
- Southwest Asia: Defense of Saudi Arabia; Liberation and Defense of Kuwait; Cease-Fire

=== Decorations ===
- Presidential Unit Citation (Army), Streamer embroidered LUXEMBOURG (Combat Command A, 9th Armored Division, cited; DA GO 9, 2004)
- Valorous Unit Award, Streamer embroidered IRAQ (2d Battalion, 3d Field artillery, cited; DA GO 14, 1997)
- Navy Unit Commendation, Streamer embroidered SAUDI ARABIA–KUWAIT (1st Battalion, 3d Field Artillery, cited; DA GO 34, 1992)
- Army Superior Unit award, Streamer embroidered 1995–1996 (2d Battalion, 3d Field Artillery, cited; DA GO 25, 2001)

== See also ==
- Field Artillery Branch (United States)
- Task Force 1-41
- Battle of Norfolk
- Battle of 73 Easting
- Field Artillery
