= 2nd Battalion, 3rd Field Artillery Regiment =

2nd Battalion 3rd Field Artillery Regiment
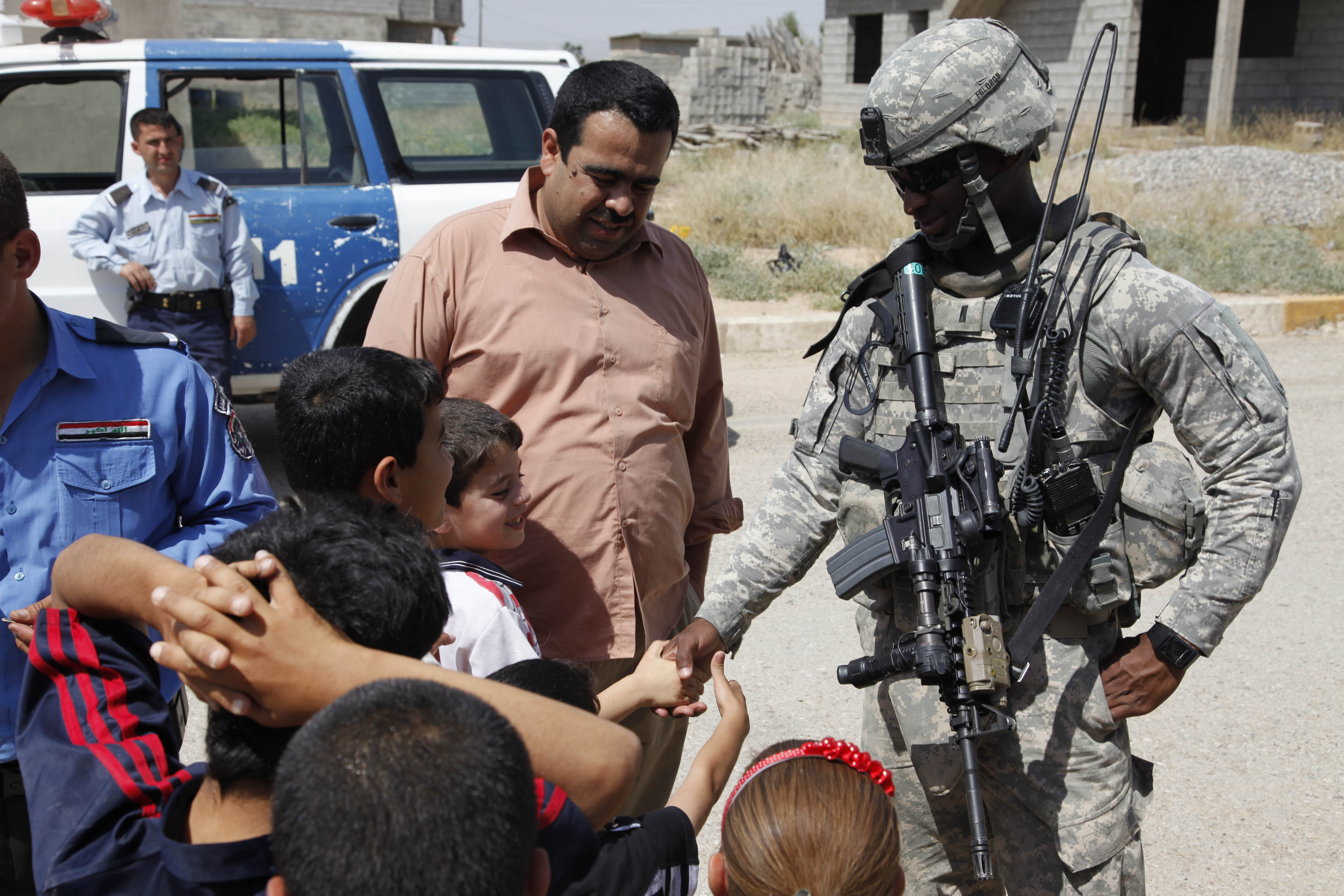
- A soldier from the 2nd Battalion, 3rd Field Artillery Regiment with Iraqi children in 2010
- Active: 11 January 1812–1934; 1939–1946; 1950–1957; 1957–Present
- Country: United States
- Branch: United States Army
- Type: Field artillery
- Role: ABCT Heavy Battalion
- Size: Battalion
- Part of: Division Artillery, 1st Armored Division
- Garrison/HQ: Fort Bliss, Texas
- Equipment: M109A7 Paladin
- Engagements: War of 1812; Seminole Wars; Mexican–American War; American Civil War; Spanish–American War; Philippine–American War; World War I World War II; Gulf War; Operation Joint Endeavor; Kosovo Peacekeeping; Iraq War; War in Afghanistan

The 2nd Battalion, 3rd Field Artillery Regiment is an artillery unit of the United States Army. The battalion traces its lineage to 1812, and it is currently assigned to the 1st Brigade Combat Team, 1st Armored Division. The battalion has served in the War of 1812, the Seminole Wars, the Civil War, the Spanish–American War, World War I, World War II, Operations Desert Shield and Desert Storm, Operation Iraqi Freedom, and Operation Enduring Freedom.

== History ==
The history of the 2nd Battalion, 3rd Field Artillery Regiment dates back to January 11, 1812, when the first GUNNERS assembled near Salisbury, North Carolina, as Capt. Donoho's Company, the 2nd Regiment of Artillery. Units of the regiment were involved in their first combat during the War of 1812 in the Canadian Campaign. The battalion has since earned numerous battle streamers including one for fighting against the Seminoles during the Indian Wars in Florida. Units of the regiment were awarded 13 battle streamers for service during the Mexican War. This included battles fought at Vera Cruz and Cerro Gordo. Less than 15 years later, the battalion earned 14 battle streamers participating in the American Civil War including campaigns at Antietam, Fredericksburg, Chancellorsville, Gettysburg, the Wilderness and Petersburg. In 1898, the battalion participated in the Santiago Campaign of the Spanish–American War. In July 1918, the unit deployed to Europe with the 6th Division for action in WWI.

In August 1944, the battalion returned to action in Europe as part of the 9th Armored Division, spending time in Britain and France. The battalion soon engaged the Germans along the Siegfried Line on Germany's western border. During the Battle of the Bulge in December 1944 and January 1945, the battalion helped relieve the garrison at Bastogne, and they later supported the drive into Germany across the Rhine River at Remagen. It smashed its way through central Germany near Wetzlar before driving northward toward Berlin and then south into Czechoslovakia before taking up occupation duty near Nurnberg. During that time in action, about eight months, the battalion earned its laurels as the unit that saw the most time in combat of any unit in the 9th Armored Division. Firing 56,426 rounds from its M7 "Priest" self-propelled 105-mm howitzers, the battalion earned the most individual decorations of any unit in the division artillery. The battalion even earned the Presidential Unit Citation for its actions taken at the onset of the "Battle of the Bulge." 2-3 Pic 2

On February 24, 1991, the battalion moved across the Iraqi border in support of Operation Desert Storm and fired their first round at the enemy since 1945. In 2004, the battalion deployed with the 1st Brigade Combat Team (Ready First), 1 Armored Division in support of Operation Iraqi Freedom to Baghdad and again in 2006 to Tal Afar and Ramadi. The battalion deactivated in 2007 in Giessen, Germany, and reactivated in 2008 as part of the Ready First Combat Team at Fort Bliss. 2-3 FA deployed as part of operation Iraqi Freedom from 2009-2010 in Kirkuk, Iraq. Following this deployment multiple changes were made to the battalion and later deployed to Shah Wali Kot District, Kandahar, Afghanistan, from December 2012 to September 2013 in support of Operation Enduring Freedom.

== Lineage and honors ==
=== Lineage ===
- Constituted 11 January 1812 in the Regular Army as a company in the 2d Regiment of Artillery
- Organized in July 1812 near Salisbury, North Carolina, as Captain Sanders Donoho's Company, 2d Regiment of Artillery
- Consolidated in December 1812 with Captain William A. Whitted's Company, 2d Regiment of Artillery (constituted 11 January 1812 and organized in the Regular Army), and consolidated unit designated as Captain Sanders Donoho's Company, 2d Regiment of Artillery
- Redesignated 12 May 1814 as Captain Sanders Donoho's Company, Corps of Artillery
- Consolidated in the summer of 1814 with Captain Jesse Robinson's Company of Artillery (constituted 11 January 1812 in the Regular Army as Captain Jesse Robinson's Company, 2d Regiment of Artillery, and organized at Camp Pinckney, Georgia) and consolidated unit designated as Captain Sanders Donoho's Company, Corps of Artillery
- Redesignated 17 May 1815 as Captain Sanders Donoho's Company, Corps of Artillery, Southern Division
- Redesignated 21 August 1816 as Company E, 1st Battalion, Corps of Artillery, Southern Division
- Consolidated 17 June 1819 with Company Q, 1st Battalion, Corps of Artillery, Southern Division (see ANNEX), and consolidated unit designated as Company E, 1st Battalion, Corps of Artillery, Southern Division
- Redesignated 1 June 1821 as Company F, 3d Regiment of Artillery
- Reorganized and redesignated 13 February 1901 as the 6th Battery, Field Artillery, Artillery Corps
- Reorganized and redesignated 31 May 1907 as Battery A, 3d Field Artillery

(3d Field Artillery assigned 17 November 1917 to the 6th Division; relieved 24 March 1923 from assignment to the 6th Division and assigned to the 5th Division; relieved 1 January 1930 from assignment to the 5th Division and assigned to the 6th Division)

- Inactivated 3 December 1934 at Fort Benjamin Harrison, Indiana

(3d Field Artillery relieved 25 September 1939 from assignment to the 6th Division and assigned to the 2d Cavalry Division)

- Activated 1 October 1939 at Fort Riley, Kansas
- Reorganized and redesignated 1 January 1941 as Battery A, 3d Field Artillery Battalion
- Reorganized and redesignated 15 July 1942 as Battery A, 3d Armored Field Artillery Battalion (Battalion concurrently relieved from assignment to the 2d Cavalry Division and assigned to the 9th Armored Division)

(3d Armored Field Artillery Battalion relieved 6 July 1945 from assignment to the 9th Armored Division)

- Inactivated 20 October 1946 in Germany

(3d Armored Field Artillery Battalion assigned 20 October 1950 to the 2d Armored Division)

- Activated 10 November 1950 at Fort Hood, Texas
- Inactivated 1 July 1957 in Germany and relieved from assignment to the 2d Armored Division
- Redesignated 30 August 1957 as Headquarters and Headquarters Battery, 2d Howitzer Battalion, 3d Artillery (organic elements concurrently constituted)
- Battalion assigned 1 October 1957 to the 3d Armored Division and activated in Germany

(Headquarters and Headquarters Battery, 2d Howitzer Battalion, 3d Artillery, consolidated 1 January 1960 with Battery C, 3d Antiaircraft Artillery Battalion [organized in 1812], and consolidated unit designated as Headquarters and Headquarters Battery, 2d Howitzer Battalion, 3d Artillery)

- Redesignated 1 September 1963 as the 2d Battalion, 3d Artillery
- Reorganized and redesignated (less former Battery C, 3d Antiaircraft Artillery Battalion) 1 September 1971 as the 2d Battalion, 3d Field Artillery (former Battery C, 3d Antiaircraft Artillery Battalion, concurrently redesignated as the 2d Battalion, 3d Air Defense Artillery—hereafter separate lineage)
- 2d Battalion, 3d Field Artillery, relieved 16 August 1991 from assignment to the 3d Armored Division and assigned to the 8th Infantry Division
- Relieved 16 January 1992 from assignment to the 8th Infantry Division and assigned to the 1st Armored Division
- Redesignated 1 October 2005 as the 2d Battalion, 3d Field Artillery Regiment

ANNEX

- Constituted 11 January 1812 in the Regular Army as a company in the 2d Regiment of Artillery
- Organized in August 1812 at Fort Moultrie, South Carolina, as Captain Jacob Bon I'on's Company, 2d Regiment of Artillery
- Redesignated 12 May 1814 as Captain Jacob Bond I'on's Company, Corps of Artillery
- Redesignated 17 May 1815 as Captain Jacob Bond I;ons Company, Corps of Artillery, Southern Division
- Redesignated 21 August 1816 as Company Q, 1st Battalion, Corps of Artillery, Southern Division

=== Campaign participation credit ===
- War of 1812: Canada
- Indian Wars: *Seminoles
- Mexican War: Vera Cruz; Cerro Gordo; Contreras; Churubusco; Molino del Rey; Chapultepec; Puebla 1847
- Civil War: *Peninsula; Antietam; *Fredericksburg; *Chancellorsville; *Gettysburg; *Wilderness; *Spotsylvania; *Cold Harbor; *Petersburg; *Shenandoah; Maryland 1863; *Virginia 1863
- War with Spain: Santiago; *Puerto Rico
- Philippine Insurrection: Streamer without inscription
- World War I: *Streamer without inscription
- World War II: *Rhineland; *Ardennes-Alsace; *Central Europe
- Kosovo, FRY: Task Force Falcon 2A, Camp Bondsteel, Camp Montieth. Jan-Jul 2000.
- Southwest Asia: *Defense of Saudi Arabia; *Liberation and Defense of Kuwait; *Cease-Fire
- War on Terrorism:
- Operation Joint Endeavor, Bosnia 1995-1996.

- Iraq: *Transition of Iraq;*Iraqi Governance; *National Resolution; *Iraqi Surge; *Iraqi Sovereignty
- Afghanistan:

=== Decorations ===
- Presidential Unit Citation (Army), Streamer embroidered LUXEMBOURG
- Presidential Unit Citation (Army), Streamer embroidered IRAQ 2004
- Meritorious Unit Commendation (Army), Streamer embroidered IRAQ 2009-2010
- Meritorious Unit Commendation (Army), Streamer embroidered AFGHANISTAN 2012-2013
- Valorous Unit Award, Streamer embroidered IRAQ 1991
- Army Superior Unit Award, Streamer embroidered 1995-1996

== Heraldry ==
=== Distinctive unit insignia ===
3rd Field Artillery Regiment Distinctive Unit Insignia

=== Coat of arms ===
3rd Field Artillery Regiment Coat of Arms

== See also ==
- 3rd Field Artillery Regiment (United States)
- 1st Brigade Combat Team, 1st Armored Division (United States)
