= 2nd Battalion, 2nd Field Artillery Regiment =

- Country: United States
- Branch: United States Army
- Type: Field artillery
- Role: Direct Support Field Artillery
- Size: Battalion
- Garrison/HQ: Fort Sill, OK
- Nickname: "Big Deuce" Battalion
- Equipment: M119A3 Howitzer

Commanders
- Battalion Commander: LTC Michael Lengel
- Command Sergeant Major: CSM James McFarland

The 2nd Battalion, 2nd Field Artillery Regiment ("2-2 FAR”) is the United States Army's Direct Support field artillery battalion; assigned to the 428th Field Artillery Brigade and stationed at Fort Sill, OK. Founded in 1775 as the Second Artillery Regiment, the Battalion now carries the lineage of the 18th Battery, Artillery Corps, and carries campaign credit for the Philippine Insurrection, World War I, and World War II.

== Mission ==
2-2 FAR remains air mobile, capable of delivering fires, and providing logistics in support of the Fires Center of Excellence, the U.S. Army Field Artillery, and U.S. Marine Corps Field Artillery. On order, 2-2 FAR executes ceremonial salutes for the Fires Center of Excellence and Fort Sill. It is considered to be the "Base Piece" of Field Artillery and the only Direct Support Field Artillery Battalion on Fort Sill.

== History ==
It is change of command season all around the Army and there is no better send off then firing your last round on the gunline surrounded by the Soldiers of your battalion.

Throughout American Military History, the Second is there. Second Battalion, Second Field Artillery Regiment claims the honor of being one of the Army's oldest and distinguished Field Artillery Battalions.

In 1775, COL. Richard Gridley founded the Massachusetts regiment, the first American artillery unit to fire against the British in the Revolutionary War. In 1780, the Second Artillery Regiment served mainly in the northern sector and was at Yorktown when the war ended, at a time when the infant nation almost entirely disbanded its military forces, forcing the Second into retirement.

In the War of 1812, the Second Artillery Regiment was there at Fort McHenry, where Francis Scott Key was inspired to write, “The Star Spangled Banner.” The bombs bursting in air were those of the Second. At the close of the war, the Second Artillery Regiment was again deactivated. However, a new Second Artillery Regiment was created by an Act of Congress, March 21, 1821. This time, the organization was to enjoy a continuous and active career for the next 80 years.

It was during the 11 years of duty in the south keeping peace and order among the Cherokee, Creek, and Seminole Indian tribes that fortune frowned upon the Second, specifically, ‘Charlie’ Battery, under the command of Major Francis L. Dade. Dade set out on a routine scouting patrol through the swamps between St. Augustine and Tampa, Florida Christmas Eve, 1835. With 112 men from the 4th Infantry and 2nd and 3rd Artillery, Dade tried unsuccessfully to fight off an ambush orchestrated by Osceola, chief of the Seminoles. The unit fought valiantly to the last man. All but two men perished and these were seriously wounded. This event is known as the “Dade Massacre”.

The Second was also instrumental in the rescue of Charleston, South Carolina, engulfed in the flames of the immense fire General Winfield Scott—later to become the Commanding General of the Army—ordered 400 men to the city to assist in subduing the fire. They arrived just in time to relieve the exhausted citizens at the pumps and aided in rebuilding the city. During the Mexican War, under General Worth, the Second was instrumental in capturing Vera Cruz and Mexico City. The unit distinguished itself in many other battles during the war, Cerro Gordo, Contreras, Churubusco, Molina Del Ray, and Chapultepec.

In 1853, the regiment was assigned to duty on the frontier and remained until 1861. By this time, the batteries were horse mounted and served conspicuously throughout the Civil War, The Regiment fired the first shots at Gettysburg. Its weapons were felt from Fort Pickens to Bull Run, Williamsburg to Mechanicsville and Antietam to Gettysburg. The defense of Fort Pickens is of particular significance to the unit since it was the only post south of Fort Monroe to remain loyal to the Federal Government throughout the war. Regimental designators of artillery units were dropped in 1901, and Corps organizations were adopted.

On May 31, 1907, the 17th and 18th Batteries of the Second Field Artillery Regiment were redesigned as batteries “Able” and “Baker” respectively. Both batteries had a distinguished record for skirmishes with the Moros and Mindamo, Philippine Islands, 1903–1905. The Second, though an artillery unit, many times was forced to engage in hand-to-hand combat with the feared Moros. The Regiment was stationed in the Philippines from 1913 until it returned to the United States in 1917 and 1918. By the time, the regiment returned from the Philippines, World War I was in full swing and the Second had just enough time to come to Fort Sill for additional training before departing for Brest, France, November 9. 1918. The Second remained for the duration of the war, however, they were deactivated for the third time at Fort Bragg, North Carolina, February 1922.

The 12-year period that followed the Second Field Artillery in Panama is considered by some to be the most interesting peacetime service the Army's historic field artillery organization. It was this period that provided the Second with many of its traditions, insignia, and its motto, “The Second First”.

During its long Panama Service, the Second Field Artillery established many records. Lt. COL. Edmund Gruber, commander of the Second and author of “The Caisson Song”, led the regiment to a long line of ‘Second First’. Among these were a record-breaking jungle march in which the battalion, then a 75mm mule-pack howitzer outfit, crossed the Isthmus of Panama cross-country in just four days. Another first was racked up when the Second later became the United States Army artillery outfit to be transported across the Isthmus of Panama by air in a matter of hours. In Panama, ‘Able’ Battery won the coveted Know Trophy, the las time the famous trophy was awarded. The award was presented to the most efficient firing battery in the entire Field Artillery. World War II provided the Second with another opportunity to serve its country with distinction. Shipped to France in 1944, it fought in the campaigns of France, central Europe, and the Rhineland. The Battalion arrived at Sainte-Mère-Église, France on August 66, 1944, and was assigned to the VIII Corps, Third United States Army. Attached to Task Force ‘B’, the battalion reinforced the artillery fires of the Plougastel-Daoulas Peninsula from the Dirinon, France on August 22, 1944. At Brest, France, the battalion reinforced the artillery fires of the Second and Eighth Infantry Divisions.

The Second was then assigned to the Ninth United States Army and moved to the Army Concentration Area at Tongres, Belgium October 27, 1944. The Second's mission was to provide general support for the XIII and XIX Corps, North Army and to reinforce the fires of the 5th Armored Division and the 29th and 102nd Infantry Division. The end of World War II found the Second Field Artillery Battalion attached to the 70th Infantry Division.

In Korea, a battery of the Second, equipped with 105 mm howitzers, represented the battalion. The battery supported the R.O.K. troops in the battle of the White Horse Mountain that will long be remembered by hundreds of American Soldiers.

The unit was re-designated the Second Field artillery Battalion (Rocket) July 31, 1949. It was here that another first was chalked up in that the 2/2 FAR was the first battalion to be racially integrated – designated as Troop Battery, 2nd Rocket Artillery Battalion.. At this time it returned to Fort Sill, firing demonstrations for the Artillery and Guided Missile School, on a routine but important mission to bolster America's defenses. A year and a half later, the Second was once again reorganized and re-designated the Second Field Artillery Battalion.

2nd Field Artillery Battalion moved to New Post Fort Sill in 1953, and an effort was made to give morale a boost. It was decided that the Unit Crest, a Mule with a Mountain Gun, should be reproduced in real life. A donkey was procured and a stable built on the flat behind the headquarters. The donkey was named “Big Deuce”. Replaced several times, Big Deuce VII remains the mascot for the Regiment.

In June 1958, it was again re-designated Second Howitzer Battalion, Second Field Artillery. Since then, Fort Sill has been home for 2-2 Field Artillery Regiment. It now has the mission of supporting the US Army and US Marine Corps Field Artillery School and is the only Direct Support Field Artillery Battalion stationed at the home of US Field Artillery.

== Lineage and honors ==
=== Lineage ===
- Constituted 13 February 1901 in the Regular Army as the 18th Battery, Field Artillery, Artillery Corps
- Organized 20 June 1901 at the Presidio of San Francisco, California
- Reorganized and redesignated 6 June 1907 as Battery B, 2d Field Artillery
- (2d Field Artillery assigned 31 January 1918 to the 8th Division; relieved 5 September 1919 from assignment to the 8th Division)
- Inactivated 2 February 1922 at Camp Bragg, North Carolina
- Activated 1 August 1922 at Camp Bragg, North Carolina, as an element of the 4th Division
- Inactivated 5 September 1927 at Fort Bragg, North Carolina, and relieved from assignment to the 4th Division
- (2d Field Artillery assigned 17 March 1930 to the Panama Canal Division)
- Consolidated 30 April 1930 with Battery B, 2d Field Artillery Battalion (active) (constituted 1 September 1927 in the Regular Army and activated at Fort Davis, Canal Zone), and consolidated unit designated as Battery B, 2d Field Artillery
- (2d Field Artillery relieved 15 April 1932 from assignment to the Panama Canal Division)
- Reorganized and redesignated 13 January 1941 as Battery B, 2d Field Artillery Battalion
- Inactivated 29 March 1946 at Camp Kilmer, New Jersey
- Activated 1 August 1946 at Fort Sill, Oklahoma
- Redesignated 20 January 1948 as Battery B, 2d Rocket Field Artillery Battalion
- Redesignated 31 July 1949 as Battery B, 2d Field Artillery Battalion
- Reorganized and redesignated 25 June 1958 as Headquarters and Headquarters Battery, 2d Howitzer Battalion, 2d Artillery (organic elements constituted 2 June 1958 and activated 25 June 1958)
- (Headquarters and Headquarters Battery, 2d Howitzer Battalion, 2d Artillery, consolidated 15 December 1961 with Battery B, 2d Antiaircraft Artillery Battalion [organized in 1812], and consolidated unit designated as Headquarters and Headquarters Battery, 2d Howitzer Battalion, 2d Artillery)
- Redesignated 15 March 1968 as the 2d Battalion, 2d Artillery
- Reorganized and redesignated (less former Battery B, 2d Antiaircraft Artillery Battalion) 1 September 1971 as the 2d Battalion, 2d Field Artillery (former Battery B, 2d Antiaircraft Artillery Battalion, concurrently redesignated as the 2d Battalion, 2d Air Defense Artillery — hereafter separate lineage)
- 2d Battalion, 2d Field Artillery, inactivated 1 April 1980 at Fort Sill, Oklahoma
- Activated 1 August 1981 at Fort Sill, Oklahoma
- Headquarters transferred 2 October 1991 to the United States Army Training and Doctrine Command and reorganized at Fort Sill, Oklahoma (remainder of battalion concurrently inactivated)
- Redesignated 1 October 2005 as the 2d Battalion, 2d Field Artillery Regiment

=== Campaign participation credit ===
- Philippine Insurrection: Jolo 1903; Jolo 1904; Jolo 1905
- World War I: *Streamer without inscription
- World War II: *Northern France; *Rhineland; *Central Europe

== Heraldry ==
=== Distinctive unit insignia ===
2nd Field Artillery Regiment (United States)#Distinctive Unit Insignia

=== Coat of arms ===
2nd Field Artillery Regiment (United States)#Coat of Arms

== See also ==
- Big Deuce VII
