= 2nd Battalion, 27th Field Artillery Regiment =

2nd Battalion, 27th Field Artillery
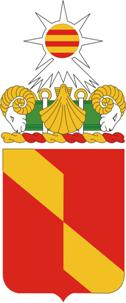
- 27th Field Artillery Regiment coat of arms
- Active: 1918–1919; 1940–1948; 1951–1957; 1957–1988
- Country: United States
- Branch: Regular Army
- Type: Field artillery
- Size: Battalion
- Part of: 3rd Armored Division Artillery
- Garrison/HQ: Ray Barracks
- Motto: Conjuncti Stamus (United We Stand)
- Engagements: World War II
- Decorations: Croix de Guerre with Palm

Insignia
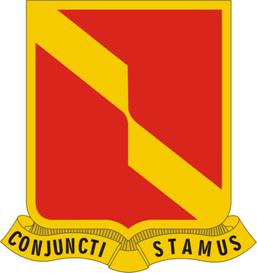
- Distinctive unit insignia

The 2nd Battalion, 27th Field Artillery Regiment (2-27 FA) is an inactive field artillery battalion of the United States Army, last assigned to the 3rd Armored Division Artillery before its inactivation in 1988. Its parent regiment is the 27th Field Artillery Regiment.

First constituted during World War I as Battery B of the 27th Field Artillery, it remained stateside with the 9th Division. The battery was reactivated as part of the 27th in 1940 and served with the 27th Armored Field Artillery Battalion during World War II with the 1st Armored Division. Postwar, it briefly formed part of the United States Constabulary in Germany before being inactivated yet again in 1948. During most of the 1950s the battery and its battalion served with the 1st Armored Division after being reactivated, but again inactivated due to the Combat Arms Regimental System reorganization in 1957. Under the reorganization the battery became the 2nd Battalion of the regiment, serving with the 3rd Armored Division in Germany for most of the Cold War, before being inactivated and reflagged in 1988.

== History ==
The battalion was constituted during World War I on 5 July 1918 as Battery B of the 27th Field Artillery, a National Army unit, part of the 9th Division. The battery was organized on 2 August at Camp McClellan, Alabama, but remained stateside and was demobilized there after the end of the war on 8 February 1919. The battery was reconstituted, but remained inactive, with the 9th Division on 24 March 1923; its regiment was relieved from that division on 1 October 1933.

On 15 July 1940 the battery was reactivated with the 27th Field Artillery Battalion (FAB) at Fort Knox, assigned to the 1st Armored Division. On 1 January 1942 the 27th FAB became an armored unit, the 27th Armored Field Artillery Battalion (AFAB). With the 27th AFAB, Battery B fought in North Africa and Italy during World War II, receiving the Croix de Guerre with Palm for actions in Central Italy. The battery was one of the first 1st Armored Division units to arrive in Italy during Operation Avalanche, the Salerno landings in September 1943. Alongside Battery C, it went into action on the night of 11 September, covering a key stream crossing with direct fire. On 12 September both batteries pulled back to support the 45th Infantry Division with indirect fire, helping to repel the strongest German counterattack against the beachhead between 12 and 14 September. On the night of 13 September, the seven M7 Priest 105 mm self-propelled howitzers of the battery fired 300 rounds against the German counterattack.

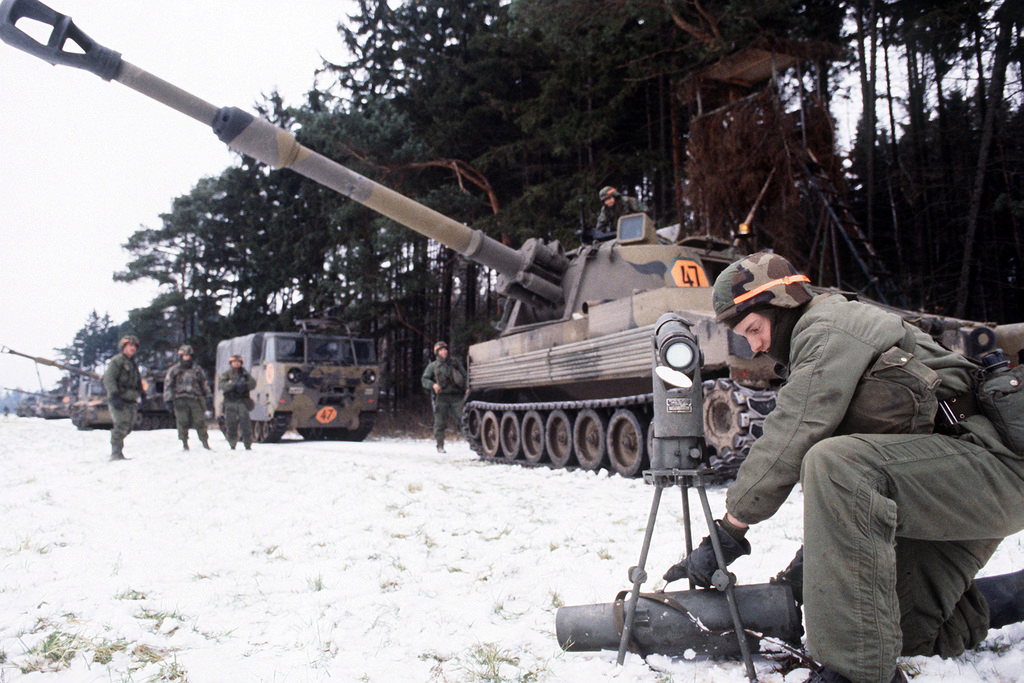
A soldier of Battery B setting up a collimator to sight in a howitzer during Exercise Reforger '85, with an M109A2 self-propelled howitzer in the background

After the end of the war, it garrisoned Allied-occupied Germany after being redesignated as Troop B of the 27th Constabulary Squadron (formed from the 27th AFAB), part of the 14th Constabulary Regiment. On 20 December 1948, the squadron was inactivated, returning to its former designation and assignment, when the 14th became a regular unit again with the intensification of the Cold War.

The battalion was reactivated at Fort Hood with the division on 7 March 1951. On 15 February 1957, it was inactivated yet again at Fort Polk and relieved from its assignment to the division. On 30 August 1957, it became the 2nd Howitzer Battalion of the 27th Artillery under the Combat Arms Regimental System. 2-27 FA was activated in Germany on 1 October, assigned to the 3rd Armored Division Artillery. It took over the personnel and equipment of the 3rd Armored's 67th Armored Field Artillery Battalion, armed with the M52 105 mm self-propelled howitzer.

On 1 October 1963 it dropped the howitzer designation, with its parent regiment being redesignated as the 27th Field Artillery on 1 September 1971. The battalion was based at Ray Barracks, Friedberg, Germany, as a direct support unit for the 3rd Brigade of the 3rd Armored Division, armed with the 155 mm self-propelled howitzer. It included three batteries with six howitzers each. On 16 January 1988, 2-27 FA was inactivated and relieved from its assignment to the 3rd Armored. Its personnel and equipment were transferred to the simultaneously reactivated 2nd Battalion, 82nd Field Artillery.

=== Known commanders ===
- Lieutenant Colonel Roy T. Scales (as of 1 October 1987)
