= 2nd Grodno Battalion of the King and Commonwealth =

- Active: 1783–1791
- Country: Grand Duchy of Lithuania
- Type: Infantry

The 2nd Grodno Battalion of the King and Commonwealth (Polish: Bataljon 2-gi JKMCI i RZPLITEJ Grodzieński.) was a military unit of the Grand Duchy of Lithuania.

== History ==
This infantry battalion was absorbed into the 7th Lithuanian Infantry Regiment in 1790.

== Commanders ==
No.	Portrait	Commander	Took office	Left office	Time in office
1	Jan Müntz	Major; Jan Müntz	1783	1783	363 days
2	Jan Möser	Porucznik; Jan Möser	1785	1791	6 years, 0 days

== Bibliography ==
=== References ===
- Gembarzewski, Bronisław (1925), Rodowody pułków polskich i oddziałów równorzędnych od r. 1717 do r. 1831 (in Polish), Warszawa: Towarzystwo Wiedzy Wojskowej
- Rospond, Vincent W. (2013). Commonwealth Armies of the Partitions 1770–1794. Great Britain: Osprey Publishing. ISBN 978-1-84908855-8.
