= 2nd Combat Engineer Battalion (Colombia) =

- Batallón de Ingenieros de Combate No. 2 "General Francisco Javier Vergara y Velasco"
- Active: January 1975–present
- Country: Colombia
- Branch: National Army of Colombia
- Type: Combat engineer
- Part of: 2nd Brigade, 1st Division (Colombia)|1st Division
- Garrison/HQ: Malambo, Atlántico
- Nickname: BIVER
- Patron: Francisco Javier Vergara y Velasco

The 2nd Combat Engineer Battalion "General Francisco Javier Vergara y Velasco" (Spanish: Batallón de Ingenieros de Combate No. 2 "General Francisco Javier Vergara y Velasco"), also known by its military abbreviation BIVER, is a combat engineering unit of the Colombian National Army. Based in Malambo, Atlántico Department, it is subordinate to the Second Brigade of the First Division.

The battalion is named in honor of General Francisco Javier Vergara y Velasco, a Colombian military officer, geographer, cartographer, and historian.

== History ==
The battalion was activated in Barranquilla in January 1975 by the ministry of defense of Colombia. During its early decades, the battalion undertook military engineering and infrastructure projects throughout Colombia´s Caribbean region. Its activities included engineering, infrastructure construction, support security operations and cooperation with civilians.

== See also ==
- National Army of Colombia
- Military engineering
- Francisco Javier Vergara y Velasco
