= 2nd Maryland Cavalry Battalion =

Infantry battalion of the Confederate States Army

- Maryland Secessionists Flag
- Active: March, 1862–February 4, 1865
- Allegiance: Confederate States of America
- Branch: Volunteer Army
- Type: Cavalry
- Nickname(s): Gilmor's Partisan Rangers
- Engagements: American Civil War; Shenandoah Valley; Maryland Campaign

Commanders
- Notable commanders: Colonel Harry Gilmor

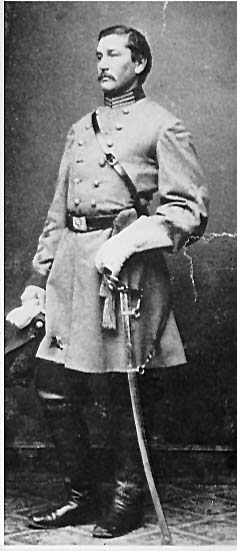
Col. Harry Gilmor, 2nd Maryland Cavalry

The 2nd Maryland Cavalry Battalion, a.k.a. Gilmor's Partisan Rangers, was a Confederate unit in the American Civil War.

== History ==
The unit was founded and commanded by Colonel Harry Gilmor. Gilmor was a member of the Towson Guards (a.k.a. Baltimore Horse Guards), when the Civil War started. Due to his political views, he was taken prisoner by the U.S. Federal government and imprisoned at Fort McHenry. After he was released, he went to the Shenandoah Valley to join the Confederate Army. He served as a scout for Colonel Turner Ashby, General J. E. B. Stuart's predecessor. Gilmor joined as a private, but was quickly promoted to sergeant major. In March, 1862, he had raised his own company, which was attached to the 12th Virginia Cavalry. Gilmor served with General Stonewall Jackson at the Battle of McDowell in May 1862. Gilmor's Cavalry Company spent the next three months scouting, serving as couriers and harassing enemy camps and trains. In September 1862, Harry Gilmor was with General Jackson when he crossed the Potomac River into Maryland. While in Maryland, Gilmor went on "French leave", to see his family in Towson, Maryland, just north of Baltimore. While en route to his family home, Glen Ellen Plantation, Gilmor was taken prisoner by Union Forces.

Gilmor would spend six months as a prisoner-of-war, but was back with Confederate Forces as part of a prisoner exchange in early 1863, and served as aide-de-camp for General J.E.B. Stuart at the Battle of Kelly's Ford in March 1863.

Shortly after the battle, Harry Gilmor petitioned to raise his own cavalry regiment. He organized several companies of mostly Marylanders into a unit that called themselves "The Band".

Occasionally, Gilmor's Battalion fought alongside other units such as McNeill's Rangers, and the 1st Maryland Cavalry, CSA. During the Confederate campaign into Maryland in June 1863, Harry Gilmor was temporarily placed in command of the 1st Maryland Cavalry, after its commander was wounded in combat.

After the Gettysburg Campaign, the Confederate Army returned to Virginia. During this time, Gilmor had 6 full companies of rangers operating in the Shenandoah Valley. They conducted mainly guerrilla-type operations against Union wagon trains, railroads, telegraph lines, depots, bridges and encampments.

In June 1864, Gilmor's Battalion was designated as the 2nd Maryland Cavalry. The 1st & 2nd Maryland Cavalry units became involved in almost daily skirmishes with Union General Sheridan's cavalry. Colonel Gilmor was seriously wounded near Bunker Hill, West Virginia on September 3, 1864, and did not return to action until October, missing the Battle of Opequon and the Battle of Fisher's Hill. In February 1865, the 2nd Maryland went into West Virginia to forage for supplies, and to meet up with McNeill's Rangers. In the process, Colonel Harry Gilmor was captured on February 4, 1865, and taken to Fort Warren, Massachusetts.

== See also ==
- Maryland Civil War Confederate Units
- Lists of American Civil War Regiments by State
