= 12th Arkansas Cavalry Regiment =

12th Arkansas Cavalry
- Active: 1864–1865
- Disbanded: May 26, 1865
- Country: CSA
- Allegiance: Confederate States of America
- Branch: Cavalry
- Size: Regiment
- Engagements: American Civil War: Price's Missouri Raid; Battle of Fort Davidson; Fourth Battle of Boonville; Battle of Glasgow, Missouri; Battle of Sedalia; Second Battle of Lexington; Battle of Little Blue River; Second Battle of Independence; Battle of Byram's Ford; Battle of Westport; Battle of Marais des Cygnes, Linn County, Kansas; Battle of Mine Creek; Battle of Marmiton River; Second Battle of Newtonia

The 12th Arkansas Cavalry Regiment (1864–1865) was a Confederate Army cavalry regiment during the American Civil War. The unit was first organized as the 2nd Battalion, Arkansas State Troops.

== Organization ==
12th Arkansas Cavalry Regiment was originally organized as a group of Volunteer Companies raised from the militia regiments of southern Arkansas, immediately following the fall of Little Rock, Arkansas, to Union forces in September 1863. Governor Harris Flanagin began organizing a new force of state troops issuing a proclamation on August 10, 1863, just a month before the capitol fell, announcing that he had been authorized to raise new regiments of state troops and that by special agreement these new units could not be transferred out of the state by Confederate authorities.

After the fall of Little Rock, recruiting was far more difficult than it had been in the first years of the war. The constant transfer of Arkansas troops into the eastern theater of the war, across the Mississippi River from their homes, was a major objection by the remaining population of men eligible for military service. With Federal forces now occupying the state capitol, the Confederate state government had no way of enforcing conscription laws in the counties behind the Union lines, except during raids by Generals Sterling Price and Joseph O. Shelby in 1864. The remaining Confederate regiments were plagued by desertions.

On September 16, 1863, in the immediate aftermath of the fall of the state capitol, Governor Flanagin issued General Order No. 6 from Arkadelphia, which called into service the militia regiments of the counties of Clark, Hempstead, Sevier, Pike, Polk, Montgomery, La Fayette, Ouachita, Union, and Columbia in order to resist the Federal army. The Governor's order directed the regiments to march to Arkadelphia, Arkansas, at the earliest possible day. Companies were to be mounted and commanders were to compel persons evading the call to come to the rendezvous. The intent was to form companies of twelve-month mounted volunteers. Only six physicians, one druggist, millers to supply the wants of the country, clerks, sheriffs, postmasters, and persons in the employ of the Confederate States were exempted from the order.

In describing this call in a letter to General Theophilus H. Holmes dated October 18, 1863, from Washington, Arkansas, the new Confederate state capitol, Flanagin stated that he issued the order calling out the militia, as an experiment, expecting to get volunteers. The order succeeded so well as to get companies organized in the counties where the call for the militia was enforced which resulted in seven companies being collected under the call. Flanagin also stated that "the troops raised by the State are more than double all the troops raised by volunteering, or by the conscript law, within the past few months".

=== 2nd Battalion, Arkansas State Troops ===
John Crowell Wright, lieutenant colonel of the 26th Arkansas Infantry Regiment, resigned from that regiment to take command of a newly organized battalion of cavalry. On December 17, 1863, the 2nd Battalion, Arkansas State Troops, was organized with seven companies from southern Arkansas. There is one extant muster roll for the Field and Staff, covering the period January 1 to February 29, 1864, when the regiment was stationed at Cut Off, Drew County, Arkansas. The other regimental officers were Lieutenant Colonel James W. Bowie, Major George M. Wright, Surgeon John H. Saunders, Assistant Quartermaster Algernon S. Crute and Sergeant-Major Howell Johnson. The unit was composed of the following volunteer companies raised from southern Arkansas:

- Company A – This company enlisted at Camden, Arkansas, on December 10, 1863, composed mostly of men from Bradley County, Arkansas. The following endorsement accompanied the muster roll: "My Company was organized at Camden, Arkansas, on the 10th day of Dec. 1863, and have been in the direction of the Arkansas river ever since. /s/ JNO. T. KIRK, Capt. Comdg. Co."
- Company B – This company enlisted at Monticello, Arkansas, on October 15, 1863, composed mostly of men from Drew County, Arkansas. The following endorsement accompanied the muster roll: "Company organized at Monticello, Arks, Oct. the Fifteenth, 1863. Have been scouting and picketing ever since. /s/ W. P. BURKS, Capt. Co. B."
- Company C – This company enlisted in Drew County, Arkansas, on November 3, 1863, composed mostly of men from Drew County, Arkansas. The muster roll was signed by Capt. John W. Messenger.
- Company D – This company enlisted at Camden, Arkansas, on December 7, 1863, composed mostly of men from Calhoun County, Arkansas. The following endorsement accompanied the muster roll: "This Company was organized at Camden, Dec. the 7th, 1863. Have been engaged in Picketting, Scouting, Drilling and Marching. Have been in no engagements up to this time. Marched from Camden to Princeton, then to Warren, then to Monticello and back to Warren and then to Monticello. We are near Monticello now. /s/ E. T. HARRIS, 1st Lt. Comdg. Co."
- Company F – This company enlisted at Lake Village, Arkansas, on November 10, 1863, composed mostly of men from Chicot County, Arkansas. The following endorsement accompanied the muster roll: "This Company is composed of parts of several commands now East of the Mississippi river and of men that were subject to conscription West of the same. It was raised by James W. Bowie, and was organized and mustered into the service on the 10th day of November 1863, at which they and other Companies was formed into a battalion, Col. J. C. Wright Comdg, and now belong to Col. J. C. Wrights Reg't. Our duty has Principally been of an outpost nature, picketing, scouting, &c. Has been in no engagements up to this time. /s/ BELFIELD W. MATHIS."
- Company G – This company enlisted in Ashley County, Arkansas, on December 14, 1863, composed mostly of men from Ashley County, Arkansas. The following endorsement accompanied the muster roll: "Feb. 27, 1864, moved from Camp Lauther, Drew County, Arks, to Cut Off, Drew County, Arks. Men furnished for various scouts and important Picket Posts. /s/ CHARLES A. HARRIS, Capt. Comdg. Company G."
- Company H – This company enlisted in Ashley County, Arkansas, on December 19, 1863, composed mostly of men from Ashley County, Arkansas. The following endorsement accompanied the muster roll: "This Company is composed of paroled Soldiers, some who belong to commands east of the Mississippi river, and the remainder are those subject to conscription. Since the organization of the Company we have been engaged most of the time in Picketing, Scouting, &c. The Company marched from Ashley County, Arks, to Monticello and from there to this camp. /s/ J. R. SMITH, Capt. Comdg. Co."
- Company I – This company enlisted at Warren, Arkansas, on December 21, 1863, composed mostly of men from Saline County, Arkansas. The following endorsement accompanied the muster roll: "This Company has been engaged in scouting, picketing, &c. Made up with men coming from east of the Miss. River, some conscripts, some Paroled, &c. March from Saline County, Ark., to Monticello and thence to this place. /s/ L. F. JONES, Capt. Comdg."
- Company K – This company was organized in Arkansas County, Arkansas, on January 11, 1864, and enrolled in Confederate service at Camden, Arkansas, on January 14, 1864, composed mostly of men from Arkansas and Jefferson Counties, Arkansas. The following endorsement accompanied the muster roll: "This Company is composed of men from within the enemy's lines. There has never been an election for 2d lieutenant because my men were not all yet reported, but were left at home subject to my order. They have since been ordered to report. /s/ MOSES EMBREE, Capt. Comdg. Compy."

There is one extant muster roll for each company covering the period January 1–February 29, 1864, when the regiment was stationed at Cut Off, Drew County, Arkansas.

=== 12th Arkansas Cavalry Regiment ===
By mid-January, 1864, three additional companies had been attached to Wright's battalion, and, on February 15, 1864, the battalion was officially enrolled in Confederate service as the 12th (Wright's) Regiment Arkansas Cavalry. The regiment was assigned to Colonel William A. Crawford's Brigade of Brigadier-General James F. Fagan's Cavalry Division in Major-General Price's Cavalry Corps of the Confederate Army of the Trans-Mississippi Department. The other units assigned to the brigade were the 1st Arkansas Cavalry Regiment (Crawford's), Poe's Arkansas Cavalry Battalion and McMurtrey's Arkansas Cavalry Battalion.

== History ==
Wright's Cavalry was engaged in the battles associated with the Camden Expedition in the spring of 1864, particularly in the actions at Poison Spring and Marks' Mills. The regiment took part in Price's Raid in Missouri during the fall of 1864. During this operation, it engaged in the following battles:

- Price's Missouri Raid, Arkansas-Missouri-Kansas, September–October, 1864
  - Battle of Fort Davidson, Missouri, September 27, 1864
  - Fourth Battle of Boonville, Missouri, October 11, 1864
  - Battle of Glasgow, Missouri, October 15, 1864
  - Battle of Sedalia, Missouri, October 15, 1864
  - Second Battle of Lexington, Missouri, October 19, 1864
  - Battle of Little Blue River, Missouri, October 21, 1864
  - Second Battle of Independence, Missouri, October 21–22, 1864
  - Battle of Byram's Ford, Missouri, October 22–23, 1864
  - Battle of Westport, Missouri, October 23, 1864
  - Battle of Marais des Cygnes, Linn County, Kansas, October 25, 1864
  - Battle of Mine Creek, Missouri, October 25, 1864
  - Battle of Marmiton River, Missouri, October 25, 1864
  - Second Battle of Newtonia, Missouri, October 28, 1864

== Surrender ==
Returning to southwestern Arkansas in November, 1864, following Price's Raid, the regiment served in that area until the end of the war. The 12th Arkansas Cavalry Regiment was included in the general surrender of Confederate forces in the Trans-Mississippi Department on May 26, 1865.

== See also ==
- List of Confederate units from Arkansas
- Confederate Units by State
