= Beechcraft C-12 Huron =

Military staff and utility transport aircraft series of the King Air family

C-12 Huron
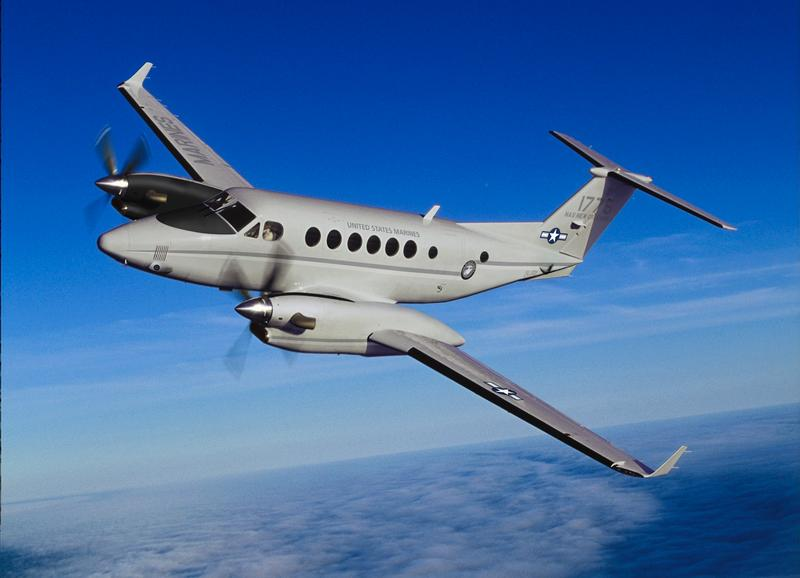
- A U.S. Marine Corps UC-12W

General information
- Type: Military utility aircraft
- Manufacturer: Beechcraft
- Status: Active service
- Primary users: United States Air Force United States Army; United States Marine Corps; United States Navy

History
- Manufactured: 1974–present
- Introduction date: 1974
- Developed from: Beechcraft Super King Air
- Variant: Beechcraft RC-12 Guardrail

The Beechcraft C-12 Huron is the military designation for a series of twin-engine turboprop aircraft based on the Beechcraft Super King Air and Beechcraft 1900. C-12 variants are used by the United States Air Force, Army, Navy and Marine Corps. These aircraft are used for embassy support and medical evacuation, as well as passenger and light cargo transport. Some aircraft are modified with surveillance systems for missions including the Cefly Lancer, Beechcraft RC-12 Guardrail and Project Liberty programs.

== Design and development ==
Originally designated U-25A, the first C-12A models entered service with the U.S. Army in 1974 and were used as a liaison and general personnel transport. The aircraft was essentially an "off-the-shelf" Super King Air 200, powered by the type's standard Pratt & Whitney Canada PT6A-41 engines.

The U.S. Navy followed suit in 1979, ordering a version of the Super King Air A200C (modified with a 1.32 m by 1.32 m; 52 inch by 52 inch cargo door from the Super King Air 200C), designating it the UC-12B, for logistics support between Naval and Marine Corps air stations, air facilities, and other activities, both in CONUS and overseas. The cabin can readily accommodate cargo, passengers or both. It is also equipped to accept litter patients in medical evacuation missions. Through 1982, the Navy ordered 64 of these aircraft.

A U.S. Air Force variant of the plane for surveillance roles primarily over Afghanistan and Iraq was the MC-12W Liberty. For that variant, Beechcraft built the basic plane and then sent it to Greenville, Texas where sophisticated intelligence, surveillance and reconnaissance (ISR) equipment was installed by L-3 Communications Missions Integration. As of 2013 the Liberty program had exceeded 300,000 combat flying hours. The MC-12W was rushed into combat as a supplemental surveillance and signals intelligence asset. Since its first combat mission on 10 June 2009, the aircraft flew 400,000 combat hours in 79,000 combat sorties, aiding in the kill or capture of "more than 8,000 terrorists" and uncovering 650 weapons caches. With its roles taken over by the growing MQ-9 Reaper fleet, the Air Force decided to divest itself of the 41 Liberty aircraft and turn them over to the U.S. Army and U.S. Special Operations Command, which was completed by October 2015. The Air Force's final MC-12W deployment in support of Operation Enduring Freedom ended on 13 October 2015.

=== TC-12B ===
The TC-12B Huron was a twin-engine, pressurized version of the Beechcraft Super King Air 200. Twenty-five served with the U.S. Navy with Training Squadron 35 (VT-35), the Navy's only TC-12B Huron squadron based at Naval Air Station Corpus Christi, Texas, home of the Training Air Wing 4 (TAW-4). The TC-12B was acquired to accommodate an increased multi-engine pilot training requirement when the USAF began sending C-130 track student pilots to the Navy for advanced training. Command of VT-35 alternated between a Navy Commander and a USAF Lt. Col and instructors of both services staffed the squadron. The Navy retired the TC-12B aircraft on 16 May 2017 after the USAF ceased sending student pilots eliminating the need for the TC-12B as the Navy's fleet of T-44C aircraft was sufficient to meet the USN, USMC and USCG multi engine pilot training need.

=== UC-12F/M ===
The UC-12F and UC-12M are light passenger and cargo airlift versions procured for the U.S. Navy and Marine Corps from 1986 and 1987 respectively. They are based on the Super King Air 200, use PT6A-42 engines, and have a maximum takeoff weight (MTOW) of 13,500 lb (6,100 kg). They are configured as combi aircraft and are also used for multi-engine training and testing.

=== C-12J ===
To meet the needs of transporting larger groups, the U.S. Army purchased six C-12J aircraft, based on the Beechcraft 1900C commuter airliner. One of the military C-12Js is used for GPS jamming tests at the 586th Flight Test Squadron, Holloman Air Force Base, New Mexico. Another is based at the 517th Airlift Squadron, Elmendorf Air Force Base, Alaska. Three were based at the 55th Airlift Flight, Osan Air Base, South Korea. They have been relocated to the 459th Airlift Squadron, Yokota Air Base, Japan. The remaining two are used by U.S. Army Aviation.

Although the UD- series 1900s were manufactured exclusively for military use, the United States military and other military and government organizations use 1900s from other series such as the UB-series 1900C, and 1900Ds which may be found elsewhere.

=== UC-12W ===
The UC-12W is an improved version of the UC-12F/M for the Marine Corps procured from 2010 for the same missions. It is based on the Super King Air 350, uses PT6A-60A engines, and has an MTOW of 16,500 lb (7,500 kg). According to its 2022 Marine Aviation Plan, United States Marine Corps Aviation plans to phase out the Model 200-based UC-12F and UC-12M along with the Cessna UC-35D and replace them with new UC-12Ws by 2032.

== Variants ==
=== King Air 200-based variants ===
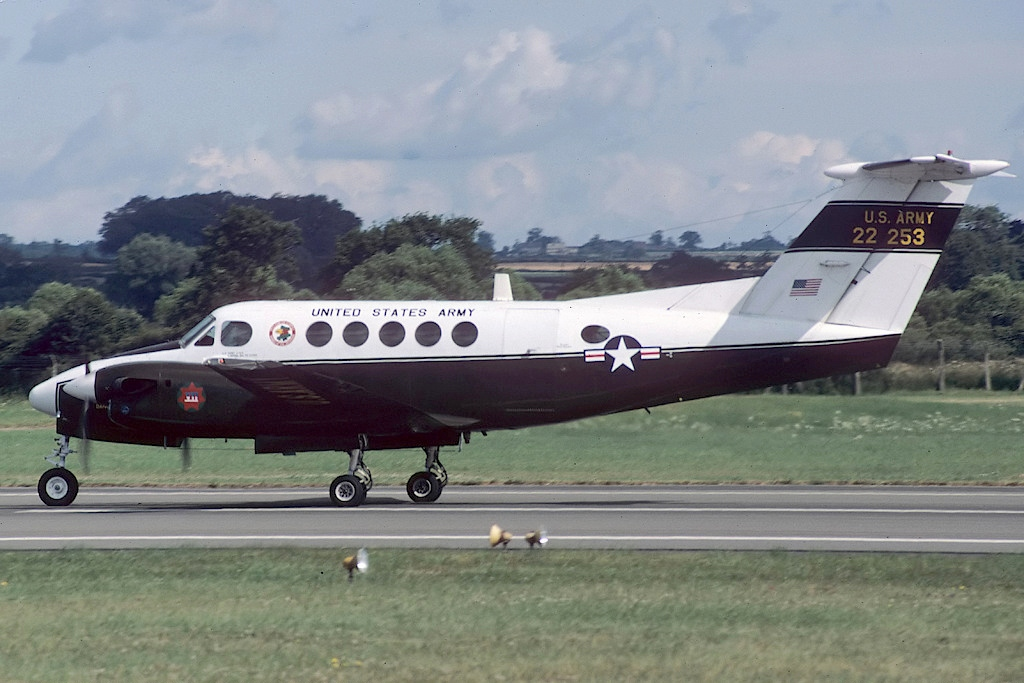
U.S. Army C-12A

C-12A
Used by the U.S. Army and U.S. Air Force for liaison and attache transport. Based on the King Air A200, with 750 shp (560 kW) PT6A-38 engines driving three-bladed propellers, and normally seating for eight passengers. 60 delivered to US Army and 30 to USAF, with one to Greek Air Force. Survivors later upgraded to C-12C standard.
UC-12B
U.S. Navy/U.S. Marine Corps version with an additional cargo door and powered by 850 shp (630 kW) PT6A-41 engines. Based on the King Air A200C. 66 built.
NC-12B
Conversion of UC-12B as testbed for sonobuoys, fitted with four sonobuoy launchers. One converted.
TC-12B
U.S. Navy training version developed by conversion of surplus UC-12B airframes. 20 converted.
C-12C
Based on C-12A but with 850 shp (630 kW) PT6A-41 engines. 14 new build aircraft for U.S. Army together with converted C-12As.
C-12D
U.S. Army and U.S. Air Force version. Based on the King Air A200CT, with 850 shp PT-6A-41 or PT-6A-42 engines. Changes include larger cargo door, "high-flotation" landing gear (a Beechcraft option for larger main landing gear wheels for use on unimproved runways) and provision for wingtip fuel tanks. Forty built for US Army and 6 for US Air Force.
RC-12D
Special mission, SIGINT aircraft for the U.S. Army, fitted with Guardrail V SIGINT system. 13 converted from C-12Ds, with one de-converted to C-12D standard
UC-12D
Based on the King Air A200CT (serial numbers BP-7 though BP-11).
C-12E
Proposed upgraded C-12A aircraft with PT-6A-42 engines for the USAF. Program cancelled with no aircraft converted.

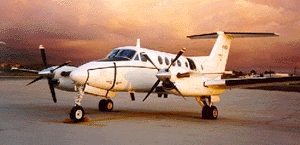
A USN C-12F

C-12F
Operational support aircraft for USAF and US Army, powered by PT6A-42 engines. Forty (later known as C-12F-3), based on King Air 200C with four-bladed propellers, leased from 1984 (and later purchased outright) by the USAF, with six more delivered to the Air National Guard. Twelve aircraft based on King Air A200CT and with three-bladed propellers were purchased by the US Army from 1985 (later known as C-12F-1), followed by another eight based on King Air 200C but with three-bladed propellers (later C-12F-2).
RC-12F
U.S. Navy version of the UC-12F modified with AN/APS-140/504 surface search radar. Two converted for range surveillance duties at the Pacific Missile Range Facility. Radar later removed and aircraft converted to operational support duties.
UC-12F
U.S. Navy version based on the King Air B200C, powered by PT6A-41s driving three-bladed propellers. Twelve operated from 1982. Cockpit upgraded to Proline 21.
RC-12G
U.S. Army version used for real-time tactical intelligence support under the Crazyhorse program. Based on C-12D, three built.
RC-12H
Special mission, battlefield SIGINT aircraft for the U.S. Army, based on C-12D and fitted with Guardrail/Common Sensor 3 (Minus) SIGINT system. Six built.
C-12L
Three A200s acquired for use in the Cefly Lancer program as RU-21Js; CEFLY is an acronym standing for Communications and Electronics Forward Looking Flying. In 1984 these were modified with new VIP interiors, returning to the U.S. Army as C-12Ls.
UC-12M
Support aircraft for U.S. Navy based in King Air B200C. Twelve built.
RC-12M
Conversion of UC-12M for range surveillance duties with AN/APS-140/504 surface search radar. Two converted.

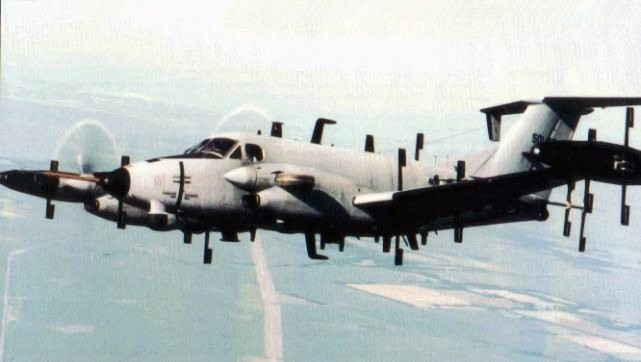
An RC-12N Guardrail Common Sensor aircraft

C-12R
Support aircraft for US Army based on King Air B200C, powered by 850 shp (630 kW) PT6A-42 engines driving 4-bladed propellers and with EFIS glass cockpit instrumentation. 29 built. Modifications for Global air-traffic management given designation C-12R-1.
C-12T
Upgrade of earlier U.S. Army C-12F versions with improved cockpit instrumentation.
C-12U
Upgrade of U.S. Army C-12T versions with improved cockpit instrumentation in order to meet global air traffic management directives.
C-12V
Upgraded C-12R with Proline 21 FMS

=== King Air 300-based variants ===
Medium Altitude Reconnaissance and Surveillance System (MARSS)
MULTI-INT ISR platform. The MARSS provides the commander with a multi-intelligence collection capability to accurately detect, identify, and report threat targets in near real-time. IMINT, COMINT and ELINT intercept capability. As of June 2010, 11 MARSS were created from outfitted Beechcraft King Air B-300 aircraft.

=== King Air 350-based variants ===
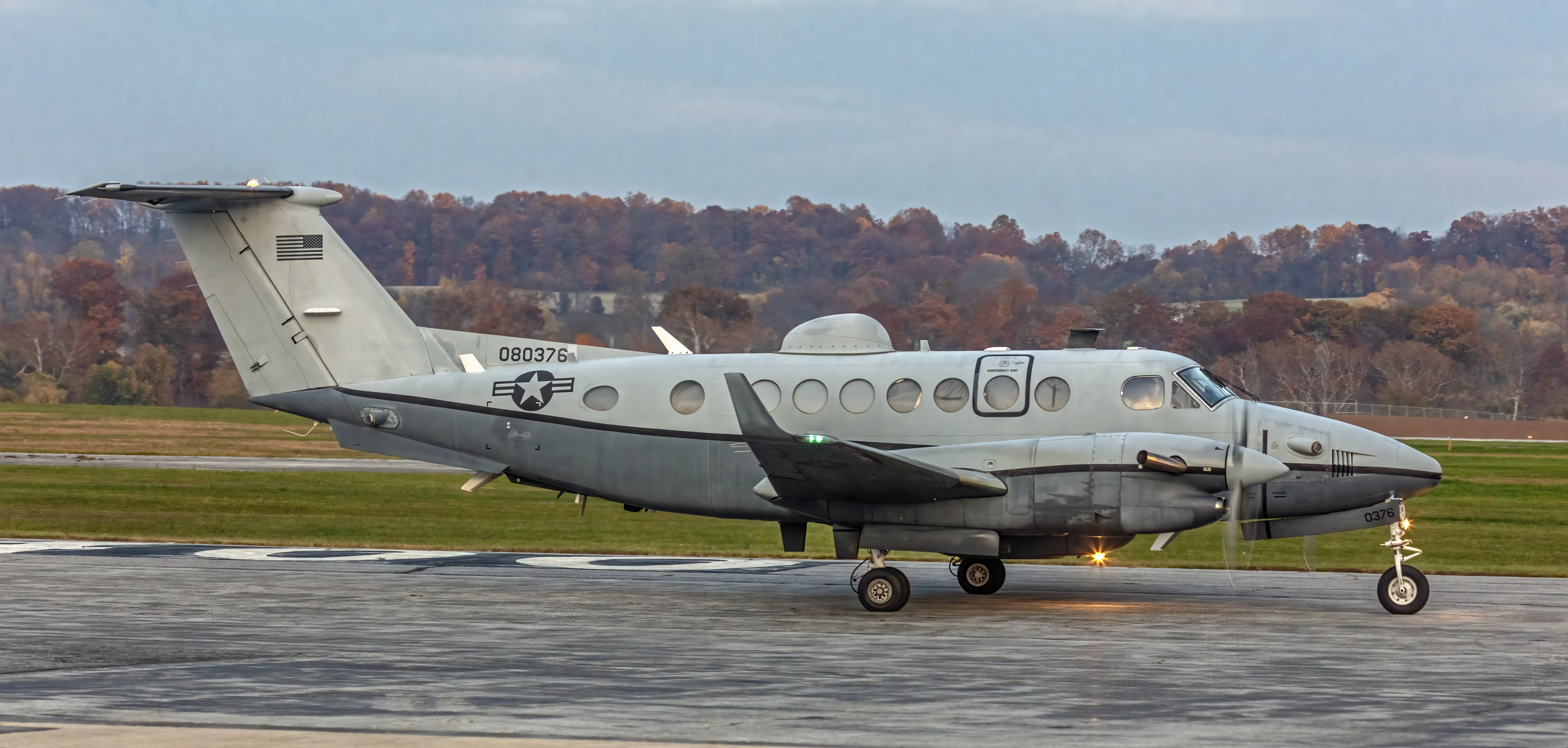
MC-12W Liberty

C-12S
U.S. Army version based on the King Air 350, with seating for 8 to 15 passengers and quick cargo conversion capability.
MC-12W
USAF version modified for the Intelligence, Surveillance & Reconnaissance (ISR) role; originally 8 King Air 350s and 29 King Air 350ERs and ending with 42 350ERs (including one combat loss). In service since June 2009 in Iraq and Afghanistan and globally for USSOCOM. All aircraft were transferred to USSOCOM, US Army, and other US government agencies by 2015. The last MC-12W Liberty under U.S. Air Force Special Operations Command was retired in September 2025. The Royal Canadian Air Force ordered 3 similar, if not exact, variants.
UC-12W
U.S. Marine Corps version based on the King Air 350.
MC-12S (EMARSS-S)
U.S. Army nomenclature for the modified MC-12W aircraft with EMARSS-S installed.

=== Beechcraft 1900-based variant ===
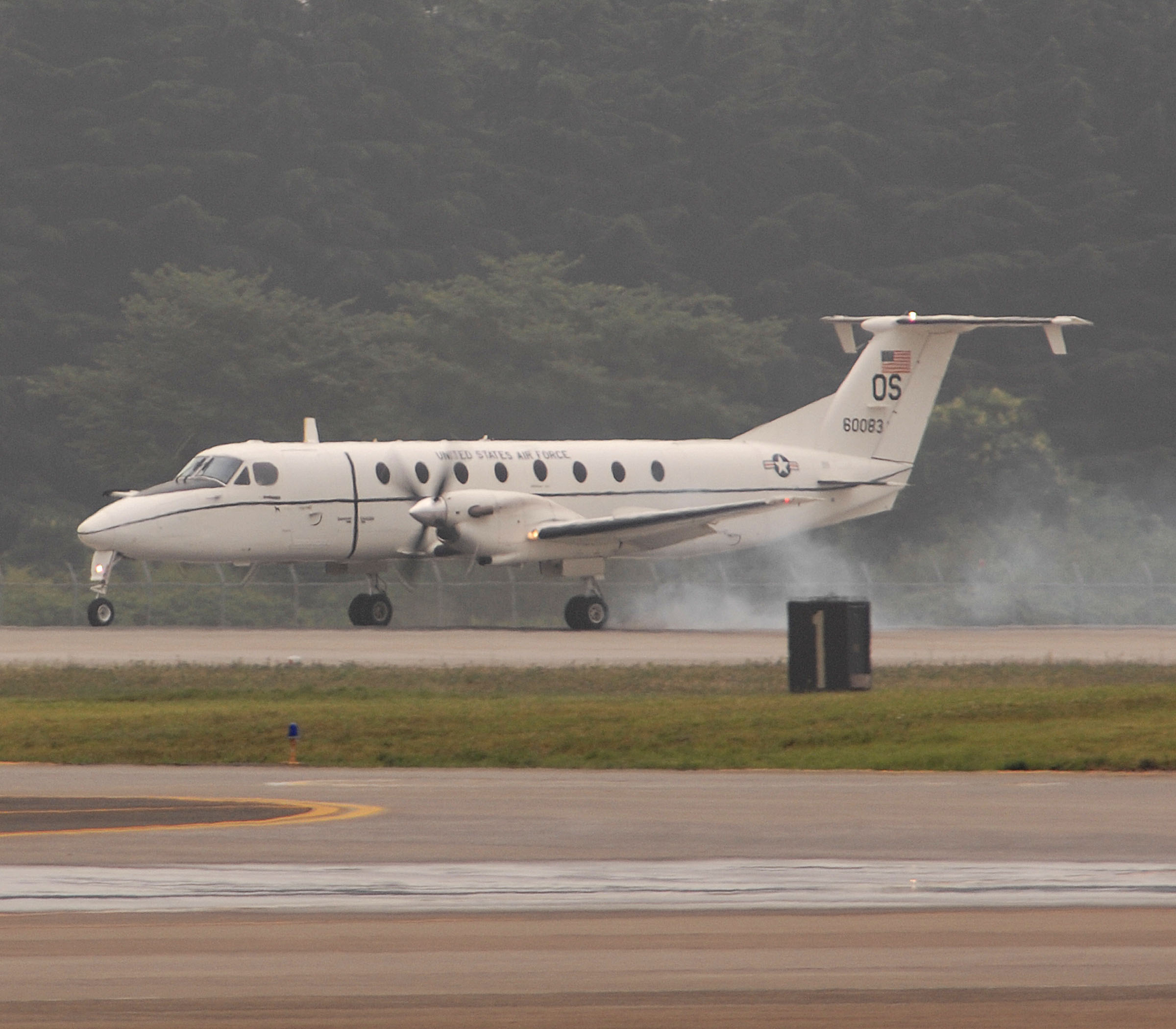
A U.S. Air Force Beech C-12J Huron lands at Yokota Air Base, Japan, on 29 June 2007.

C-12J
Used by the U.S. Air Force's Pacific Air Forces, and Air Force Materiel Command. It carries 2 crew and 19 passengers. The C-12J is based on the Beechcraft 1900C and carries the serials UD-1 through UD-6.

The Air Force currently operates only 4 C-12Js. 3 are operated by the 459th Airlift Squadron at Yokota Air Base, Japan and 1 by the Air Force Materiel Command from Holloman AFB, New Mexico. The Army has C-12Js in use.

=== Special military variants ===
The following RC-12 variants, although similar to earlier RC-12s based on the King Air 200, represent specially built airframes that combined upgraded engines (1,100 shp PT6A-67) and structural upgrades (swapping the traditional KA-200/300/350 T-Tail for the 1900 modified T-Tail to compensate for torque and aerodynamics and having reinforced spars to compensate for the increased maximum gross weight - up to as high as 16,500 lbs).

RC-12K
SIGINT aircraft for US Army based on King Air A200CT, with 1,200 shp (890 kW) PT-6A-67 engines driving four-bladed propellers and with increased (16,000 lb (7,260 kg) max take-off weight. Fitted with Guardrail/Common Sensor System 4 system. Nine built.
RC-12N
SIGINT aircraft for US Army based on King Air A200CT/C-12F airframe with 1,200 shp (890 kW) PT-6A-67 engines driving four-bladed propellers and 16,200 lb (7,350 kg) max take-off weight. Fitted with Guardrail/Common Sensor System 1 system. 15 C-12Fs converted to this standard.
RC-12P
SIGINT aircraft for US Army based on King Air A200CT/C-12F airframe with 1,200 shp (890 kW) PT-6A-67 engines driving four-bladed propellers and 16,200 lb (7,350 kg) max take-off weight. Fitted with Guardrail/Common Sensor System 2 system. 9 built.
RC-12Q
SIGINT aircraft for US Army, similar to RC-12P and with same Guardrail/Common Sensor System 2 sensors, but with satellite communications antenna in dorsal radome. Three built.
RC-12X, X+
Intelligence-gathering platform. 14 ordered, the first delivered to the U.S. Army in January 2011.

Note: The U.S. military also operates other King Air versions under other designations, including the C-6 Ute and T-44 series. In addition, there are a number of Beechcraft 1900s operated by the military under civilian registrations, using their civilian model designations.

== Operators ==
Argentina

- Fuerza Aerea Argentina
- Armada Argentina

Canada

- Royal Canadian Air Force to support Special Operations.

Greece

- Hellenic Army

Israel

- Israeli Air Force

Pakistan

- Pakistan Air Force

Philippines

- Philippine Navy

United States

- United States Air Force
- United States Army 116 Beech A200 King Air as of January 2025
- United States Marine Corps
- United States Navy
- NASA

== Specifications (Beechcraft C-12 Huron) ==
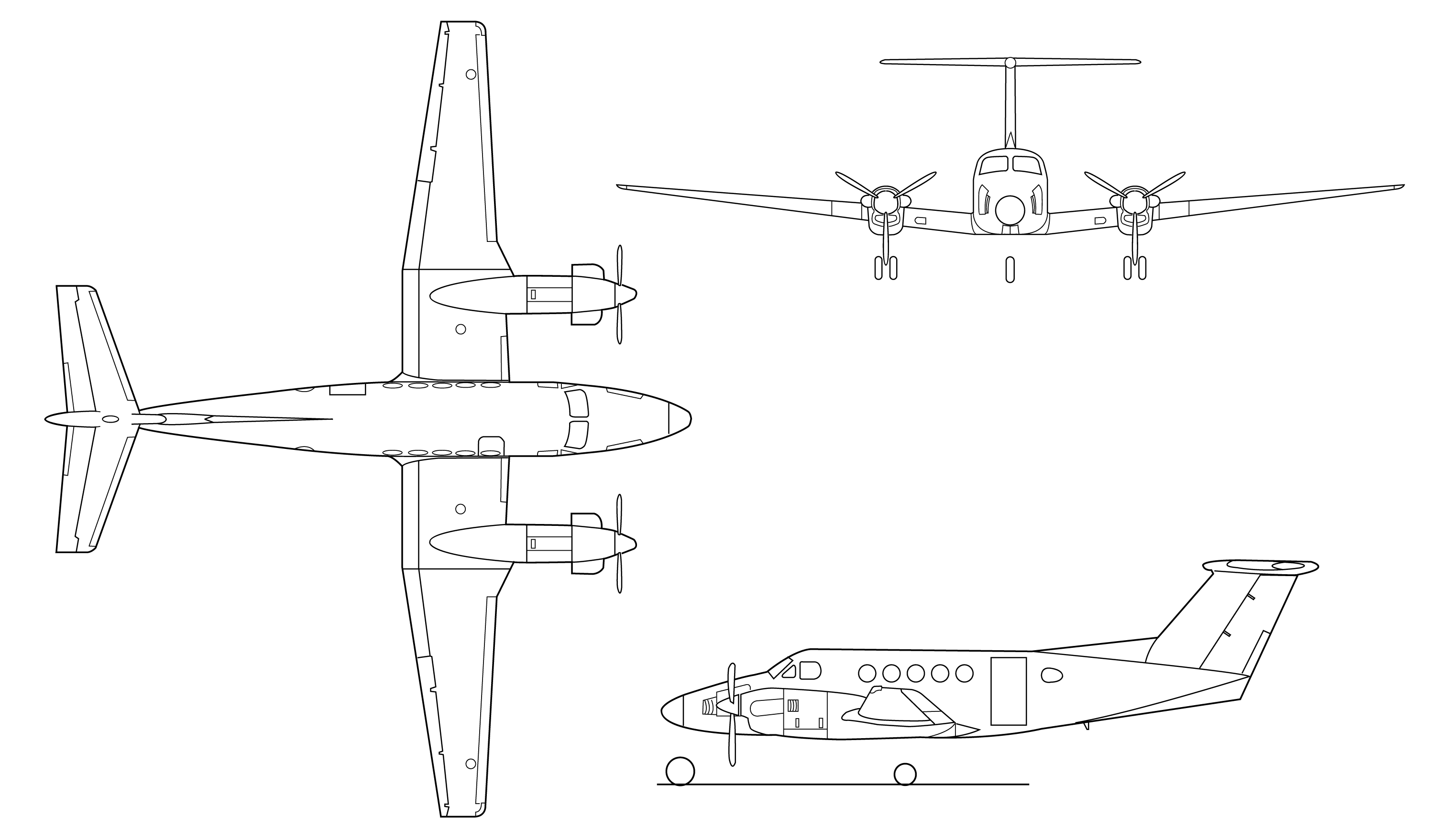
Orthographically projected diagram of the Beechcraft King Air B200.

Data from Jane's All the World's Aircraft 2005-2006

General characteristics

- Crew: 1–5
- Capacity: 13 passengers
- Length: 43 ft 9 in (13.34 m)
- Wingspan: 54 ft 6 in (16.61 m)
- Height: 15 ft (4.6 m)
- Wing area: 303 sq ft (28.1 m^{2})
- Airfoil: root: NACA 23018; tip: NACA 23012
- Empty weight: 7,755 lb (3,518 kg)
- Max takeoff weight: 12,500 lb (5,670 kg)
- Fuel capacity: 675.2 US gal (562.2 imp gal; 2,556 L) ; 1,035.2 US gal (862.0 imp gal; 3,919 L) with ferry tanks
- Powerplant: 2 × Pratt & Whitney Canada PT6A-42 turboprop engines, 850 shp (630 kW) each
- Propellers: 4-bladed constant-speed propellers

Performance

- Maximum speed: 289 kn (333 mph, 535 km/h) at 15,000 ft (4,572 m)
- Range: 1,450 nmi (1,670 mi, 2,690 km) C-12J
- Ferry range: 1,800 nmi (2,100 mi, 3,300 km) C-12J with maximum fuel and 45-minute reserve
- Service ceiling: 35,000 ft (11,000 m)
- Rate of climb: 2,450 ft/min (12.4 m/s)
- Wing loading: 41.3 lb/sq ft (202 kg/m^{2})
- Power/mass: 0.14 hp/lb (0.23 kW/kg)

== See also ==
Related development

- Beechcraft King Air
- Beechcraft Super King Air
- Beechcraft 1900

Aircraft of comparable role, configuration, and era

- Cessna 425
- Cessna 441
- Mitsubishi Mu-2
- Piper PA-31T Cheyenne
- Embraer EMB 121 Xingu
