= Aerial Common Sensor =

The Lockheed Martin Aerial Common Sensor (ACS) platform was a proposed reconnaissance aircraft airframe project for the United States Army (US Army) and United States Navy (US Navy). The aircraft would have been able to detect troop movements, intercept enemy communications and radar transmissions, and communicate with other aircraft. It would have had synthetic aperture radar, electro-optical and infrared detection instrumentation. The program was cancelled on January 12, 2006.

== Project proposals ==
The Army intended to acquire 34 units, with a further 19 going to the Navy. The initial contract, awarded on August 3, 2004, was valued at $79 million, but total contract value through 2010 would have been $879 million. Beyond that, the total program cost was to reach $7 billion, with only 20–30% going to the platform vendor. The ACS would have replaced three existing Army and Navy platforms—the de Havilland Canada RC-7 ARL, Beechcraft RC-12, Beechcraft RU-21 Guardrail, and Lockheed EP-3E Aries II. Testing was to begin in 2006, and full-rate production would have begun in 2009. While the US Army was fully committed, the US Navy did not and may instead opt for a modified version of the P-8 Poseidon.

The Lockheed Martin entry beat a consortium of Northrop Grumman and Gulfstream Aerospace, using the Gulfstream G450 platform. The competing entry attempted to play up nationalist sympathies, and give the impression of a security risk by using a Brazilian airframe, provided by EMBRAER, using their more affordable, reliable, and cost effective (the latter two being questioned) EMBRAER ERJ 145 platform — Gulfstream's airframe did have longer range and could fly at higher altitudes but the acquisition and operational costs (main requirements of DoD for ACS platform) of ERJ 145 were considered much more attractive. Both electronics packages were equivalent and had no major influence in this decision. It was later decided that the ERJ 145 would not suffice due to weight constraints, and thus, while Lockheed was to retain the system integrator role, the Army attempted to re-bid platform entry among several larger aircraft.

EMBRAER were to produce the first five airframes in Brazil (based upon the commercial ERJ 145), while final assembly on following units would have taken place in Jacksonville, Florida, to satisfy Department of Defense workshare requirements. Electronics integration was to be conducted by Lockheed Martin at an unannounced site.

== Criticism and cancellation ==
Lockheed has faced criticism from the United States Department of Defense (DoD), and specifically, the US Army, for not being able to properly forecast weight issues with the system. The Army claimed in an August 11, 2005 article in The Wall Street Journal that Lockheed could potentially lose the contract if they did not resolve the issue.

ACS was cancelled on January 12, 2006. The Department of Defense paid a contract termination fee of $200 million, nearly all of which was passed on to subcontractors such as Argon ST, Harris Corporation, and L-3 Communications. Most Lockheed Martin and Army personnel were reassigned to other projects.

On November 2, 2006 the US Army said it planned to revive the ACS program in 2009, and conducted an Industry Day in mid-October. Boeing also proposed a modified version of the Boeing P-8 Poseidon to fill the ACS role. The ACS project has since been superseded by EMARSS, based on a smaller aircraft.
