= Lucius D. Clay Kaserne =

U.S. Army airfield in Germany

- Flugplatz Wiesbaden-Erbenheim
- Part of U.S. Army Installation Management Command
- Wiesbaden-Erbenheim in Germany
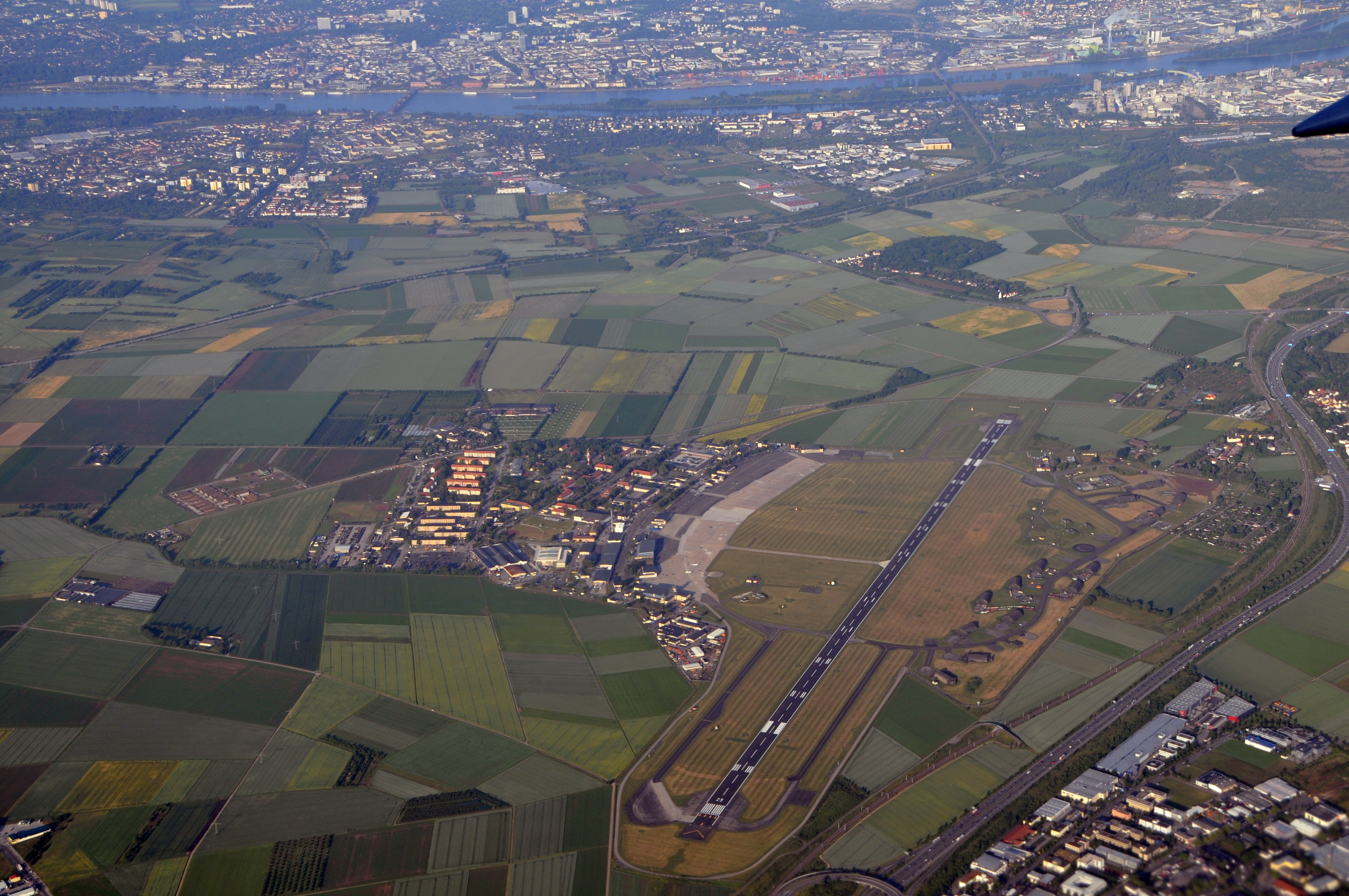
- 2009 aerial photo

Site information
- Controlled by: United States Army
- Open to the public: No
- Website: U.S. Army Garrison Wiesbaden

Location
- Location in Germany
- Coordinates: 50°02′58″N 08°19′28″E

Site history
- Built: 1929
- In use: 1929–present
- Battles/wars: World War II
- Events: Berlin Airlift

Garrison information
- Garrison: U.S. Army Garrison Wiesbaden
- Occupants: Headquarters, U.S. Army Europe; 2d Signal Brigade; 66th Military Intelligence Brigade

Airfield information
- Identifiers: IATA: WIE, ICAO: ETOU
- Elevation: 460 feet (140 m) AMSL
Runways
Direction	Length and surface
07/25	7,069 feet (2,155 m) paved
- Sources: DoD FLIP

The Lucius D. Clay Kaserne (German: Flugplatz Wiesbaden-Erbenheim) (IATA: WIE, ICAO: ETOU), commonly known as Clay Kaserne, formerly known as Wiesbaden Air Base and later as Wiesbaden Army Airfield, is an installation of the United States Army in Hesse, Germany. The kaserne is located within the boroughs Wiesbaden-Erbenheim and Wiesbaden-Delkenheim. Named for General Lucius D. Clay, it is the home of the Army's 2d Theater Signal Brigade, 66th Military Intelligence Brigade and is the headquarters of the U.S. Army Europe and Africa (USAREUR-AF).

USAREUR-AF oversees V Corps, Security Assistance Group-Ukraine, the 7th Army Training Command, 10th Army Air & Missile Defense Command and 21st Theater Sustainment Command. Clay Kaserne also maintains an airfield, facilitated by 1-214th Aviation.

== History ==
=== Origins ===
The land on which present-day Clay Kaserne now stands was originally built in 1910 as a race track for horses. In 1929, the race track was converted into a regional airport. The Luftwaffe took over operations in 1936. One unit stationed at the airfield was Jagdgruppe 50, a fighter group of Messerschmitt Bf 109s.

=== World War II ===
On August 17, 1943, Jagdgruppe 50 intercepted American bombers taking part in the ill-fated Regensburg Strike targeting the Messerschmitt factory in Regensburg and the ball bearing plants in Schweinfurt. Alfred Grislawski, a German fighter ace, took part. The field was captured when the 80th U.S. Infantry Division took Wiesbaden on 28 March 1945. Subsequently, the United States Army Air Forces gave the base the temporary designation "Y-80."

=== Cold War ===
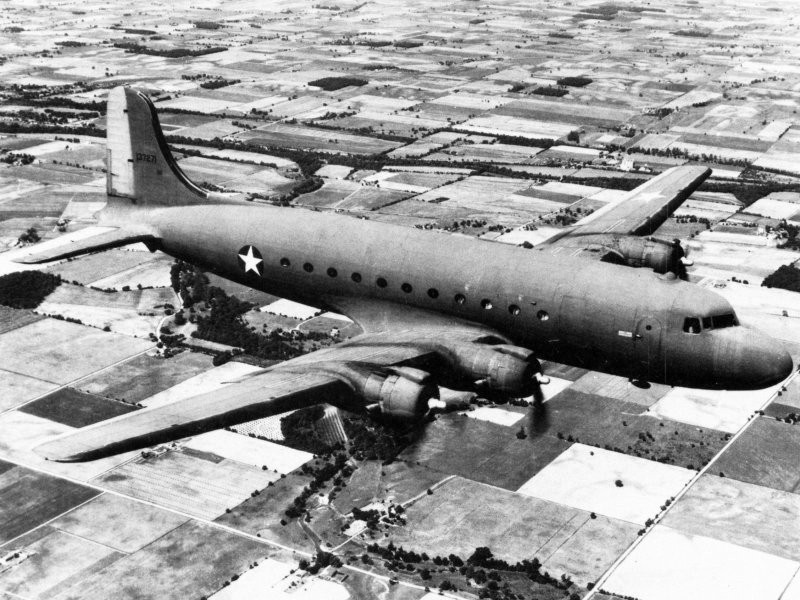
A C-54 Skymaster

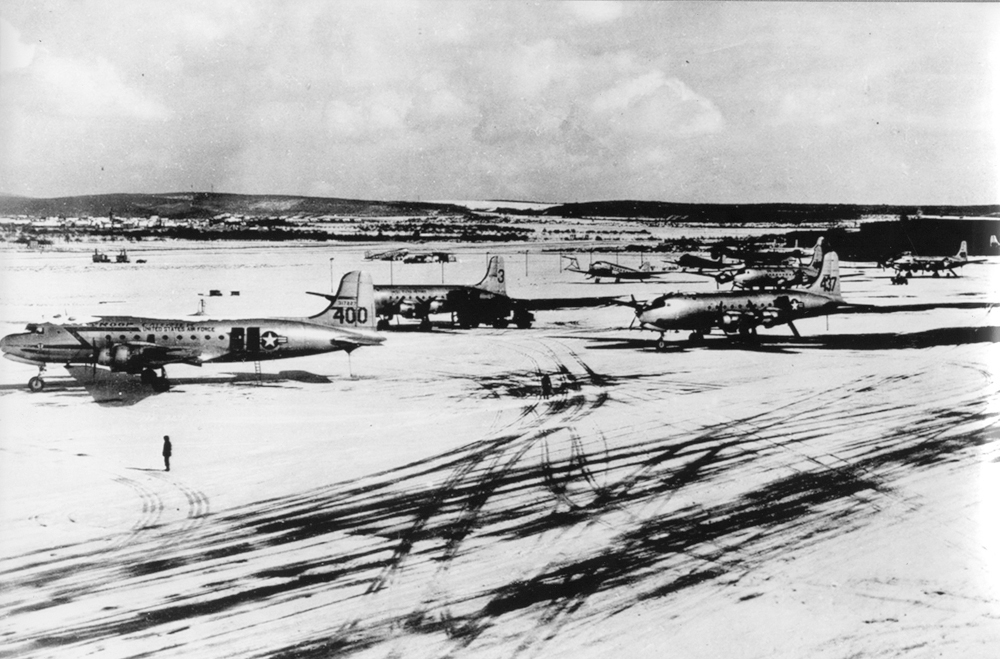
C-54s stand out against the snow at Wiesbaden Air Base during the Berlin Airlift in the Winter of 1948–49

Beginning in September, 1945, the European Air Transport Service (EATS) operated passenger and cargo service from Wiesbaden daily to London, Munich, Bremen, Vienna and Berlin. From Berlin an EATS plane made weekly flights to Warsaw, Poland. Flights originated from Vienna for Bucharest, Belgrade, Sofia, and Budapest. In the Mediterranean area EATS flights connected Udine, Pisa, Rome, and Naples.

The EATS originally was composed of left-over wartime troop carrier squadrons, glider and fighter pilots, B-17 "Flying Fortress" crewmen and other available personnel. In addition to regular flights which service the Army of Occupation, EATS also operated special flights such as providing transportation for diplomatic officials, evacuating sick or wounded, performing mercy flights, aiding Graves Registration in returning the remains of American soldiers and rushing supplies to needy areas.

In 1948 the installation served as a hub supporting the Berlin Airlift with around-the-clock flights to Tempelhof Airport. Airmen from Wiesbaden distinguished themselves in support of "Operation Vittles". C-47 "Skytrain"s and C-54 "Skymasters" of the 60th Troop Carrier Group flew missions daily to Tempelhof in the beleaguered city of Berlin. During one day's operations more than 80 tons of food and supplies were airlifted from Wiesbaden.

The streets on Wiesbaden Air Base were named after servicemen who gave their lives during the Airlift. On 4 July 1956 a U-2A stationed in Wiesbaden flew over both Moscow and Leningrad as part of Operation Overflight, missions to spy on Soviet Armed Forces bases. This was the first flight by a U-2 over the Soviet Union. It was flown by United States Air Force pilot Hervey Stockman, and the aircraft is now in the National Air and Space Museum in Washington, D.C.

In 1973, the headquarters of the U.S. Air Forces in Europe (USAFE) was relocated to Ramstein Air Base near Kaiserslautern. The Air Force moved most personnel out of Wiesbaden in 1975 as part of Operation Creek Swap, in which most Army facilities in Kaiserslautern were turned over to the Air Force, in exchange for the facilities at Wiesbaden. The 4th Brigade, 4th Infantry Division, was stationed at Wiesbaden in 1976 as part of "Brigade 76." The 4th Brigade was part of the 8th Infantry Division and stationed added combat power east of the Rhine River. Extensive work to convert the Air Force base to Army use was predominantly by the 94th Engineer Battalion, 24th Engineer Group. The 4th Brigade was replaced by the 3d Corps Support Command and 12th Aviation Brigade in the mid-1980s.

In the mid-1980s, the base served as a landing point for the F-117 "Nighthawk" "Stealth Fighter". Although not officially acknowledged by the Air Force until 1988, the F-117 became operational in 1983. The Wiesbaden Air Base would "go dark", turning off all airfield and perimeter lights, whenever "stealth" flights were landing or taking off. From 1975 to 1993, the air base was a joint Army/Air Force community.

U.S. Army Air Forces (USAAF)/U.S. Air Forces in Europe units (USAFE) assigned to Wiesbaden Air Base or Lindsey Air Station from 1945 to 1993 included:

- 363d Reconnaissance Group May – August 1945
- 51st Troop Carrier Group September 1945 – August 1948
- 317th Troop Carrier Group 30 September – 15 December 1948
- 7150th Air Force Composite Wing 15 December 1948– 1 October 1949
- 60th Troop Carrier Wing 1 October 1949 – 2 June 1951
- 18th Weather Squadron Headquarters 1949 – 1957
- 7110th Support Wing 2 June 1951 – 1 December 1957
- 7030th Support Wing 1 December 1957 – 15 November 1959
- 7100th Support Wing 15 November 1959 – 15 April 1985
- 7100th Air Base Group 15 April 1985 – 1 June 1993
- 1602d Air Transport Wing, 1 Jun 1948-30 May 1964 (MATS)

== Installation at Garlstedt, near Bremen, from 1978 ==
Lucius D. Clay Kaserne was a new military facility built near the village of Garlstedt just north of the city of Bremen. The facilities cost nearly $140 million to construct, half of which was paid for by the Federal Republic of Germany. The 2nd Armored Division (Forward) stationed there had approximately 3,500 soldiers and another approximately 2,500 family dependents and civilian employees. The West German government constructed family housing in the nearby city of Osterholz-Scharmbeck.

In addition to troop barracks, motor pools, an indoor firing range, repair and logistics facilities, and a local training area, facilities at Garlstedt included a troop medical clinic, post exchange, library, movie theater, and a combined officer/non-commissioned officer/enlisted club. The division's soldiers and family members received radio and TV broadcasts from The American Forces Network (AFN) – Europe via the AFN Bremerhaven affiliate station located in the nearby port city of Bremerhaven.

The brigade was officially designated as 2nd Armored Division (Forward) during ceremonies at Grafenwöhr, FRG on 25 July 1978. The Garlstedt facilities were officially turned over to the United States by the German government in October. At that time the Garlstedt kaserne (camp) was named after General Lucius D. Clay, the American military commander during the Allied occupation of Germany after World War II. His son, a retired U.S. Army major general, attended the ceremony.

The brigadier general in charge of 2nd Armored Division (Forward) had a unique command. In addition to command of the heavy brigade, he also functioned as the Commander, III Corps (Forward), headquartered in Maastricht, Netherlands, and as commander of all US Army forces in Northern Germany, including the military communities of Garlstedt and Bremerhaven. In the event of the deployment of III Corps and/or the 2nd Armored Division from the United States, the division commander would revert to his job as assistant division commander for operations of 2nd Armored Division. This contingency was practised during REFORGER exercises in 1980 and 1987. As a result of this varied and demanding job, command of the 2nd Armored Division (Forward) was considered a plum assignment for armor branch brigadier generals, on par with perhaps only the Berlin Brigade for high visibility and potential for advancement to higher rank.

The brigade initially deployed to Germany with the M60 Patton tank and the M113 armored personnel carrier. 4–3rd Field Artillery had the M109 155 mm self-propelled howitzer. In 1984, 2–66th AR transitioned to the M1 Abrams main battle tank. In 1985, 3–41st IN and 4–41st IN transitioned to the M2 Bradley Fighting Vehicle. The C/2-1 Cavalry was replaced by an air cavalry troop, the D/2-1 Cavalry, armed with AH-1S Cobra attack helicopters.

The brigade's initial subordinate combat units consisted of the 3rd Battalion of the 41st Infantry Regiment, 2nd Battalion of the 50th Infantry Regiment, 2nd Battalion, 66th Armored Regiment (Iron Knights), 1st Battalion, 14th Field Artillery Regiment, and C Troop, 2nd Squadron, 1st Cavalry Regiment.

In October 1983, as part of the army's regimental alignment program, 2–50 Infantry was redesignated as 4–41 Infantry and 1–14 Field Artillery as 4–3 Field Artillery. Other brigade subordinate units eventually included the 498th Support Battalion, D Company, 17th Engineer Battalion, and the 588th Military Intelligence Company. The brigade also had a military police platoon and an aviation detachment.

In 1986, under the army's COHORT unit manning and retention plan, 3–41st Infantry returned to Fort Hood, Texas, and was replaced by 1–41st Infantry. In 1987, 4–41st Infantry returned to Fort Hood and was replaced by 3–66th Armor (Burt's Knights, named for Captain James M. Burt who was awarded the Medal of Honor as a company commander in the 66th Armored Regiment in the Battle of Aachen during World War II). Now an armor-heavy brigade, 2nd Armored Division (Forward) fielded 116 M-1A1 Abrams tanks and nearly 70 M2/3 Bradley Fighting Vehicles.

The division participated in numerous major NATO training exercises, including "Trutzige Sachsen" (1985), "Crossed Swords" (1986) and the "Return of Forces to Germany" (REFORGER) (1980 and 1987). Division subordinate units used the NATO gunnery and maneuver ranges at the Bergen-Hohne Training Area for gunnery and maneuver training and each year the division as a whole deployed south to Grafenwöhr and Hohenfels[24] (both in Bavaria) training areas for annual crew and unit gunnery and maneuver qualification.

The division had a formal partnership with Panzergrenadierbrigade 32, a Federal Republic of Germany Bundeswehr mechanized infantry brigade headquartered in nearby Schwanewede. The division also had informal relationships with Dutch, Belgian, and British NORTHAG forces, often conducting joint training activities at Bergen Hohne.

After the Gulf War the division went through a series of inactivations and redesignations. Due to the restructuring of the U.S. Army after the end of the Cold War, the 2nd Armoured division was ordered off the active duty rolls, ending more than 50 years of continuous service. SGT Michael L. Anderson was the last member of the 2nd Armored Division. He was a 74F who was in charge of cutting orders for all remaining members of 2nd Armored Division HQ. On 1 September 1991, he cut the final orders for himself and his commanding officer.

Over the summer and fall of 1992, the 2nd Armored Division was inactivated. Lucius D. Clay Kaserne was turned back over to the German government and was later to become home of the German Army Logistics and Supply School (Logistikschule der Bundeswehr) as well as the seat of General der Nachschubtruppe.

Lucius D. Clay's name was later reused for the Wiesbaden Army Airfield.

=== 21st century ===
Until summer 2011, WAAF was home to the headquarters of 1st Armored Division and a number of subordinate units. As American forces draw down in Europe, 2017 plans called for Wiesbaden to remain one of six geographic hubs for U.S. forces in Europe. After the closure of US facilities in Frankfurt, the headquarters of American Forces Network (AFN) was moved from its old AFN Frankfurt location to Mannheim. AFN opened a small regional studio, AFN Hessen, on WAAF to serve the American troops in and around Wiesbaden. It is now home to the 2nd Military Intelligence Battalion of the 66th Military Intelligence Brigade, flying the RC-12 Guardrail signals intelligence aircraft.

On June 14, 2012, WAAF was renamed "Lucius D. Clay Kaserne" after General Lucius D. Clay. Clay was the former U.S. military governor of the Germany and architect of the rebuilding of Germany after World War II that led to the Marshall Plan. Clay instituted Operation Vittles from WAAF in 1948, retiring only after the Soviets lifted their blockade of Berlin. Prior to this renaming, "Lucius D. Clay Kaserne" was the name of a U.S. Army facility in then-West Germany, near the community of Garlstedt in Osterholz-Scharmbeck. The installation still named Clay Kaserne had been the home of the 2nd Armored Division (Forward) and is now the home of the Bundeswehr's logistics school.

In 2022 and 2023, during the Russo-Ukrainian War from 2022, the base became the logistical hub, the International Donor Coordination Center, involving at least 17 nations who had representatives there.

The Clay Barracks were the central location for the secret US support for Ukraine in the war against Russia. A New York Times article in March 2025 revealed that the US had planned and directed military operations for attacks on Russian territory from there, and provided the target coordinates for these operations. Key figures such as General Christopher Donahue and Mykhailo Zabrodskyi laid the foundation for the cooperation. This made the US government advisors an important part of the Ukrainian defense against Russia’s unprovoked full-scale invasion of Ukraine. According to US sources, more than 700,000 Russian soldiers have been killed or wounded in Ukraine’s defense of its territory during the Russo-Ukrainian war.

== Lindsey Air Station ==
Lindsey Air Station, an installation on the opposite side of Wiesbaden from the air base, was established as an Army Air Force installation on 13 November 1946, having previously been a German Army facility named Gersdorff Kaserne. Lindsey Air Station achieved its greatest prominence between December 1953 and 14 March 1973 when it was the host base for Headquarters, USAFE.

After the transfer of Wiesbaden Air Base to the Army in 1976, Lindsey Air Station provided support for various Air Force units in the Wiesbaden area until it was returned in 1993 to the Federal Republic of Germany and renamed Europaviertel. The buildings at Lindsey Air Station now house certain offices of the German Federal Investigation Bureau Bundeskriminalamt (BKA), the State Police of Hesse, new private housing and a folk high school (VHS). The sports field and gym are now the home of the Wiesbaden Phantoms.

== See also ==
- List of airports by IATA code: W
- List of United States Army installations in Germany
