= 2nd Military Intelligence Battalion =

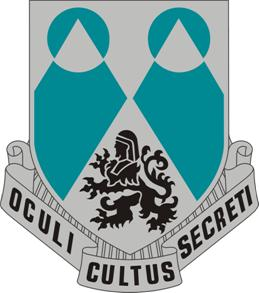
- Battalion coat of arms
- Active: 1961–1992; 2001–present
- Country: United States
- Branch: United States Army
- Type: Battalion
- Role: Military intelligence
- Part of: 66th Military Intelligence Brigade
- Garrison/HQ: Wiesbaden Army Airfield
- Mottos: Oculi Cultus Secreti (The Eyes of Intelligence)
- Equipment: RC-12 Guardrail
- Engagements: Operation Desert Storm

Commanders
- Current commander: LTC Thomas Burney

Insignia
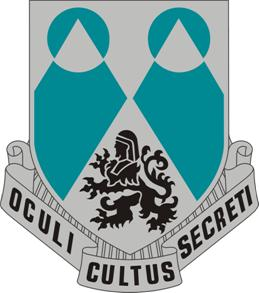
- Distinctive Unit Insignia

The 2nd Military Intelligence Battalion is a unit of the United States Army that specializes in the acquisition of signals information in direct support of the 66th Military Intelligence Brigade. The 2nd MI Battalion is currently headquartered at Wiesbaden Army Airfield in Germany.

== History ==
The battalion was constituted on 18 October 1961 in the Regular Army as the 2nd Air Reconnaissance Support Battalion and activated in Germany on 15 November 1961. On 16 September 1962, the battalion was converted and redesignated as the 2nd Military Intelligence (MI) Battalion. Its official designation was the 2nd MI Battalion (Aerial Reconnaissance Support) (Field Army), but it was referred to unofficially as the 2nd MIBARS.

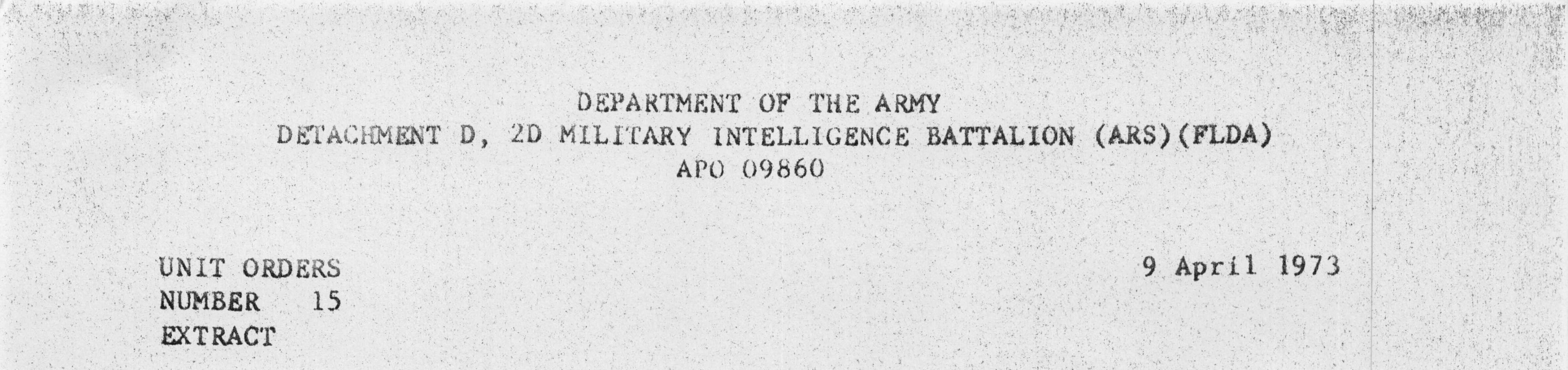
The header portion of a 2nd MI Battalion unit order from 1973 with the battalion's official designation.

=== 2nd MIBARS ===
The 2nd MIBARS’ primary mission was to analyze imagery acquired by US Air Force Tactical Reconnaissance Squadrons (TRS) in support of US Army requirements. The battalion’s subordination to Field Army headquarters allowed it to support any unit within the Field Army structure rather than a specific corps or division. Its most distinguished alums was LTC Sidney T. Weinstein, who commanded the battalion in the early 1970s before rising to the rank of Lieutenant General and serving as the Army’s Deputy Chief of Staff for Intelligence.

The 2nd MIBARS consisted of a headquarters and headquarters company (HHC), a delivery platoon, and four imagery exploitation detachments (A through D). The HHC was in Kaiserslautern, Germany, until 1976 or 1977, when it moved to Pirmasens.

The delivery platoon was equipped with Beechcraft U-21 Ute aircraft, allowing the battalion to deliver products quickly and transport personnel between locations when necessary. It was based at Sembach Air Base near Kaiserslautern and was deactivated in 1979 or 1980.

Detachments B, C, and D were co-located with USAF tactical reconnaissance units. Detachment B was with the 38th TRS at Ramstein Air Force Base (AFB) until 1973, when the detachment followed the squadron to Zweibrucken AFB; Detachment C was with the 10th Tactical Reconnaissance Wing (TRW) at RAF Alconbury in England; and Detachment D was with the 17th TRS at RAF Upper Heyford in England until January 1970, when the detachment moved with the squadron to Zweibrucken AFB.

Detachment A, which was co-located with the 497th Reconnaissance Technical Group at Schierstein Barracks in Wiesbaden, was unique in that it did not exploit tactical imagery but instead exploited classified national-level imagery and imagery of Soviet and East German forces collected over the Berlin air corridors.

=== 2nd MI Battalion (AE) ===
In 1977, the army initiated a study to identify, justify, and prioritize the need for new capabilities, equipment, or systems within the 2nd MIBARS. The study resulted in a complete makeover of the battalion and its official redesignation as the 2nd MI Battalion (Aerial Exploitation) in May 1979.

As a result of the reorganization, the original 2nd MIBARS detachments were redesignated as platoons (A through D) and were consolidated into a single company known as the Combat Intelligence Company (CBTI) (Imagery Interpretation). Their missions and locations did not change.

Two additional companies were assigned to the battalion, providing it with additional reconnaissance and surveillance capabilities. The first was the 330th Army Security Agency (ASA) Company, which it acquired from the 502d ASA Group on 1 July 1977. The 330th flew RU-21 aircraft equipped with the Guardrail V system, providing the battalion with a communications intelligence (COMINT) capability.

The other company reassigned to the 2nd MI BN (AE) was the 73rd MI Company (Aerial Surveillance), which it acquired from the 11th Aviation Group on 1 January 1978. This company was equipped with OV-1D and RV-1D Mohawk aircraft, providing the battalion with indigenous assets to conduct electronic intelligence (ELINT) collection and aerial surveillance along the Warsaw Pact border.

The primary factor behind the battalion’s reorganization was a new Army doctrine that called for placing assets like the RU-21 Guardrail V, OV-1D, and RV-1D aircraft into units directly attached to the higher headquarters they supported. Theoretically, this would provide each of the two Army Corps (V and VII) in Europe with its own aerial exploitation battalion. However, because there were only enough aircraft and equipment to form one AE battalion, the 2nd MI BN (AE) was assigned to INSCOM/USAREUR so it could support both Corps. On 16 October 1983, after enough aircraft and personnel had arrived in the theater to field another AE battalion, the 2nd MI BN (AE) was transferred to VII Corps, while the newly constituted battalion—designated the 1st MI BN (AE)—was assigned to V Corps.

Ironically, the CBTI company containing the original 2nd MIBARS units did not fit the battalion’s new mission profile, so, on 1 October 1982, it was reassigned to the 66th MI Group. The company’s platoons were again redesignated, becoming the 581st (Zweibrucken), 582nd (Alconbury), and 583rd (Wiesbaden) MI Detachments, and were subordinated to the 502nd ASA Battalion.

=== Deactivation and Reactivation ===
The 2nd MI BN (AE) was deactivated in Germany on 15 November 1991 or 15 August 1992. It was reactivated again on 26 January 2001 in Darmstadt, Germany, where it was redesignated and reorganized under the 66th MI Brigade as the 2nd MI BN. It relocated to Wiesbaden, Germany, in November 2008, where its current mission is analyzing and exploiting signals intelligence.

=== Fate of the Original 2nd MIBARS Units ===
The 2nd MIBARS’ original detachments continued to undergo change and re-subordination in the years following their reassignment to the 502nd ASA Battalion. By 1988, these detachments had been reorganized once again into a battalion designated the Imagery and Analysis Battalion (Provisional) under the 66th Military Intelligence Brigade. That battalion was headquartered at Schierstein Compound in Wiesbaden until June 1992, when it was absorbed into the 527th MI Battalion during yet another restructuring of the 66th MI Brigade.

At that point, it is difficult to determine the fate of the original 2nd MIBARS units. All of the original USAF units they supported had been inactivated by July 1992, so their original mission no longer existed. (Note: The 17th TRS at Zweibrucken was inactivated in January 1979; the 1st/21st TRS (the last reconnaissance element of the 10th TRW) at RAF Alconbury was inactivated in January 1988; the 38th TRS at Zweibrucken was inactivated in April 1991; and the 497th Reconnaissance Technical Group was inactivated on 1 July 1992.) In any event, if any remaining 2nd MIBARS elements existed after 1992, they would have ceased to exist by August 1994, when the 527th MI Battalion inactivated its remaining imagery company.

== Coat of arms ==
The coat of arms is a shield: Per chevron abased azure and argent, a chief dancetty of two enhanced of the last the apexes surmounted by two rounders of the first counterchanged and in base a sphinx rampant sable armed gules.

The motto is Oculi Cultus Secreti ("The Eyes of The Secret Cult"). The colors of white and teal blue symbolize the battalion's former status as an unassigned-to-branch unit. The battalion's numerical designation and mission are suggested by the two rounders or lenses directing their gaze downward. The sphinx is representative of the intelligence mission. Black alludes to the coat of arms of the old Rhineland district of Pfalz in Germany, where the unit was activated.

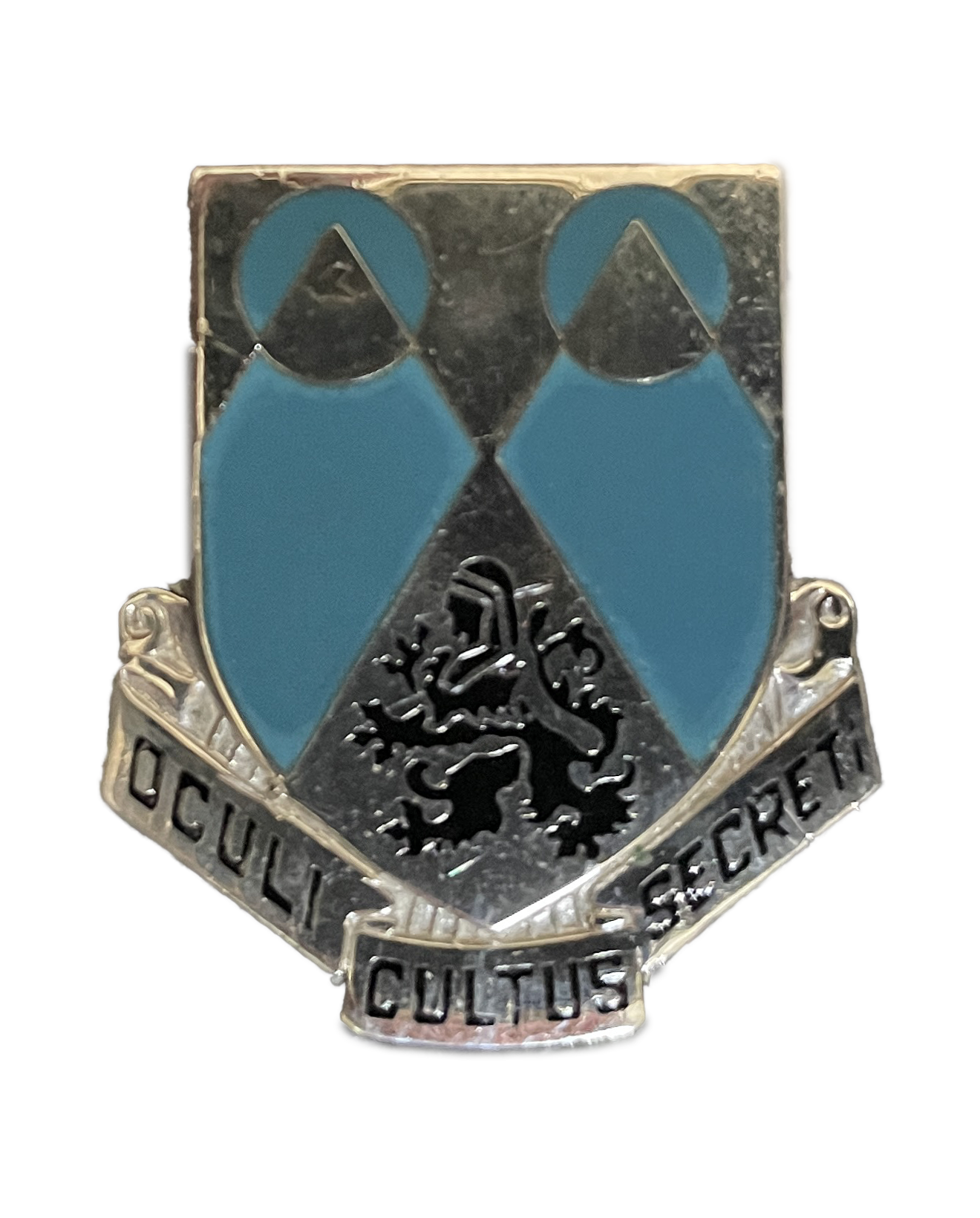
A slightly faded blue 2nd MI Battalion Unit Crest from the early 1970s.

The two rounders or lenses resemble a stereoscope and were almost certainly inspired by the unit’s original imagery support mission. Also, the original 2nd MIBARS crest was white and blue rather than white and teal blue. When and why the color was changed is unknown, but it may have occurred when the unit was reactivated in a SIGINT role.

== Military campaigns ==
The 2nd MI Battalion participated in the defense of Saudi Arabia, the liberation and defense of Kuwait, and the cease-fire campaigns during the Gulf War. It was decorated with a Meritorious Unit Commendation (Army) and a Streamer embroidered "Southwest Asia."
