= 66th Military Intelligence Brigade =

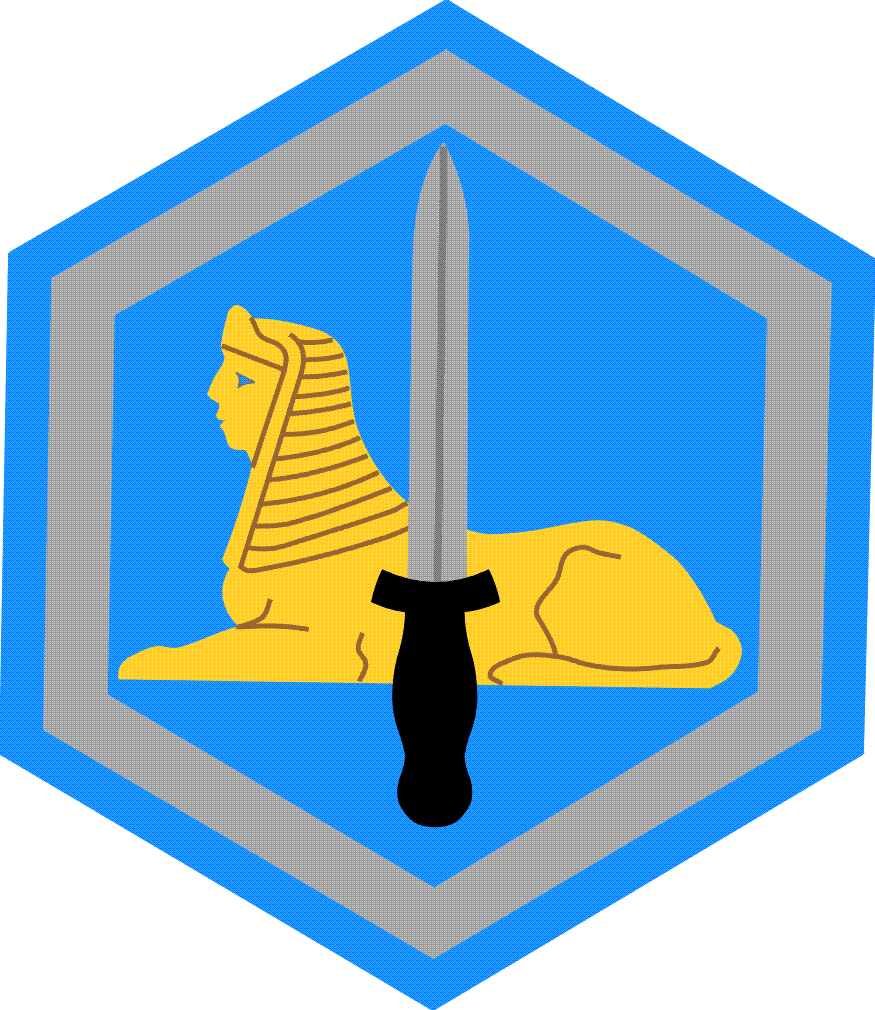
- 66th MIB shoulder sleeve insignia
- Active: 1986–1995; 2008–present
- Country: United States
- Branch: United States Army
- Part of: ADCON: United States Army Intelligence and Security Command; OPCON: United States Army Europe
- Installation: Clay Kaserne, Germany
- Motto: Power Forward
- Battle honours: World War II: Northern France
- Website: 66th Military Intelligence Brigade

Commanders
- Current commander: COL Steven J. Curtis

Insignia
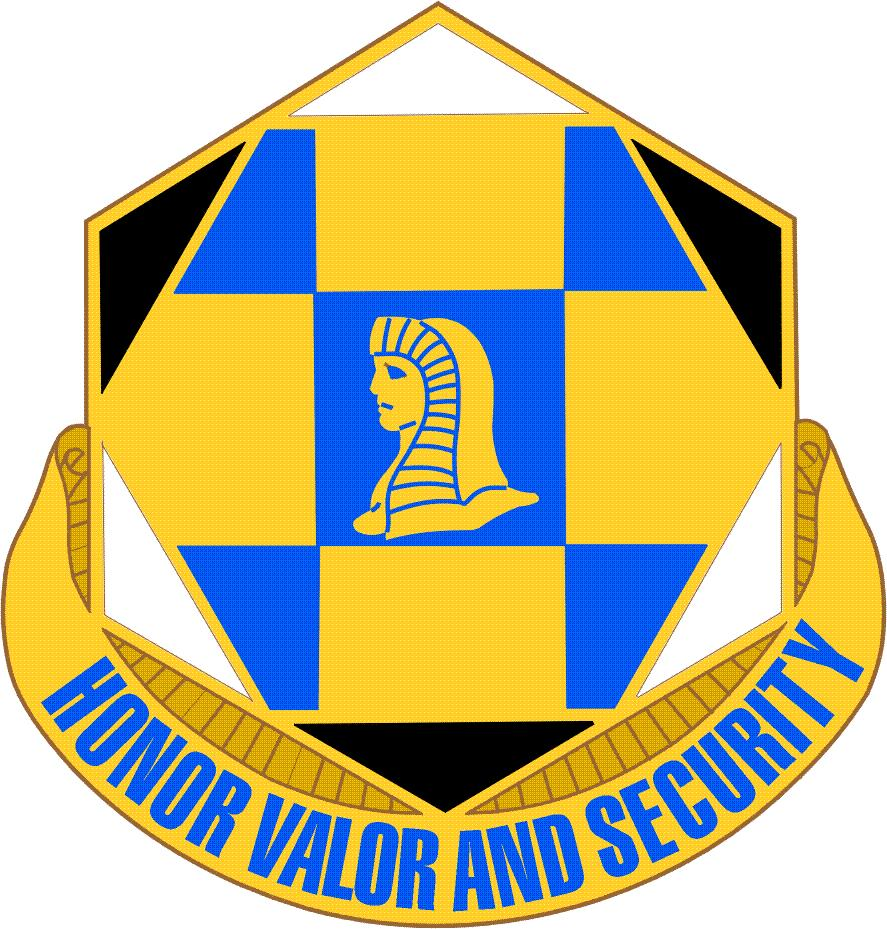
- Distinctive unit insignia

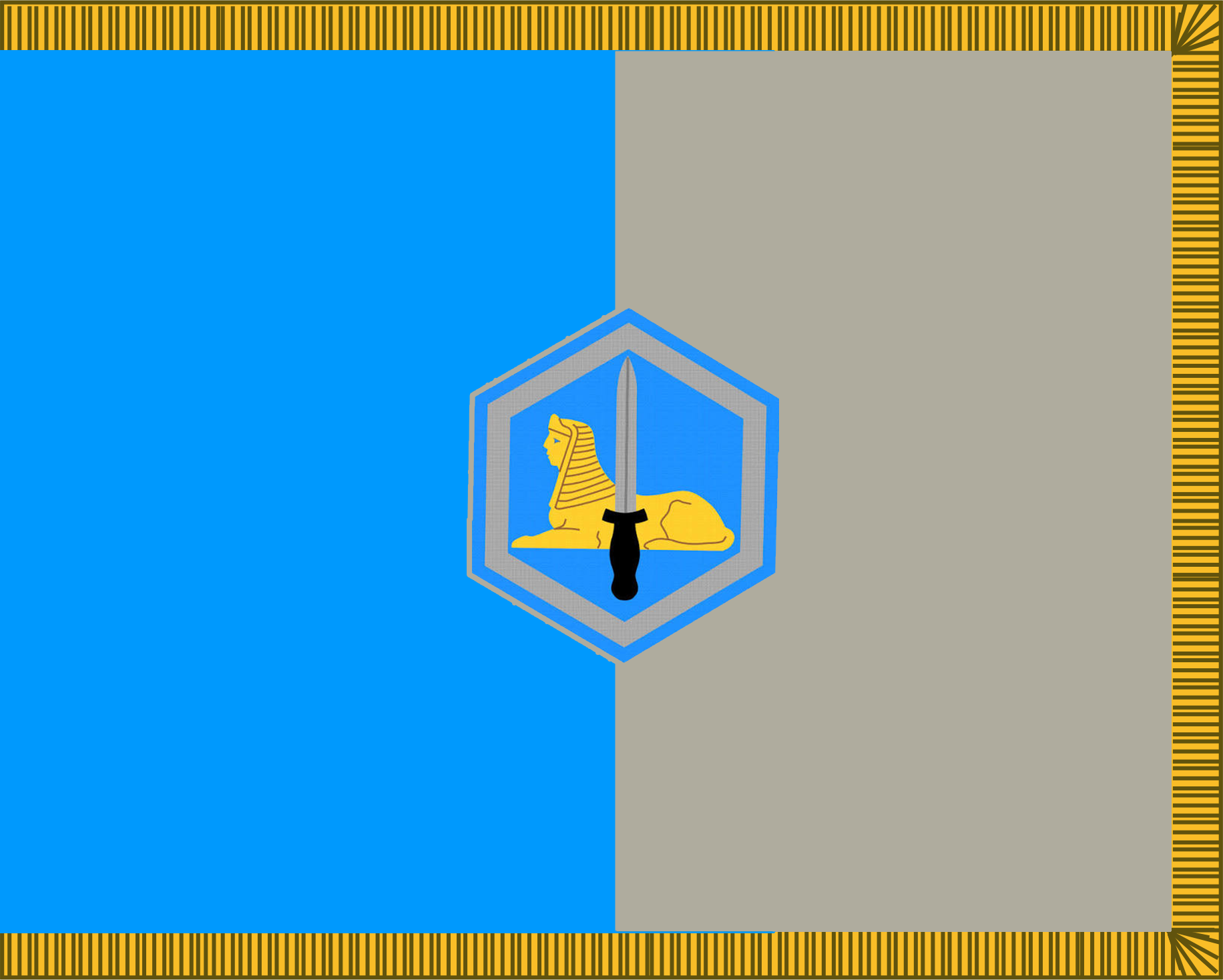
- 66th Military Intelligence Brigade Flag

The 66th Military Intelligence Brigade ("Six-Six-M-I" and 66th MIB) is a United States Army brigade, subordinate to United States Army Intelligence and Security Command and based at Wiesbaden Army Airfield, Wiesbaden, Germany. After years of history as a counter intelligence/intelligence group with headquarters in Munich and geographically dispersed detachments, it became a brigade on 16 October 1986, but was inactivated in July 1995. Reformed again as an intelligence group in 2002, it became a brigade again in 2008.

The unit's mission is to provide intelligence support to U.S. Army Europe and U.S. Army Africa. Part of the 66th Military Intelligence Brigade supports near real-time missions for deployed soldiers such as operations in Afghanistan and also Iraq. Members of the brigade provide mission support by utilizing databases running on computer clusters and communicate on encrypted networks, such as the NSA-certified TACLANE encrypted network.

The 66th MIB includes the 2nd Military Intelligence Battalion. Soldiers of the 66th MIB can be individually attached to other U.S. Army units in the course of their duties. Members are also on duty at U.S. Air Force installations, such as RAF Mildenhall. One brigade soldier was killed in action near a Forward Operating Base in Afghanistan in 2010. Unit members analyze sources in, among other languages, Russian and Persian.

The 24th Military Intelligence (MI) Battalion (BN) is the largest unit within 66th MIB. The 24th Military Intelligence Battalion conducts intelligence, surveillance, and reconnaissance (ISR) synchronization; and all-source intelligence analysis, production, and dissemination in support of national, joint, and USAREUR requirements. Headquartered in Wiesbaden, Germany, the 24th MI BN supports allies across the European Theater with intelligence requirements.

Soldiers in the brigade ideally hold qualifications in military intelligence and counter-intelligence, depending on their specific roles. Some also hold military (NWC, NDU, AFSC etc.) and/or civilian academic degrees. Entrance and intermediate training of military intelligence personnel is provided by the United States Army Intelligence Center at Fort Huachuca, Arizona.

== Organization 2025 ==
As of December 2025 the brigade consists of the following units:

- 66th Military Intelligence Brigade, in Wiesbaden (Germany)
  - 2nd Military Intelligence Battalion, at Wiesbaden Army Airfield (detachments throughout Europe)
  - 24th Military Intelligence Battalion (ISR), at Wiesbaden Army Airfield
  - 323rd Military Intelligence Battalion (Army Reserve), at Fort Meade, Maryland (attached)

== Misconduct in the past ==
- Soldiers of 66th MI Brigade have been involved in various degrees at the detention facility of Abu Ghraib (interrogation, analysis, witnessing detainee abuse).

== Leadership ==
The current head of the unit is the Brigade Commander, COL Steven J. Curtis.

== Shoulder sleeve insignia ==
Description

On a silver gray hexagon, one point up, with a 1/8 inch (0.32 cm) oriental blue border 3 inches (7.6 cm) in height and 2 5/8 inches (6.7 cm) in width overall, an oriental blue hexagon bearing a yellow sphinx superimposed by a silver gray dagger hilted black.

Symbolism

Oriental blue and silver gray, representing loyalty and determination, are the colors of the Military Intelligence branch. Yellow/gold symbolizes excellence. The hexagon borders reflect the numerical designation of the unit. The sphinx, a traditional military intelligence symbol, indicates observation, wisdom and discreet silence. The unsheathed dagger reflects the aggressive and protective requirements and the element of physical danger inherent in the mission of the unit.

Background

The shoulder sleeve insignia was approved on 27 August 1987 for the 66th Military Intelligence Brigade. It was cancelled on 17 July 2002. The insignia was reinstated effective 18 June 2003 and redesignated as an exception to policy for the 66th Military Intelligence Group, with description and symbolism updated. (TIOH Drawing Number A-1-740)

== Distinctive unit insignia ==
Description

A Gold color metal and enamel device 1 3/16 inches (3.0 cm) in width overall consisting of a hexagon composed of a chequy of (6) Black and White sections (one angle up), surmounted throughout by a smaller hexagon (flat side up) composed of a chequy of nine sections of Gold and Blue (oriental) with the center square charged with a Gold sphinx head, facing to the left, all above a Gold scroll inscribed "HONOR VALOR AND SECURITY" in Blue (Oriental) letters.

Symbolism

The black and white symbolize enlightenment and knowledge both day and night around the world. The chequy represents the unit's tactical and strategic capabilities in counterintelligence. The sphinx is a traditional intelligence symbol and indicates observation, wisdom and discreet silence. The hexagon within a hexagon "6-6" further distinguishes the numerical designation of the organization.

Background

The distinctive unit insignia was originally approved for the 66th Military Intelligence Group on 16 July 1969. It was redesignated for the 66th Military Intelligence Brigade on 8 October 1986. The insignia was redesignated effective 16 October 2002, with the description updated, for the 66th Military Intelligence Group.

== Lineage ==
Constituted 21 June 1944 in the Army of the United States as the 66th Counter Intelligence Corps Detachment.

Activated 1 July 1944 at Camp Rucker, Alabama.

Inactivated 12 November 1945 at Camp Kilmer, New Jersey.

Activated 10 November 1949 in Germany.

Allotted 20 September 1951 to the Regular Army.

Reorganized and redesignated 20 December 1952 as the 66th Counter Intelligence Corps Group.

Reorganized and redesignated 1 January 1960 as the 66th Military Intelligence Group.

Redesignated 25 July 1961 as the 66th Intelligence Corps Group.

Redesignated 15 October 1966 as the 66th Military Intelligence Group.

Reorganized and redesignated 16 October 1986 as Headquarters and Headquarters Company, 66th Military Intelligence Brigade.

Reorganized and redesignated 16 October 1992 as Headquarters and Headquarters Detachment, 66th Military Intelligence Brigade.

Inactivated 16 July 1995 in Germany.

Redesignated 28 February 2002 as Headquarters and Headquarters Detachment, 66th Military Intelligence Group.

Activated 16 October 2002 in Germany.

Redesignated July 2008 as the 66th Military Intelligence Brigade.

== See also ==
- 205th Military Intelligence Brigade (United States)
- Battlefield Surveillance Brigade
- Defense Clandestine Service
- Keith B. Alexander, former director of NSA, acted in command position in Germany with 66th MI Group
- Patch Barracks (Stuttgart), hosts Special Operations Command, Europe and NSA/CSS Representative Europe office (NCEUR)
- TACLANE, Network encryption device developed by NSA
