= EMARSS =

US Army airborne ISR system

EMARSS, or Enhanced Medium Altitude Reconnaissance and Surveillance System, is an intelligence, surveillance and reconnaissance (ISR) system installed on United States Army fixed-wing aircraft based on the twin-engine Beechcraft Super King Air 350ER modified MC-12W Liberty aircraft. The system, now manufactured by L3Harris Technologies, Inc., has tailored Distributed Common Ground System – Army (DCGS-A) software to facilitate processing, exploitation and rapid dissemination of intelligence derived from sensors. Its architecture ensures interoperability with multi-service / joint systems that comply with DoD information technology standards and Defense Information Systems Network for data transfer and dissemination. EMARSS is specifically designed for aerial exploitation battalions within US Army Intelligence and Security Command for command and control, mission planning, sustainment support and deployment

== Description ==
External images
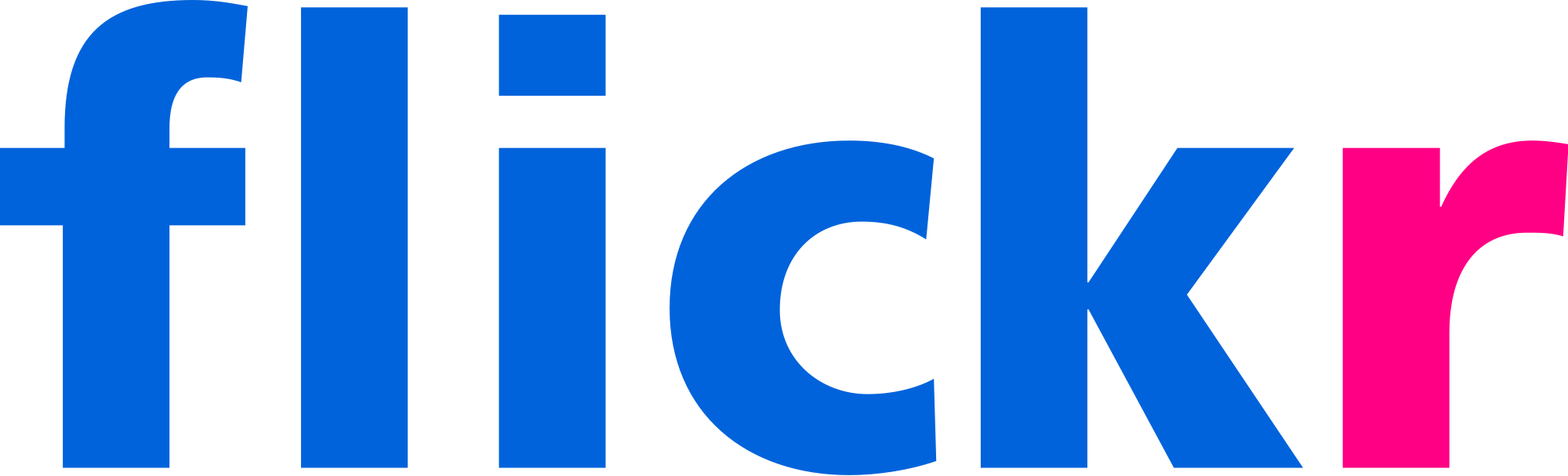
- Photos by Bill Word
- Raytheon-Beech MC-12W "Liberty"
- Raytheon-Beech MC-12W "Liberty" (full profile view)
- Raytheon Beechcraft MC-12W Liberty (nose high)

As an ISR platform, EMARSS provides persistent capabilities for detection, location, classification/identification, and to track surface targets in day/night, near-all-weather conditions with a high degree of timeliness and accuracy. The system consists of a military purposed Super King Air 350ER aircraft equipped with an electro-optic/infrared (EO/IR) sensor, full-motion video cameras, an imaging sensor called Wide Area Surveillance System, communications intelligence (COMINT) and signals intelligence (SIGINT) collection sensors, a precision geolocation sensor, line-of-sight (LOS) tactical and K_{a}/K_{u}-band beyond line-of-sight (BLOS) communications suites including datalinks, two DCGS-A workstations nicknamed Big Iron, and a self-protection suite. The original EMARSS aircraft would eventually be called EMARSS-S to distinguish it from other variants.

The system includes an integrated Northrop Grumman AN/ZPY-5 Vehicle and Dismounted Exploitation Radar (VADER) active electronically scanned array (AESA) synthetic-aperture radar pod with Ground Moving Target Indicator (GMTI) or with Dismount Moving Target Indicator (DMTI) developed in an Air Force-led project in 2009. The 400-pound (180 kg) pod had the distinct advantage over earlier GMTI radars in that it could identify multiple targets over a wide field of view. DMTI specifically refers to the ability to identify human-sized targets moving as slow as walking speed (in combination with other sensors), as opposed to GMTI which usually refers to larger sizes and greater speeds.

== History ==
In 2010, Boeing was awarded a contract by the US Army to build the first four EMARSS aircraft. But by 2012, budgetary concerns by the Government Accountability Office put the project on hold, resulting in the Army canceling the project entirely for a savings of US$1.2 billion (about $1.64 in 2024). The four planes delivered up to that point were to be handed off to the US Air Force, but that did not happen.

The first EMARSS prototype made its maiden flight in June 2013. While EMARSS was due to already be in service, further programmatic protests and inter-service differences over ownership delayed its introduction.

Low rate initial production (LRIP) was finally approved in August 2014. The Army disclosed its initial plan to field 12 EMARSS (plus options for 20 more), although it was unclear precisely how many of these will be converted MC-12Ws and how many will be new-builds. Of the 42 MC-12W "Project Liberty" aircraft procured, Janes Information Services believed between 8 and 12 would eventually be brought up to the EMARSS-M variant standard. As originally set out, the 18-month MC-12W to EMARSS-M modification contract included a 12-month system design and integration phase followed by a 6-month airworthiness and operational acceptance testing period.

In March 2015, a 12-month prototype modification contract worth US$31.8 million was awarded to then L-3 Communications to upgrade a single MC-12W Liberty aircraft to an EMARSS-M (multi-intelligence) configuration for flight and operational acceptance testing. The project was expected to complete by September 2015.

November 23, 2015, then L-3's Mission Integration division was awarded a contract worth US$129.66 million (equivalent to $172 million in 2024) to modify 13 aircraft with the EMARSS system. The four year modification contract was expected to be completed by November 2019. Altogether designated as EMARSS-FVM (follow-on variant modifications), aircraft to be modified included the MC-12W designated as EMARSS-M, with Constant Hawk and Tactical Operations-Light Detection and Ranging (TACOP-LiDAR) aircraft to be designated EMARSS-G (geospatial intelligence). This contract was intended to bring these aircraft configurations up to the MC-12S EMARSS counter-improvised explosive device (C-IED) standard previously developed by Boeing.

On Mar 12, 2017, Scout Media reported at least four EMARSS-S planes were operating in the United States Africa Command (AFRICOM) and United States Southern Command (SOUTHCOM) theaters. The EMARSS-G/M/V aircraft were still in follow-on operational test and evaluation at Fort Huachuca, Arizona at that time.

In October 2025, KeyAero reported all existing 24 EMARSS aircraft, operated by the 224th Military Intelligence Battalion (Aerial Exploitation) from Hunter Army Airfield, Fort Stewart, Georgia, were scheduled to be retired by the end of 2025.

=== Variants ===
Originally called simply EMARSS, in its final form, a total of 24 aircraft were configured into four variants including:

- EMARSS-G – 8 aircraft for geospatial intelligence (GEOINT) collecting data using the Wide Area Surveillance System, light detection and ranging (LiDAR), and day/night high definition full-motion video (HD FMV) for the National Geospatial-Intelligence Agency (NGA). These were originally Constant Hawk and TACOP-LiDAR aircraft.
- EMARSS-M – 8 aircraft multi-intelligence platform with SIGINT capabilities and HD FMV capabilities
- EMARSS-S – 4 aircraft conducting SIGINT with broad spectrum capabilities and HD FMV. The S- variant is installed on MC-12S (EMARSS-S) aircraft
- EMARSS-V – 4 VADER capable aircraft with SIGINT and HD FMV capabilities

=== Aircraft ===
As of July 2015, the Army reported the following EMARSS special electronic mission aircraft types and locations:

EMARSS Types and Locations
Location	Tail #	Aircraft #	Base Model	Model	Location
Fort Huachuca	1300282	FL-797	MARSS	B300	
Fort Huachuca	1300283	FL-797	MARSS	B300	
Fort Huachuca	1100265	FL-731	MC-12	MC-12S	
Fort Huachuca	1100266	FL-734	MC-12	MC-12S	
Fort Huachuca	1100267	FL-736	MC-12	MC-12S	
Fort Huachuca	1100268	FL-738	MC-12	MC-12S	
Hunter Army Airfield	1100282	FL-456	Constant Hawk	B300	
Hunter Army Airfield	1200278	FL-388	Constant Hawk	B300	
Hunter Army Airfield	1200279	FL-416	Constant Hawk	B300	
Hunter Army Airfield	1200280	FL-449	Constant Hawk	B300	
Hunter Army Airfield	1200281	FL-450	Constant Hawk	B300	
Hunter Army Airfield	N6351V	FL-751	Project Liberty Aircraft	MC-12W	
Hunter Army Airfield	N8007U	FL-737	Project Liberty Aircraft	MC-12W	
Hunter Army Airfield	1100283	FL-716	TACOP-LiDAR	B300	
Hunter Army Airfield	1100284	FL-757	TACOP-LiDAR	B300	
Hunter Army Airfield	1100285	FL-758	TACOP-LiDAR	B300	
Fort Hood	LPA1	TBD	Project Liberty Aircraft	MC-12W	
Fort Hood	LPA2	TBD	Project Liberty Aircraft	MC-12W	
Fort Hood	LPA3	TBD	Project Liberty Aircraft	MC-12W	
Fort Hood	LPA4	TBD	Project Liberty Aircraft	MC-12W	
Fort Hood	LPA5	TBD	Project Liberty Aircraft	MC-12W	
Fort Hood	LPA6	TBD	Project Liberty Aircraft	MC-12W	
Fort Hood	LPA7	TBD	Project Liberty Aircraft	MC-12W	
Fort Hood	LPA8	TBD	Project Liberty Aircraft	MC-12W	
Fort Hood	1100286	FL-780	MC-12	MC-12S	
Fort Hood	1100287	FL-834	MC-12	MC-12S	

== See also ==
- List of military electronics of the United States
