= Beechcraft RC-12 Guardrail =

Signals intelligence aircraft

RC-12 Guardrail
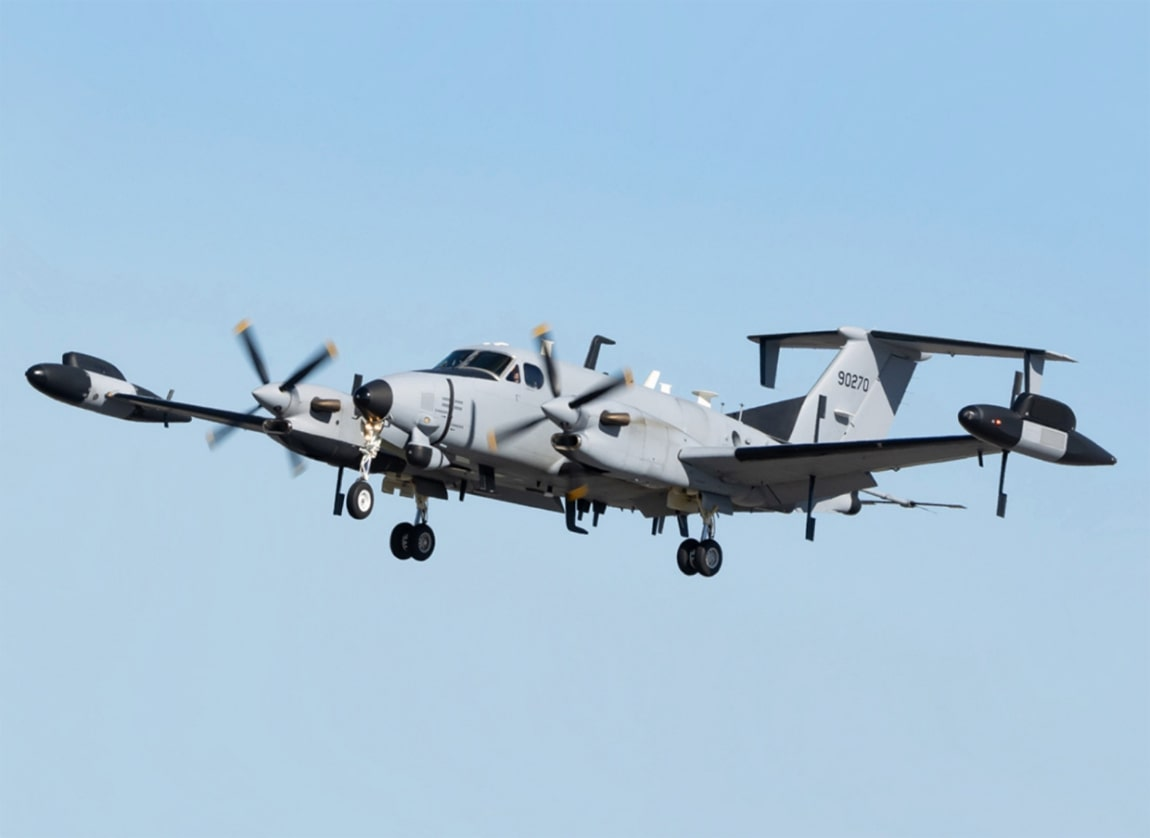
- RC-12N

General information
- Type: Signals intelligence aircraft
- Manufacturer: Beechcraft
- Status: Retired
- Primary user: United States Army

History
- Introduction date: 1983
- Retired: 11 December 2025
- Developed from: Beechcraft C-12 Huron

The Beechcraft RC-12 Guardrail was an airborne signals intelligence (SIGINT) collection platform based on the Beechcraft King Air and Super King Air. While the US military and specifically the United States Army have numerous personnel transport variants of the King Air platforms referred to with the general C-12 designation, the RC-12 specification refers to a heavily modified platform that collects SIGINT through various sensors and onboard processors.

== Design and development ==
The US Army RC-12 Guardrail platform, formally called Guardrail Common Sensor (GR/CS), began service in 1971. Prior to the early 1980s, the early Guardrail variants were based on the U-21. After adopting the C-12 platform over the U-21, the Guardrail platform received structural, power plant, and equipment upgrades as noted by the various models described below.

Initially, the US Army had 13 RC-12Ds converted from C-12Ds, with deliveries starting in mid-1983. One aircraft was assigned to US Army Forces Command (FORSCOM) at Fort McPherson, Georgia, and the remainder to the 1st Military Intelligence Battalion at Wiesbaden, Germany, and the 2nd Military Intelligence Battalion at Stuttgart, Germany. The German-based aircraft were reassigned in late 1991 to the 3rd, 15th, and 304th Military Intelligence Battalions at Camp Humphreys (South Korea), Fort Hood (Texas) and Fort Huachuca (Arizona), respectively. One was converted back to an earlier configuration as C-12D-1.

The next model was the RC-12G. Three RC-12G were delivered in 1985 after conversion from C-12D airframes. These aircraft served in Latin America and then with the 138th Military Intelligence Company (Aerial Exploitation) in Orlando, Florida, before being moved into storage at Fort Sill, Oklahoma.

After the RC-12G, the next model was the RC-12H. The initial system contractor, ESL Inc., delivered 6 RC-12H in 1988 for the 3rd Military Intelligence Battalion at Camp Humphreys in Pyongtaek, South Korea.

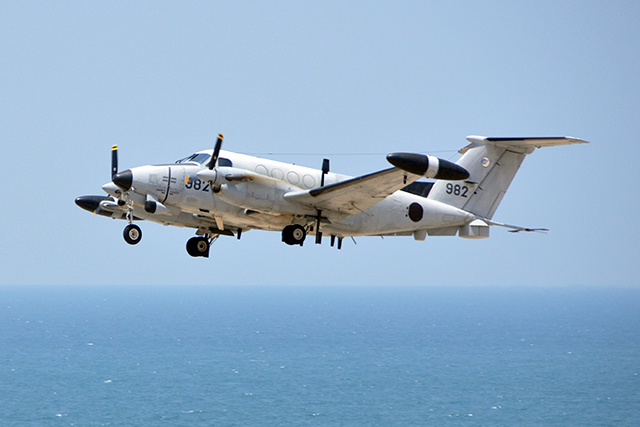
A Beechcraft RC-12D of IAF (Kukia) takes off from Sde Dov base (Tel Aviv), 2014

The next model was the RC-12K, after the RC-12H. The US Army ordered nine RC-12Ks in October 1985, of which eight replaced RC-12Ds in the 1st Military Intelligence Battalion in May 1991. One of these was lost in an accident. The ninth US Army aircraft was retained by the contractor, Raytheon, for conversion to the planned RC-12N configuration. An additional 2 RC-12K aircraft were delivered to Israel in May–June 1991.

The prototype RC-12N was converted from an RC-12K. A total of 15 were converted by E-Systems and delivered 1992-93 to the 224th Military Intelligence Battalion at Hunter Army Airfield, Georgia and the 304th Military Intelligence Battalion at Libby Army Airfield, Fort Huachuca, Arizona. One of these was lost in an accident.

These led to the next model, the RC-12P. A total of 9 RC-12P aircraft were delivered to ESL/TRW at Moffett Federal Airfield in late 1994 and 1995. These airframes remained there in 1999.

Three RC-12Ps were then modified by Raytheon and TRW to become RC-12Q. They were transferred to TRW in 1996 for outfitting, where they remained until 1999. The aircraft featured a prominent dorsal radome housing a satellite communications antenna.

The RC-12 in various versions, to include the newest RC-12X and RC-12X+ have seen deployments to Operation Enduring Freedom and Operation Iraqi Freedom. As of July 2012, Northrop Grumman announced that its RC-12X Guardrails had completed over 1,000 missions since going into theatre in 2011. Those upgrades and force realignments saw those newest models replace older RC-12D and RC-12K variants in Korea.

In 2017 a $462 million RC-12X program, by Northrop Grumman, upgraded all aircraft in the Army's RC-12 fleet to the RC-12X standard, replacing or upgrading all older variants. The Guardrail Modernization program extended the life of the aircraft to 2025 and introduced new payloads to the system with enhanced capabilities. The program enhanced the sustainability of the RC-12X through commonality, a new glass cockpit, structural upgrades, and significant hardware and software improvements.

== Description ==
GR/CS was a "fixed-wing, airborne, SIGINT-collection and precision-targeting location system." It collected low-, mid- and high-band radio signals and ELINT signals, identified and classified them, determined source location, and provided near-real-time reporting.

L-3 Communications (now L3Harris Technologies) provided the critical air-to-ground data link subsystems for the program, the most significant being the Ku-band Tactical Common Data Link (TCDL). This high-speed, secure data link was the "backbone" of the GR/CS system. A "tethered" system, it transmitted collected signals and data in real-time from the aircraft to the Guardrail Ground Baseline (GGB) for processing to intelligence analysts on the ground versus on the aircraft.

GR/CS used a Guardrail Mission Operations Facility (MOF) for the control, data processing and message center for the system.”

== Variants ==
- The RC-12D aircraft used in the Improved Guardrail V system was based on the King Air Model A200CT. This US Army Special Electronic Mission version carried the AN/USD-9 Improved Guardrail V remote-controlled communications intercept and direction-finding system. Associated ground equipment included the AN/TSQ-105(V)4 integrated processing facility, AN/ARM-63(V)4 AGE flightline van, and the AN/TSC-87 tactical commander's terminal. Five new-build RC-12D-like aircraft were sold to Israel for 191 Squadron at Sde Dov. These aircraft were referred to either as RC-12D-FW or FWC-12D, with the FW reportedly being an abbreviation for "Field Wind," possibly a codeword for Israeli-specific equipment fitted to the aircraft. The codeword "Big Apple" was related to these aircraft.
- The RC-12G, used for the Crazy Horse system, was a US Army Special Electronic Mission aircraft based on the King Air A200CT. Generally similar to RC-12D, the maximum takeoff weight was increased to 6,800 kilograms (15,000 pounds).
- The RC-12H aircraft used for Guardrail/Common Sensor System 3 (Minus) was a US Army Special Electronic Mission aircraft that was generally similar to the RC-12D, though with the maximum takeoff weight increased to 6,800 kilograms (15,000 pounds).
- The RC-12K aircraft used for Guardrail/Common Sensor System 4 was similar to the RC-12H, but with a more powerful 1,100 shp (820 kW) PT6A-67 turboprop engine and a maximum takeoff weight increased to 7,250 kilograms (16,000 pounds).
- The RC-12N aircraft used in Guardrail/Common Sensor System 1 was generally similar to the RC-12K, though with a 7,350 kilogram (16,200 pound) maximum takeoff weight, and equipped with dual EFIS and aircraft survivability equipment/avionics control system (ASE/ACS). The prototype RC-12N was converted from an RC-12K.

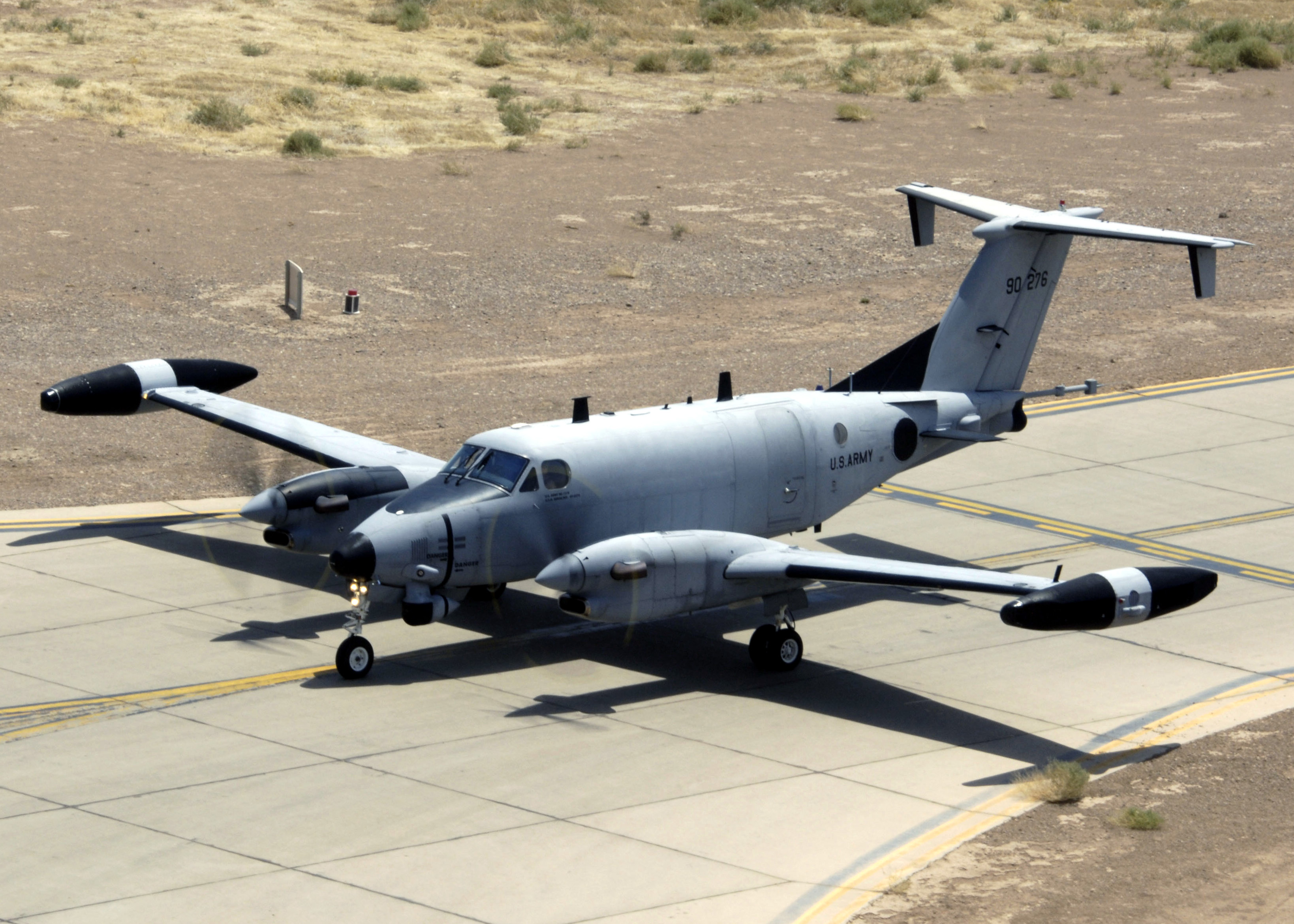
A RC-12P

- The RC-12P aircraft used in Guardrail/Common Sensor System 2 had the same avionics and power plant as the RC-12N, though with different mission equipment (including datalink capability), fibre optic cabling, and smaller and lighter wing pods. The maximum takeoff weight was increased to 7,480 kilograms (16,500 pounds).
- The RC-12Q aircraft, referred to as the Direct Air Satellite Relay, consisted of 3 RC-12Ps modified by Raytheon and TRW to act as 'mother ships' to expand the RC-12P's operational area outside satellite 'footprints.' The airframes were transferred to TRW in 1996 for outfitting, where they remained in 1999. The aircraft featured a prominent dorsal radome housing a satellite communications antenna.
- The RC-12X aircraft was a further improved RC-12 for use with the GRCS, which included expanded frequency ranges, a capability to locate signals in both stand-off and stand-in modes, and an adaptive beam-forming antenna array that is capable of locating emitters in the dense signal environments.
- The RC-12X+ was a further improvement on the RC-12X and represents the latest variant of the system currently fielded as of 2016.

== Retirement ==
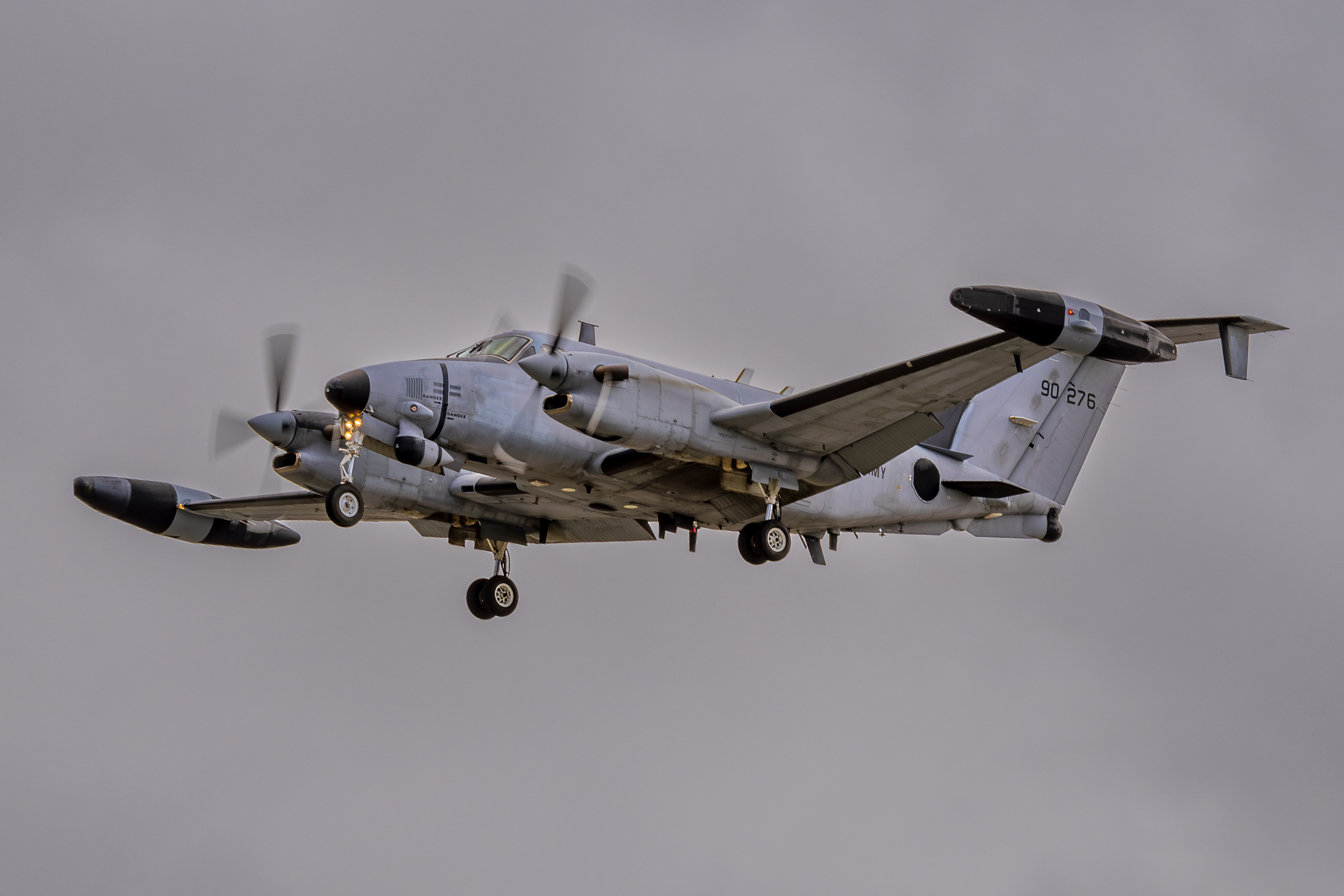
An RC-12X Guardrail in United States Army service in March 2023, less than three years before the programme was retired

The US Army officially completed the retirement of the Guardrail Common Sensor (RC12X) program on 11 December 2025.

The divestment was part of a broader effort to retire legacy turboprop intelligence aircraft to make way for modern jet-based systems.

The last Guardrail aircraft flew its final mission in South Korea in July 2025. The 501st Military Intelligence Brigade at Camp Humphreys hosted a "Pacific Sunset" ceremony on July 30–31, 2025, at Desidario Army Airfield to formally bid farewell to the platform. The Army announced the full completion of the fleet's divestment on December 11, 2025.

Replacement Program: The Guardrail system is being replaced by the High Accuracy Detection and Exploitation System (HADES), a new sensor suite mounted on faster, higher-altitude commercial business jets like the Bombardier Global 6500 designed to see deeper into enemy territory.

== Incidents and accidents ==
On 16 April 1997, the 224th Military Intelligence Battalion lost an RC-12N and 2 crew members in a fatal training accident. The following year on 6 November 1998, the 1st Military Intelligence Battalion lost a RC-12K and 2 crew members in a similar training accident.

In both accidents, the United States Army Safety Center Accident Boards listed in their recommendations to TRADOC to 'Re-evaluate the ATM Tasks for stalls, slow flight and VMC.' In February 1999, Commanding General, USAIC and FH, Major General John D. Thomas, sent a senior standardization instructor pilot and the 305th Military Intelligence Battalion Safety Officer to USAAVNC to review the RC-12K Accident Board findings to determine if training was a contributing factor. They recommended to Major General Thomas that the TC 1-219, Tasks for Slow Flight, Stalls and VMC, be rewritten.

== Specifications (RC-12H) ==
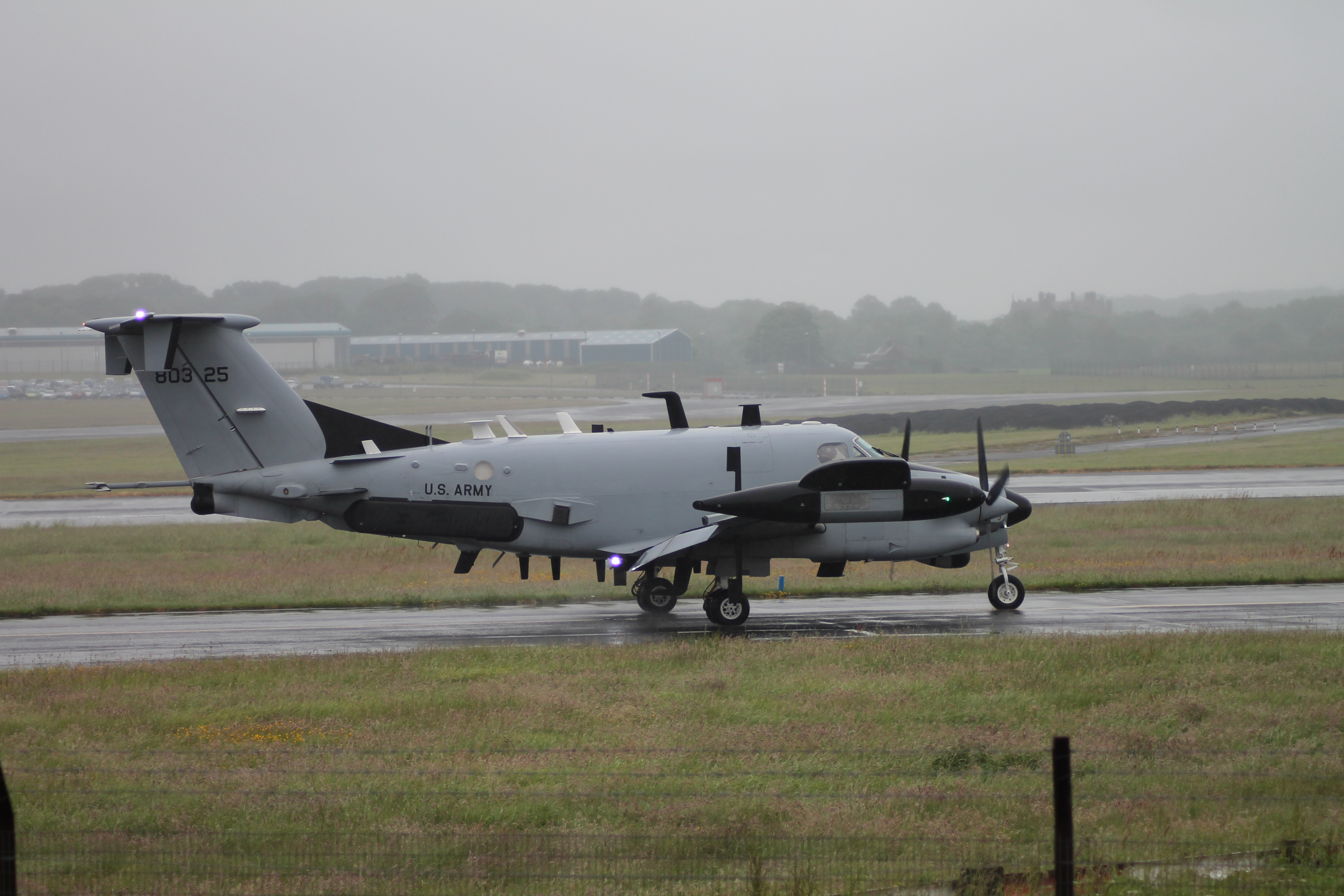
A Beechcraft RC-12N, 2013

Data from operating manual

General characteristics

- Length: 43 ft 9 in (13.34 m)
- Wingspan: 58 ft 6 in (17.83 m)
- Height: 14 ft 8 in (4.47 m)
- Empty weight: 11,500 lb (5,216 kg) (zero fuel weight)
- Gross weight: 15,090 lb (6,845 kg)
- Max takeoff weight: 15,000 lb (6,804 kg)
- Powerplant: 2 × Pratt & Whitney Canada PT6A-41 turboprop engines, 850 shp (630 kW) each
- Propellers: 3-bladed constant-speed propellers

== See also ==
Related development

- Beechcraft C-12 Huron
- Beechcraft King Air
- Beechcraft Super King Air
- Beechcraft 1900

Related lists

- List of military electronics of the United States
