= 153rd =

153rd is the ordinal form of the number 153. 153rd or One hundred and fifty-third may also refer to:

- A fraction, 1/153, equal to one of 153 equal parts

== Geography ==
- 153rd meridian east, a line of longitude
- 153rd meridian west, a line of longitude

== Military ==
- 153rd Brigade (disambiguation)
- 153rd Division (disambiguation)
- 153rd Regiment (disambiguation)

== See also ==
- 153 (disambiguation)
- June 2, 153rd day of the year in a standard year
