= 153rd Regiment =

153rd Regiment may refer to:

- 153rd Infantry Regiment (United States)
  - 1st Battalion, 153rd Infantry Regiment
  - 2nd Battalion, 153rd Infantry Regiment
  - 3rd Battalion, 153rd Infantry Regiment
- 153rd Cavalry Regiment
- 153rd (Highland) Transport Regiment, a unit of the United Kingdom
- 153rd Field Regiment, Royal Artillery

== American Civil War regiments ==
- 153rd Illinois Infantry Regiment
- 153rd Indiana Infantry Regiment
- 153rd Pennsylvania Infantry Regiment
- 153rd New York Infantry Regiment
- 153rd Ohio Infantry Regiment

== See also ==
- 153rd Brigade (disambiguation)
- 153rd Division (disambiguation)
