= 153 =

153 may refer to:

- AD 153, a year
- 153 BC, a year
- 153 (number), the natural number following 152 and preceding 154
- 153 series
- Untitled #153
- Sonnet 153
- 153 Hilda, a main-belt asteroid
- 153 (Highland) Transport Regiment, Scotland
- 153 (Leicestershire Yeomanry) Field Regiment, England

== See also ==
- Class 153 (disambiguation)
- NH 153 (disambiguation)
