= 2nd Battalion, 153rd Infantry Regiment =

2d Battalion, 153d Infantry Regiment (First Arkansas)
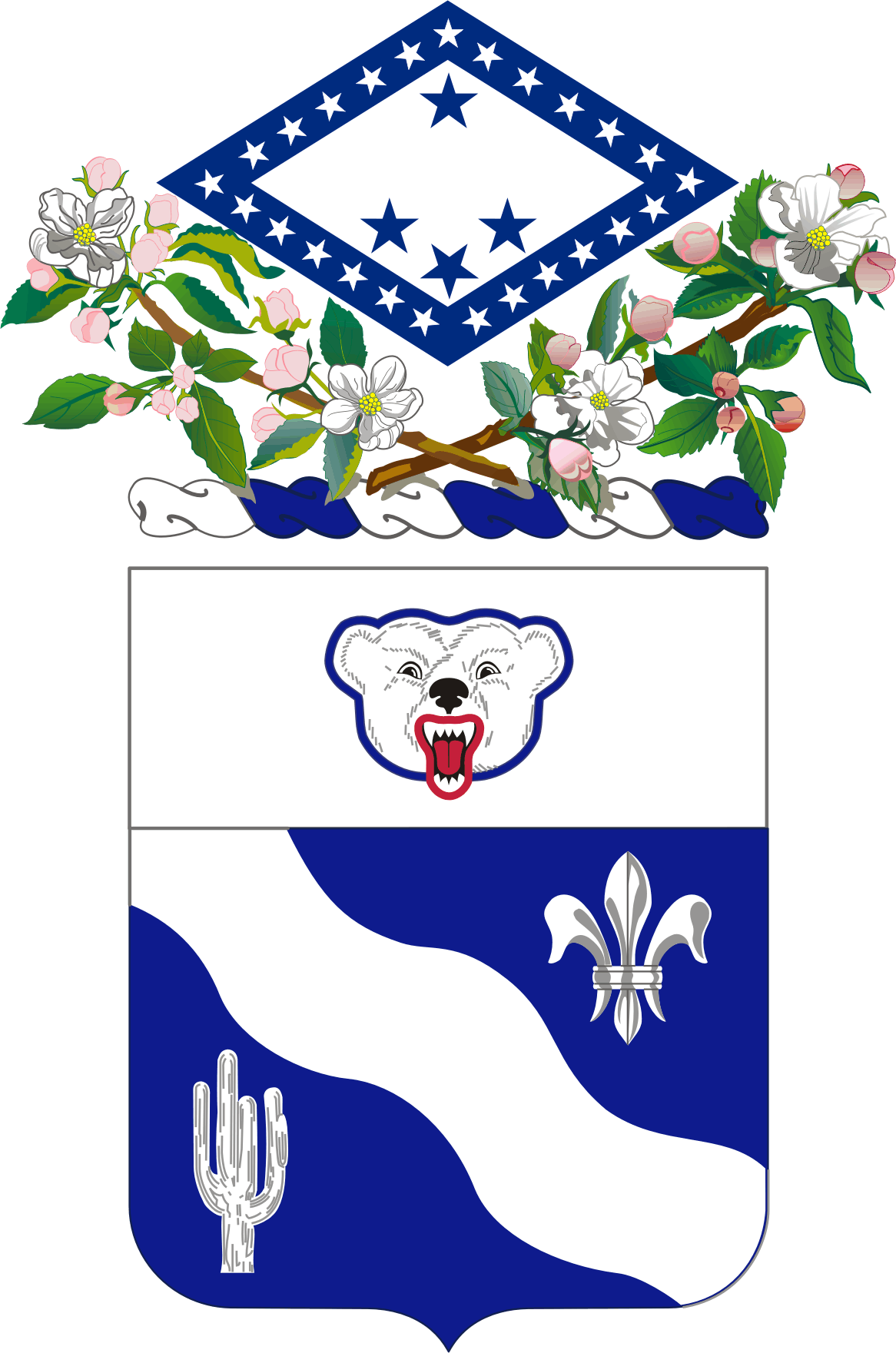
- Regiment coat of arms
- Active: 1890–1919, 1920–44, 1946–present
- Country: United States
- Allegiance: Arkansas
- Branch: Army National Guard
- Type: Infantry
- Size: One battalion
- Part of: 39th Infantry Brigade Combat Team
- Headquarters: Searcy, Arkansas
- Nickname: "First Arkansas"
- Motto: Let's Go
- Facings: Light blue
- Assault rifle: M4A1 carbine
- Campaigns: World War I World War II: Aleutian Islands; War on terrorism

Commanders
- Current commander: James Lehner

Insignia
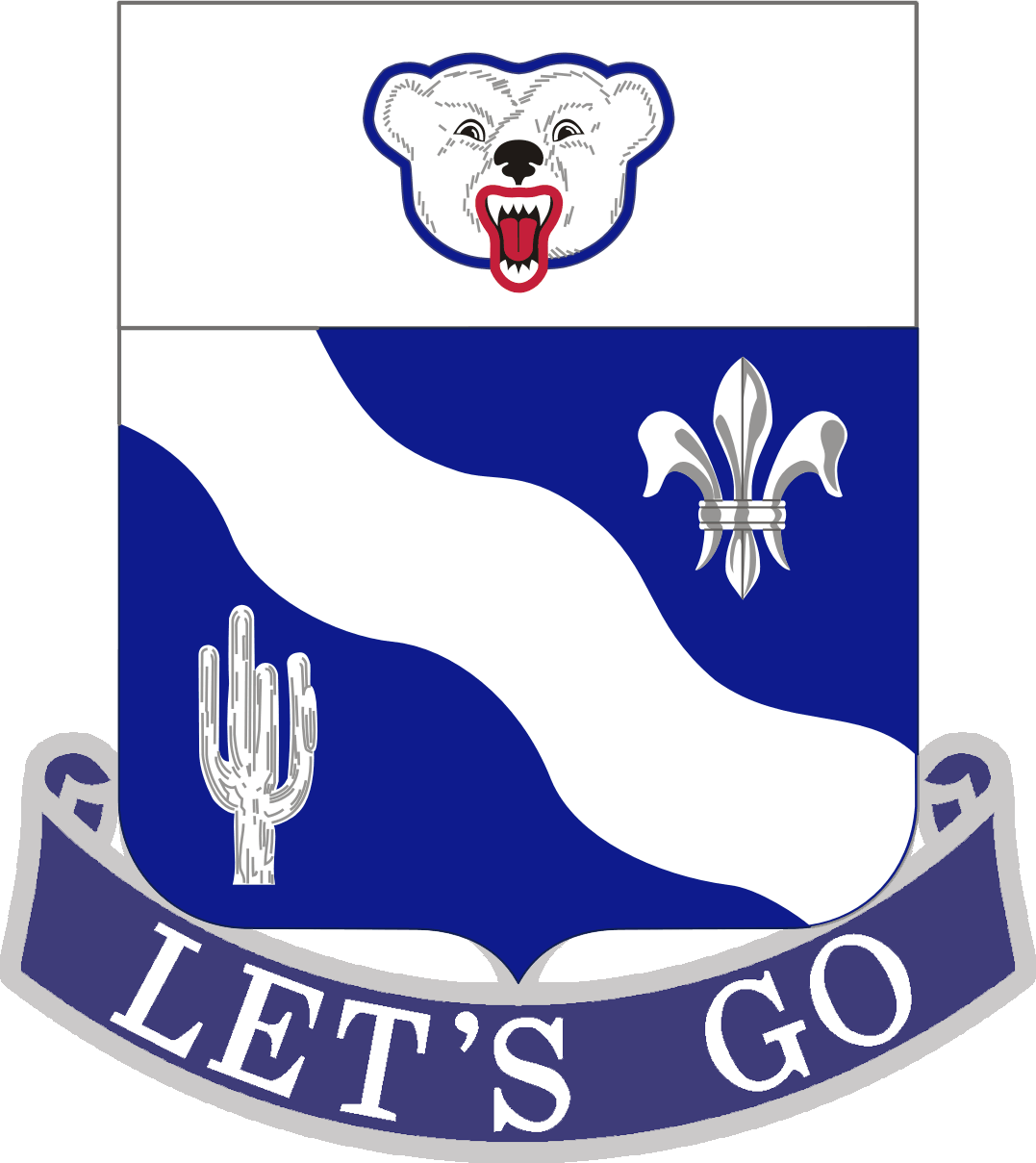
- Regimental Insignia

The 2d Battalion, 153d Infantry Regiment (First Arkansas), is an infantry battalion of the Arkansas Army National Guard, headquartered at Searcy, assigned to the 39th Infantry Brigade Combat Team. During World War II, the battalion was stationed in the Aleutian Islands. Following the attacks of 11 September 2001, the 2nd Battalion, 153rd Infantry, nicknamed the "Gunslingers", deployed to the Sinai on a peace keeping mission in order to free regular army soldiers for service elsewhere. The soldiers of the 2–153rd deployed under the flag of the 3rd Battalion, 153rd Infantry during Operation Iraqi Freedom II. The battalion provided disaster relief operations to the citizens of Louisiana in the aftermath of Hurricane Katrina. The Gunslingers were deployed to Iraq a second time in 2008 as a security forces battalion and conducted convoy security operations in western Iraq. Most recently, members of the 2-153rd deployed to Central America as part of the Regionally aligned forces mission in order to carry out a train-the-trainer and security cooperation mission in Guatemala, Honduras and El Salvador. See also

== Background ==
The history of the 2nd Battalion, 153rd Infantry as an individual battalion really begins with the reorganization of the 39th Infantry Division in 1967 and the creation of the 39th Infantry Brigade (Separate). For history of the 2nd Battalion prior to 1967, see 153rd Infantry Regiment (United States) and 39th Infantry Division (United States).

== Creation of 39th Infantry Brigade ==
In 1967 the 39th Infantry Division was reorganized and redesignated as the 39th Infantry Brigade (Separate) and in 1973 was paired with the US 101st Airborne Division as a training partner and became an air-assault brigade.

In 1994 the 39th was again reorganized and gained its designation as an "enhanced" brigade.

In 1999, the 39th became part of the 7th Infantry Division under the Army Integrated Division concept which paired National Guard and Reserve brigades with active duty headquarters and support units.

In 2006 the 39th Brigade was reorganized as a brigade combat team under the United States Army's new modular design concept.

== Overseas training deployments ==
The 2nd Battalion, 153rd Infantry units conducted numerous overseas training rotations throughout the 1980s and early 1990s.

- 1981, Company A, 2–153 (Walnut Ridge and Piggott) conducts Annual Training in Great Britain with the Royal Welsh Fusiliers as part of the Volunteer Warrior/Hard Charger Exercise.
- 1988, Companies B and C, 2-153 IN conduct Annual Training in Great Britain as a part of Operation "Glo Worm/Rattlesnake", at Camp Crickhowell, Wales, hosted by members of the 5th Light Infantry English Citizen Soldiers.
- 1991, selected members of 2–153rd accompanied 1–153rd Infantry on a SOUTHCOM rotation to the Jungle Operations Training Center (JOTO) at Fort Sherman, Panama.
- 1992, Companies A, B and C, 2-153 conduct Annual Training in Honduras in three separate rotations.

== Operation Southern Watch ==
Company B, 2nd Battalion, 153 Infantry, and Company B, 3rd Battalion, 153rd Infantry of the 39th BCT were activated for Operation Southern Watch, May through September 1999. B/2-153 deployed to Kuwait and provided security at Patriot Missile Batteries during these deployments. The mission lasted a total of seven months, and was the first "pure" National Guard effort in the region. Company C, 1st Battalion, 153rd Infantry carried on the 39th's role in Operation Southern Watch when they replaced Company B, 2-153rd in September 1999.

== Multinational Force and Observers (MFO) ==
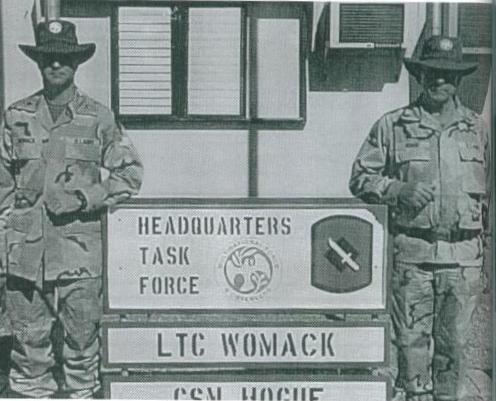
LTC Steve Womack and CSM Bill Hogue in front of the Task Force Headquarters, Egypt

On 10 October 2001, 2–153 IN "Gunslinger" was activated in support of the Global War on Terror. Second Battalion was sent to Egypt in order to take over the Multinational Force and Observers mission, freeing up regular army infantry units to deploy to Afghanistan.

The 2-153's mission during the MFO was: "...to supervise the implementation of the security provisions of the Egyptian-Israeli Treaty of Peace and employ best efforts to prevent any violation of its terms." This mission was accomplished by carrying out four tasks: Operating checkpoints, observation posts and conducting reconnaissance patrols on the international border as well as within Zone C; verification of the terms of the peace treaty not less than twice a month; verification of the terms of the peace treaty within forty eight hours, upon the request of either party, and ensuring freedom of international marine navigation in the Strait of Tiran and access to the Gulf of Aqaba.

This was the first "pure" National Guard takeover of the MFO mission. 2-153rd deactivated on 11 October 2002.

== Operation Iraqi Freedom II ==
=== Ramp-up ===
In 2002 the 39th Brigade was notified that it would be participating in a rotation to the Joint Readiness Training Center (JRTC) at Fort Polk, LA. For National Guard units, a rotation to JRTC is a three-year process that provides additional money, resources and training opportunities in order to improve unit readiness before the actual rotation through the JRTC. The battalion was required to complete a mission rehearsal exercise during the annual training in 2003 which was conducted at Fort Chaffee, Arkansas. Less than a month after the completion of this major training milestone, the 39th Brigade received its alert for deployment to Iraq in support of Operation Iraqi Freedom on 28 July 2003.

=== Consolidation ===
Because of the 2002 deployment of the 2–153rd to the MFO, the battalion was deemed non-deployable as an organization; however the soldiers of the battalion were to deploy. Brigadier General Chastain decided to transfer the battalion commander and staff from 2–153rd to 3–153rd. The 3-153rd commander and staff were transferred to the 2–153rd and were designated to function as the brigade's rear detachment during OIF II. This transfer lead to the 3-153rd often being referred to as the "Two Thirds Battalion". 3–153rd adopted the 2–153rd nickname and call sign, "Gunslingers" for OIF II.

During consolidation of the 1st, 2nd and 3rd Battalions, 153rd Infantry regiment for OIF II, efforts were made to maintain unit integrity at least the platoon level. The units were consolidated in the following fashion.

Battalion Headquarters	OIF II Deployed Unit	Consolidated Units
3rd Battalion, 153rd Infantry	HHC, 3–153rd	HHC, 2–153rd
	Company A, 3–153rd	Company A and a Plt from C/3-153rd
	Company B, 3–153rd	Company B, 2–153rd
	Company C, 3–153rd	Company A, 2–153rd and a Plt from C/2-153rd
	Company D, 3–153rd	Company D, 2–153rd and a Plt from D/3-153rd
1st Battalion, 153rd Infantry	HHC, 1–153rd	HHC, 1–153rd
	Company A 1–153rd	Company A and 2 Plts from B/1-153rd
	Company B, 1–153rd	Company B, 3–153rd and a Plt from D/3-153rd
	Company C, 1–153rd	Company C, 1–153rd
	Company D, 1–153rd	Company D, 1–153rd and 1 Plt from D/3-153rd

While the 2nd Battalion, did not officially deploy for OIF II, its soldiers did. For a history of their accomplishments, see the articles on 1-153rd IN and 3-153rd IN.

== Reorganization as Brigade Combat Team ==
Upon redeployment in 2005, the 39th Brigade immediately began a major reorganization that transformed the brigade from an enhanced separate brigade (eSB) to an infantry brigade combat team (IBCT) under the United States Army's new Modular Design. This redesign of the army was intended to make the force more easily deployable by making brigades more self-contained and less dependent on support organizations at the division level. Major changes for the 2nd Battalion, 153rd Infantry included the activation of a forward support company, Company F, 39th BSB. Along with this reorganization came a significant re-stationing of several units within the state of Arkansas.

== Operation Katrina ==
After Hurricane Katrina hit Louisiana in August 2005, members of the 2nd Battalion, 153rd Infantry were deployed to New Orleans by C-130s from the Little Rock Air Force Base to support the relief and recovery efforts there. Under tactical control of the Louisiana National Guard, 2–153rd soldiers were given the mission of providing security and food and water to the citizens of Louisiana. Members of the 2–153rd IN and the 39th IBCT remained deployed in Louisiana until February 2006.

== Operation Jump Start ==
In June 2006 the 39th Brigade began deploying troops along the southwest border with Mexico as part of Operation Jump Start. The brigade manned two sectors of the border around Lordsburg, New Mexico and near Deming, New Mexico. Unit members occupied observation posts and reported activity along the border the United States Border Patrol. Various battalions within the 39th Brigade were tasked with supplying volunteer companies during this period. While serving in Operation Jump Start members of the battalion were able to begin preparing for the 39th Brigade's second deployment in support of Operation Iraqi Freedom. It is ironic that the 1st Arkansas Infantry, the parent unit of the 153rd Infantry Regiment was stationed in these same areas of New Mexico ninety years earlier during General "Black Jack" Pershing's punitive Mexican Expedition against Pancho Villa.

== Second OIF deployment ==
The 2nd Battalion, 153rd Infantry received an alert for a deployment in support of Operation Iraqi Freedom in April 2007. Members of the battalion had been home almost exactly two years since demobilizing after OIF II. This deployment would be dramatically different from the battalion's first deployment to OIF. Instead of deploying as an infantry battalion, the 2–153rd was tasked with filling five Unit Requests for Forces (URFs). These taskings involved supplying Convoy Security Companies to escort logistical convoys in Iraq. Additionally, Instead of an eighteen-month mobilization, with twelve months actually deployed to Iraq like the first tour, this mobilization would be for a total of twelve months, with approximately ten months being deployed to the combat theater.

The 2–153rd was placed on duty in October 2007 to prepare for its deployment to Iraq while still under state control. It began a ninety-day pre-mobilization training period at Chaffee Maneuver Training Center (CMTC) on 1 October 2007. This allowed the unit to perform certain tasks in Arkansas and allowed unit members to be closer to their families for a longer period of time. The battalion was placed in federal service in January 2008 and trained at Camp Shelby, Mississippi until it deployed beginning in March 2008 to Iraq.

Upon reaching its final destinations, the 2–153rd fell under the Tactical Command (TACON) of Regular Army units, primarily the 13th Sustainment Command (Expeditionary). The 39th IBCT retained Administrative Command (ADCON) of all brigade elements. 2–153rd was stationed in Al Asad Airbase, Iraq and was organized as a Convoy Security Battalion. The battalion provided convoy security to Theater Sustainment Convoys using the Jordan Line of Communications from Trebil to Al Asad and Forward Operating Base TQ. The unit conducted seventy six, Combat Logistical Patrols, each lasting four to six days, while driving over 1,587,000 miles. 2–153rd experience one casualty during OIF 07-08 when an escort vehicle was accidentally struck while providing security at an intersection by one of the escorted vehicles.

=== Order of battle ===
Battalion	Company	Station
2nd Battalion, 153 Infantry Regiment	HHC, 2-153 IN	Al Asad Airbase
	Company A, 2–153 IN	Al Asad Airbase
	Company B, 2-153 IN	Al Asad Airbase
	Company C, 2-153 IN	Al Asad Airbase
	Company D, 2-153 IN	Al Asad Airbase

The 2–153rd redeployed to Camp Shelby, Mississippi in December 2008 and demobilized.

== Fallen soldiers ==
=== Operation Iraqi Freedom 2008 ===
- SGT James M. Clay, Age 25, of Mountain Home, Ark.; Little Rock, Ark.; died 13 November 2008 in Anbar province, Iraq, of injuries sustained in a vehicle accident.

== Campaign participation credit ==
=== World War I ===
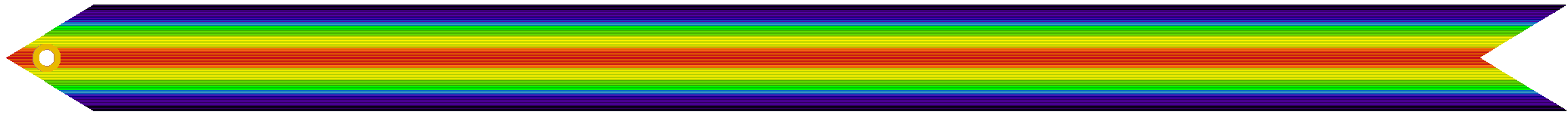

=== World War II ===
- Aleutian Islands 1942–1943

=== War on terrorism ===
- Iraqi Surge - 2007 to 2008

== Previous commanders ==
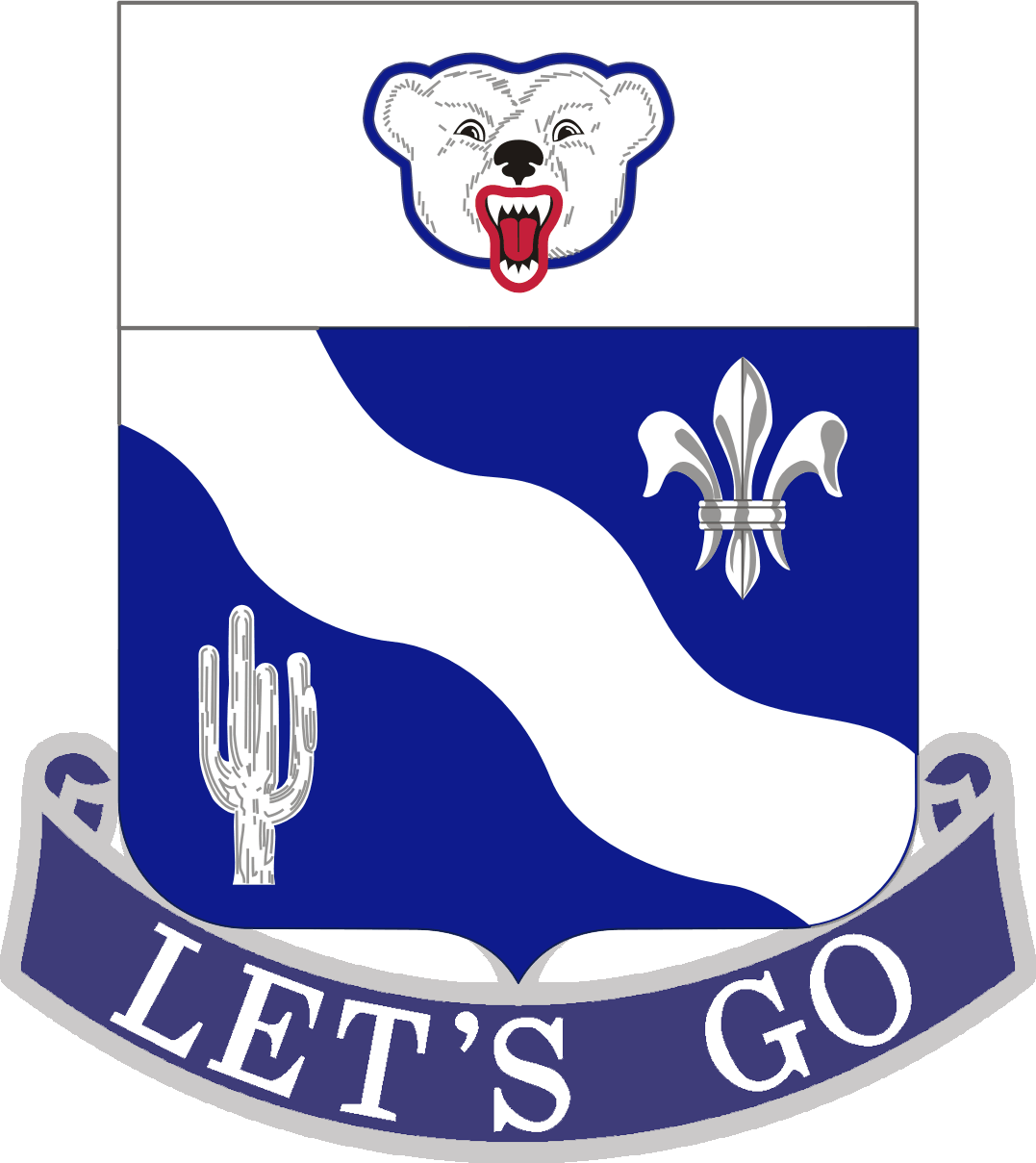
LTC Robert H. James

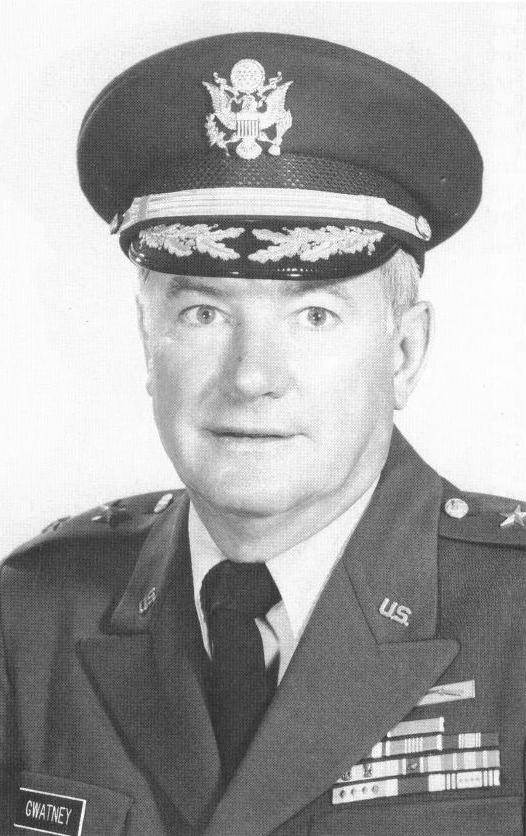
LTC Harold L. Gwatney

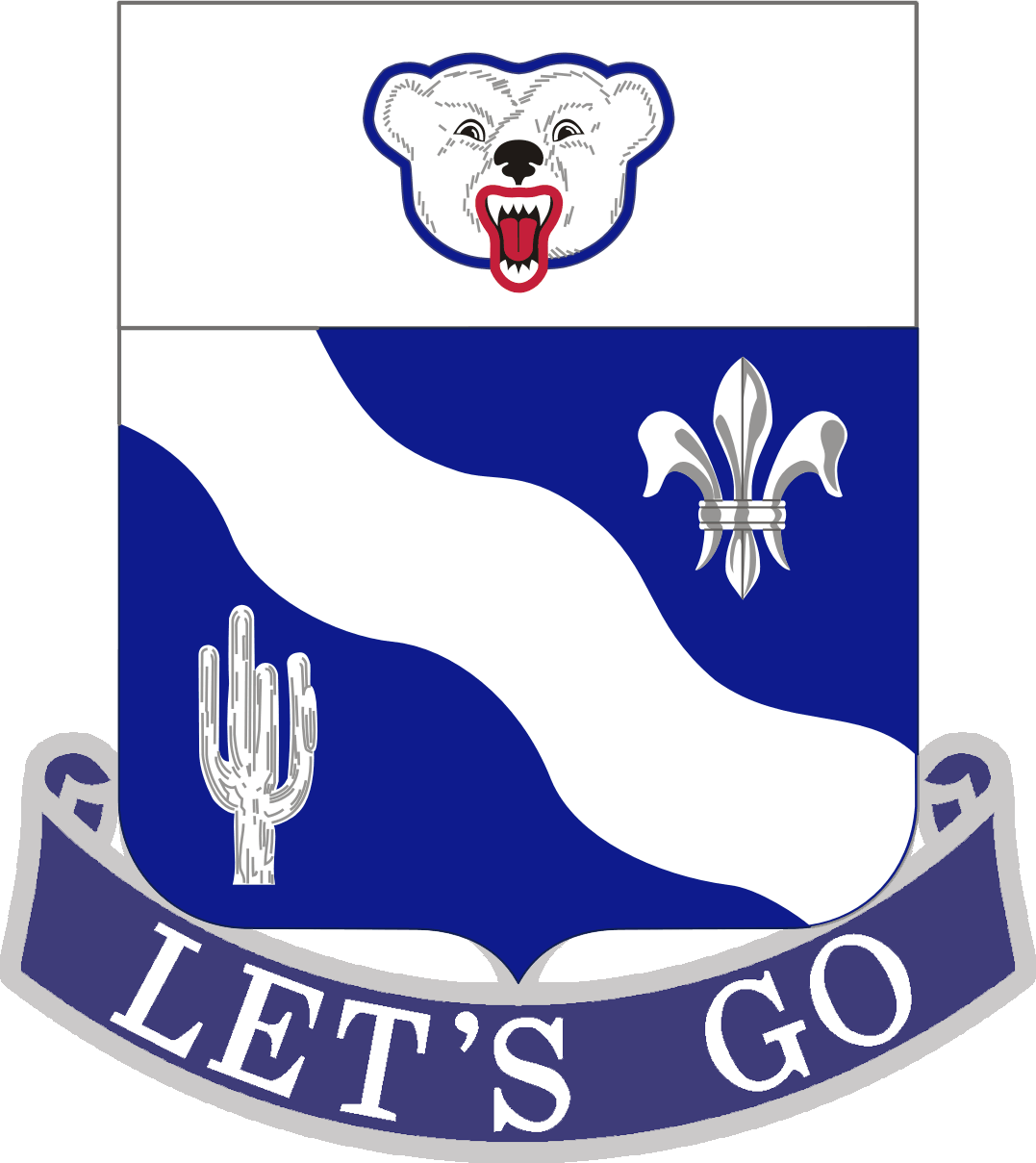
LTC E. Franklin Montgomery

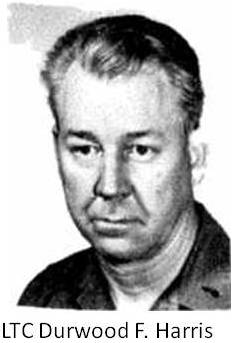
LTC Durwood F. Harris

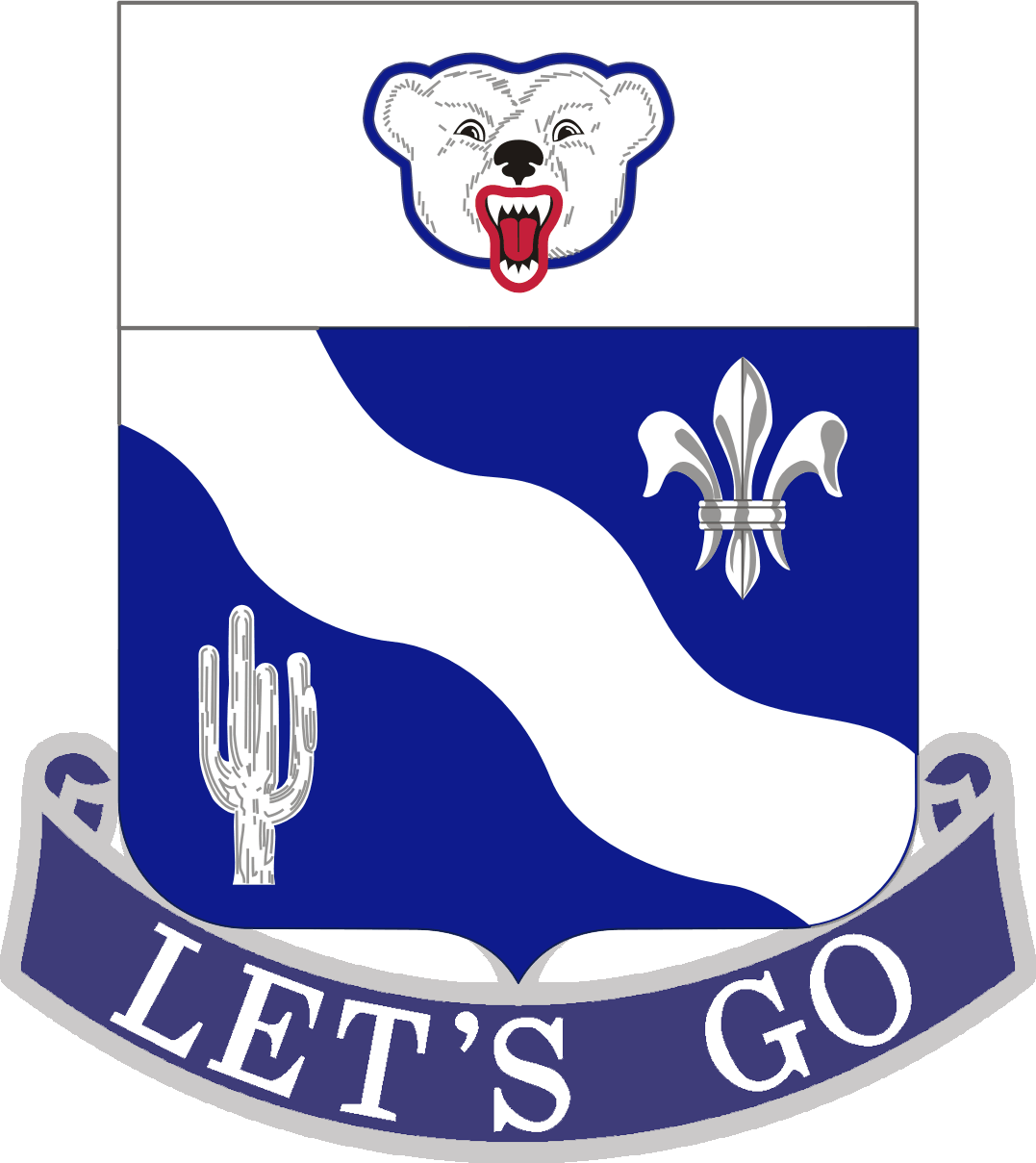
LTC James D. Anderson

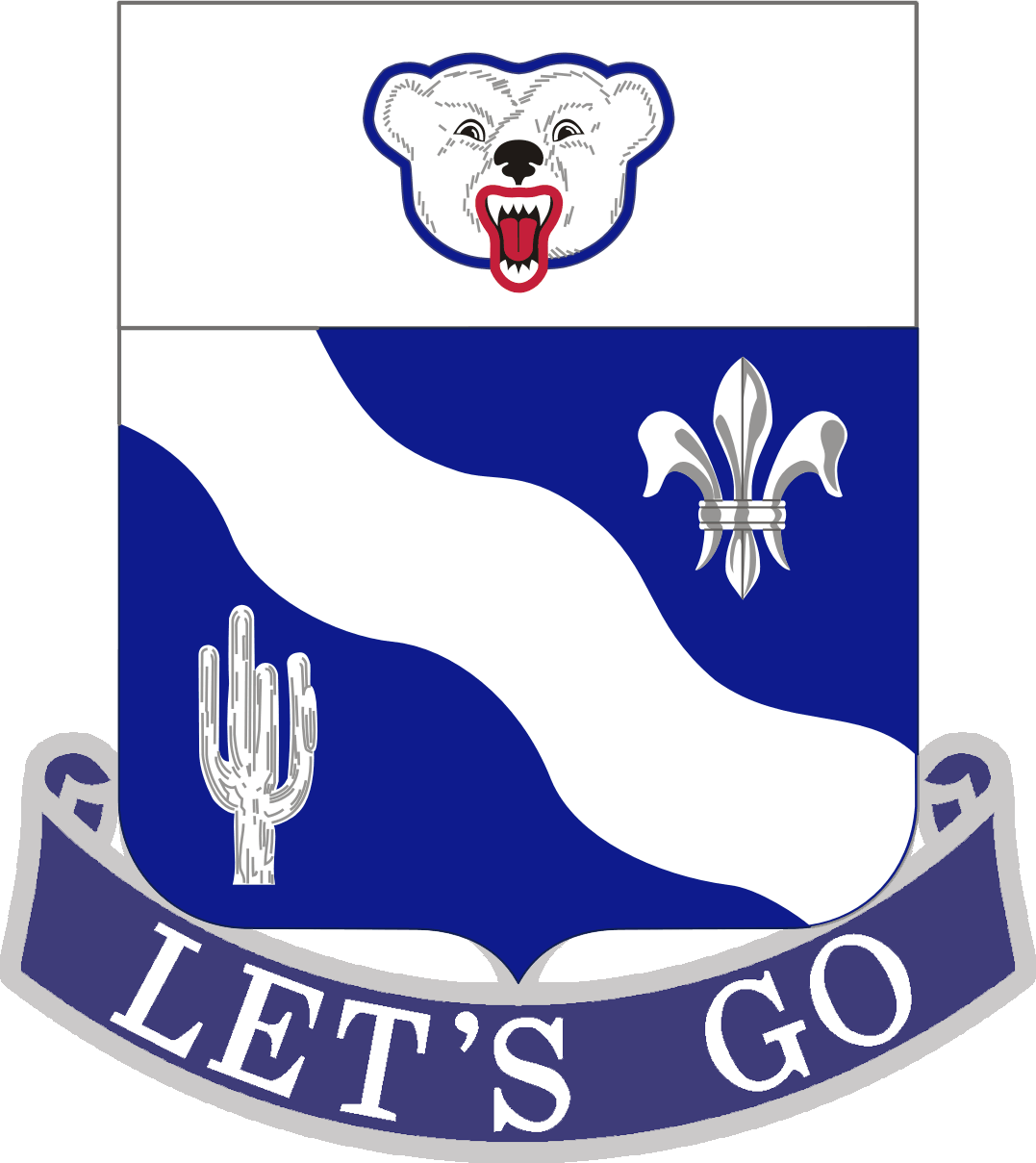
LTC Edgar B. Sharp Jr.

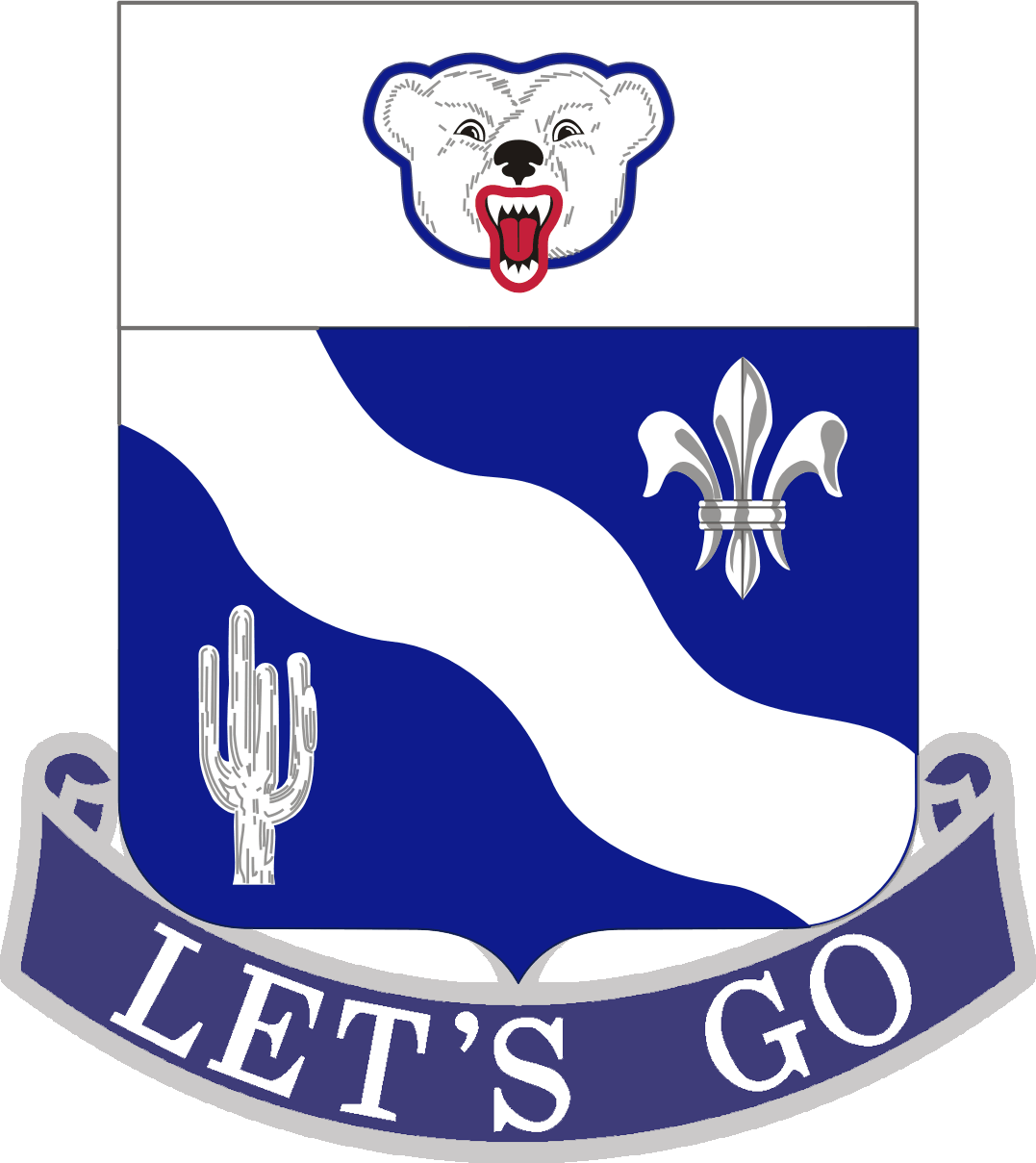
LTC William F. Sherman

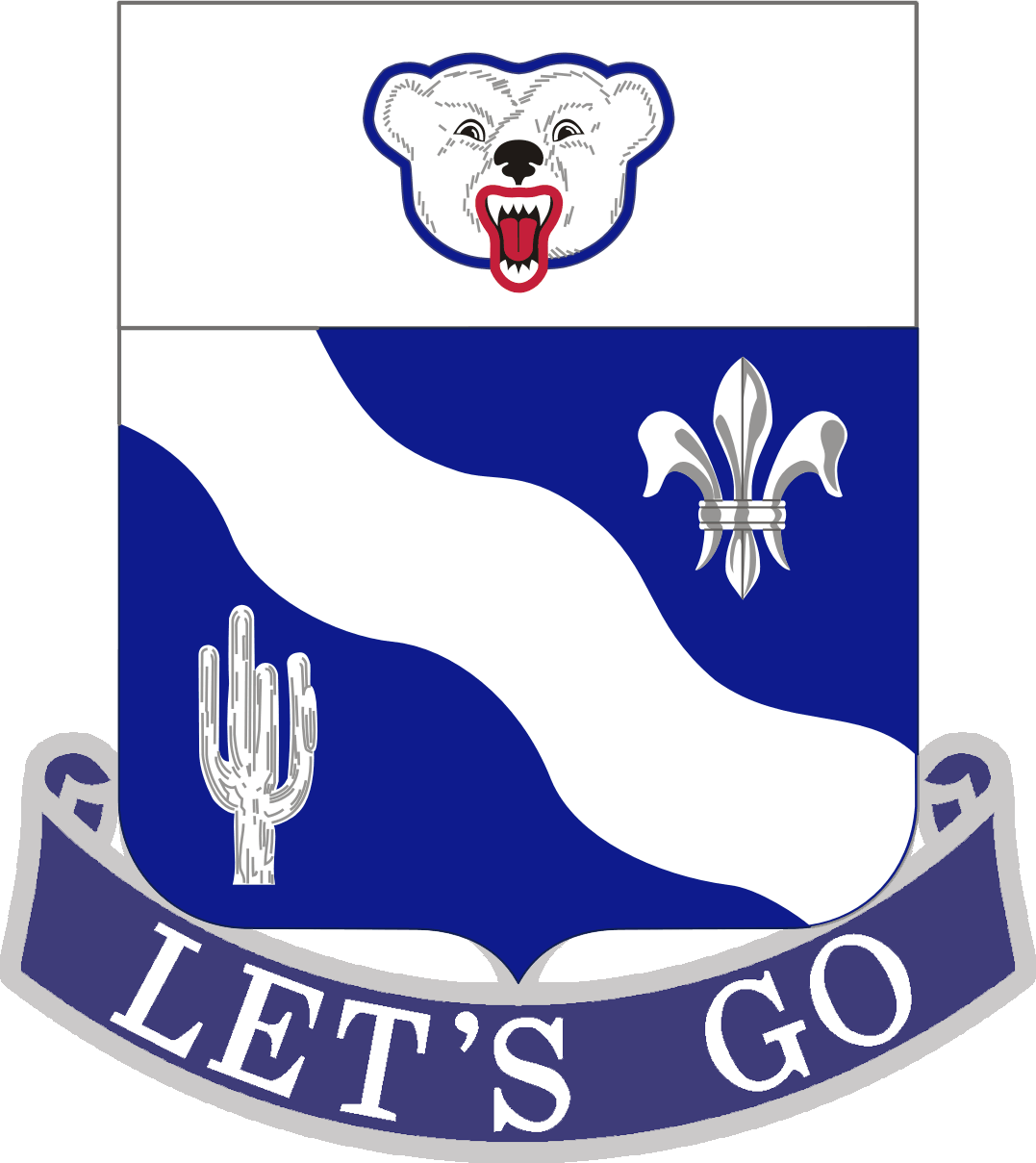
LTC James H. Long

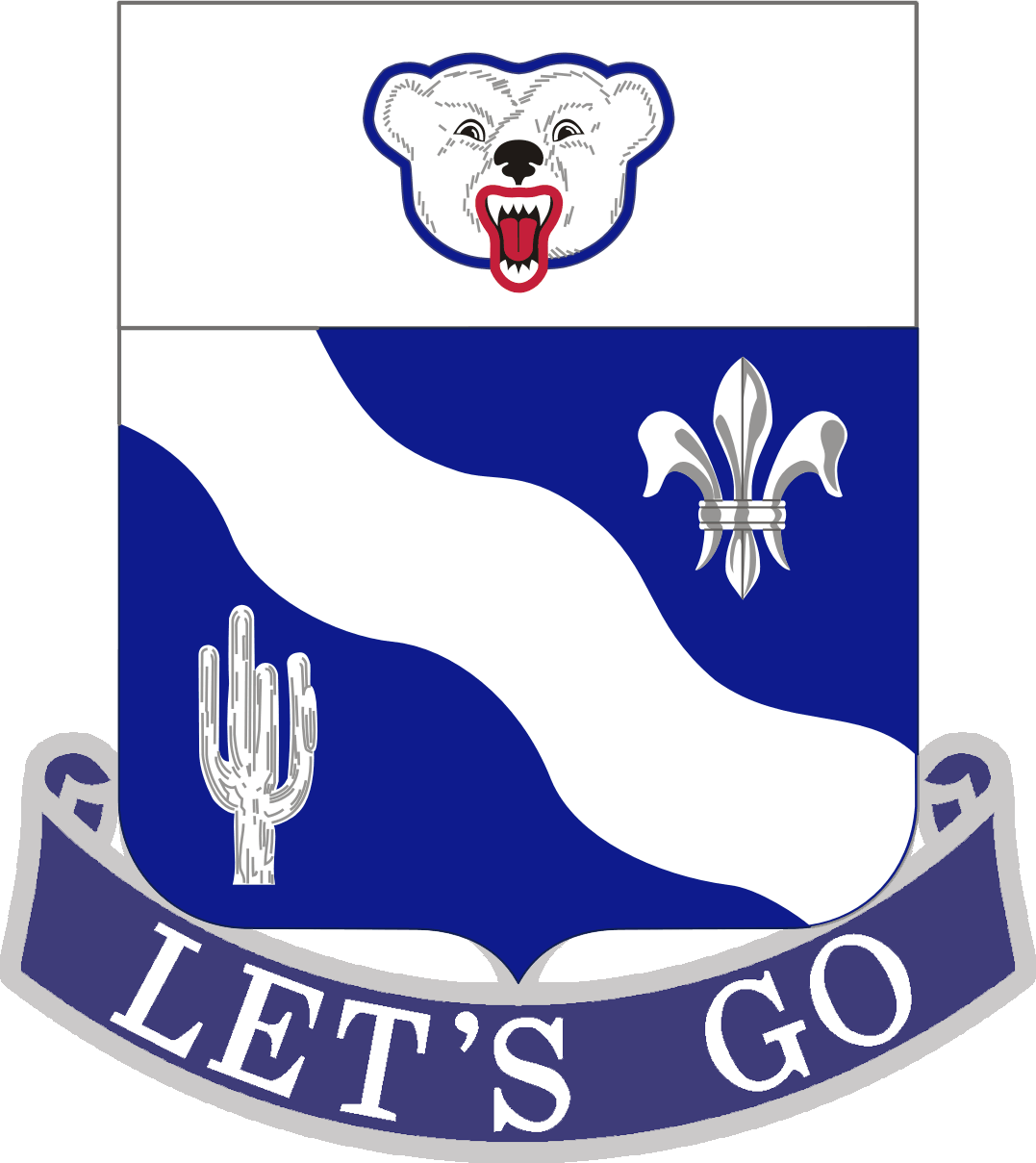
LTC Billy D. Paige

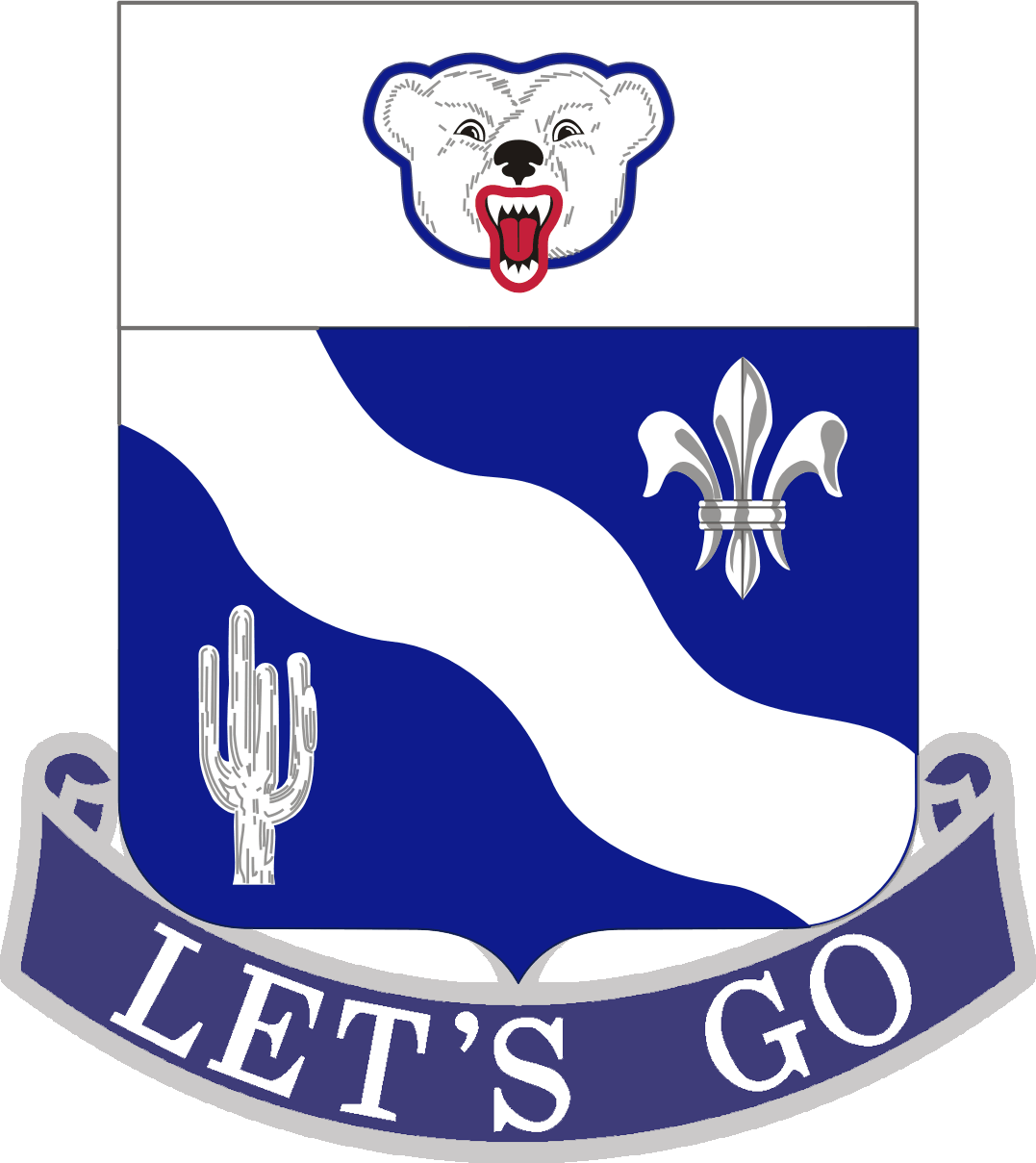
LTC Billy F. Gualt

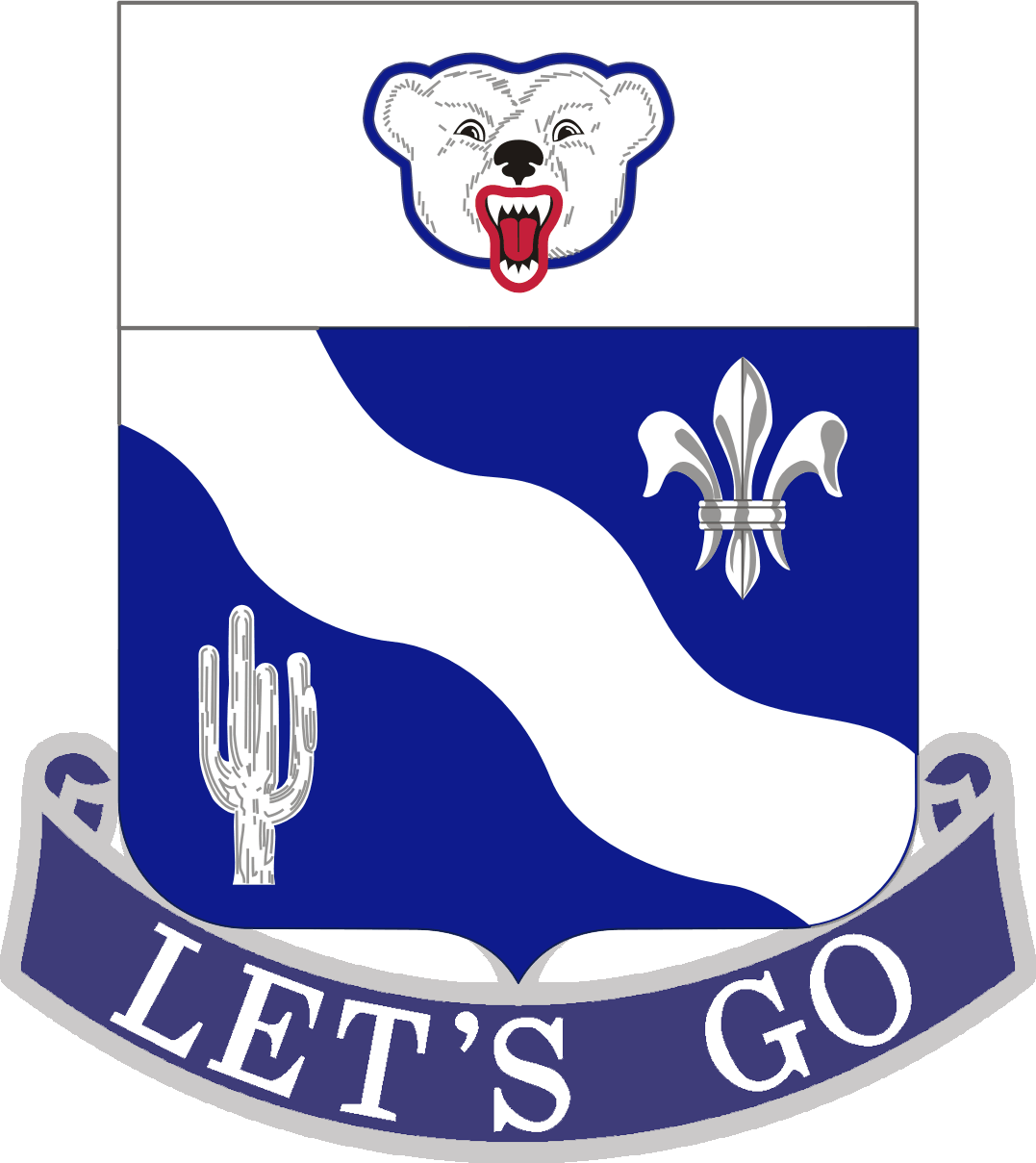
LTC William D. Young

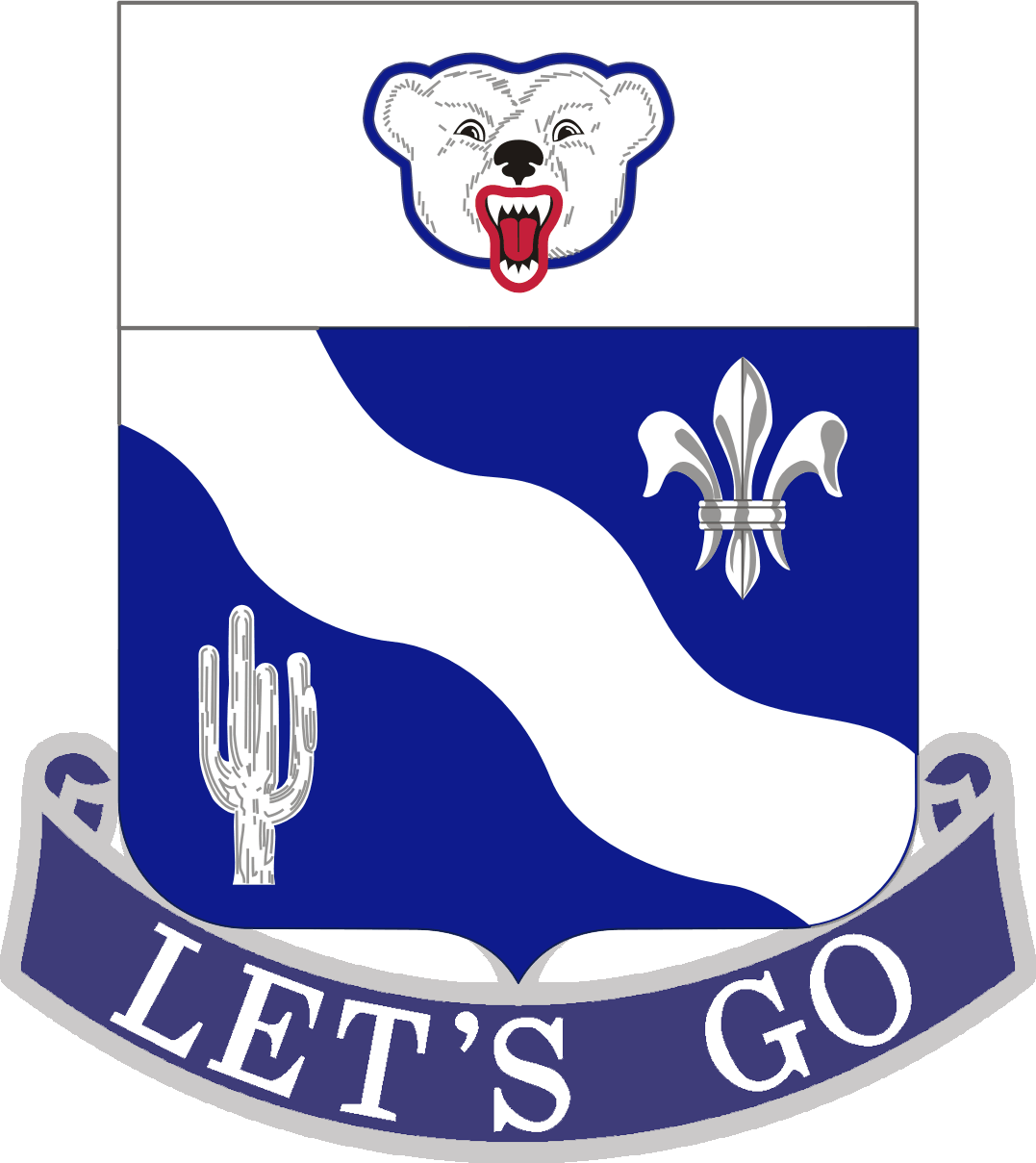
LTC Lawrence M. Stewart

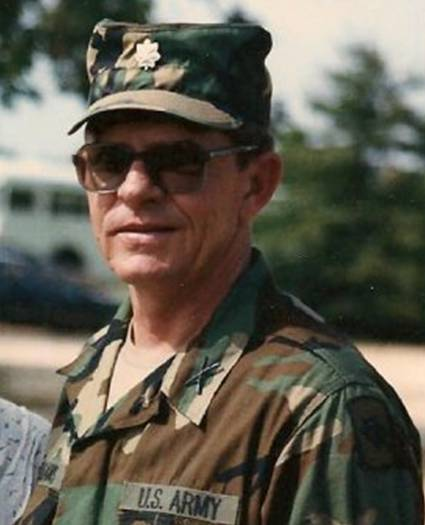
LTC Alvin R. Williams

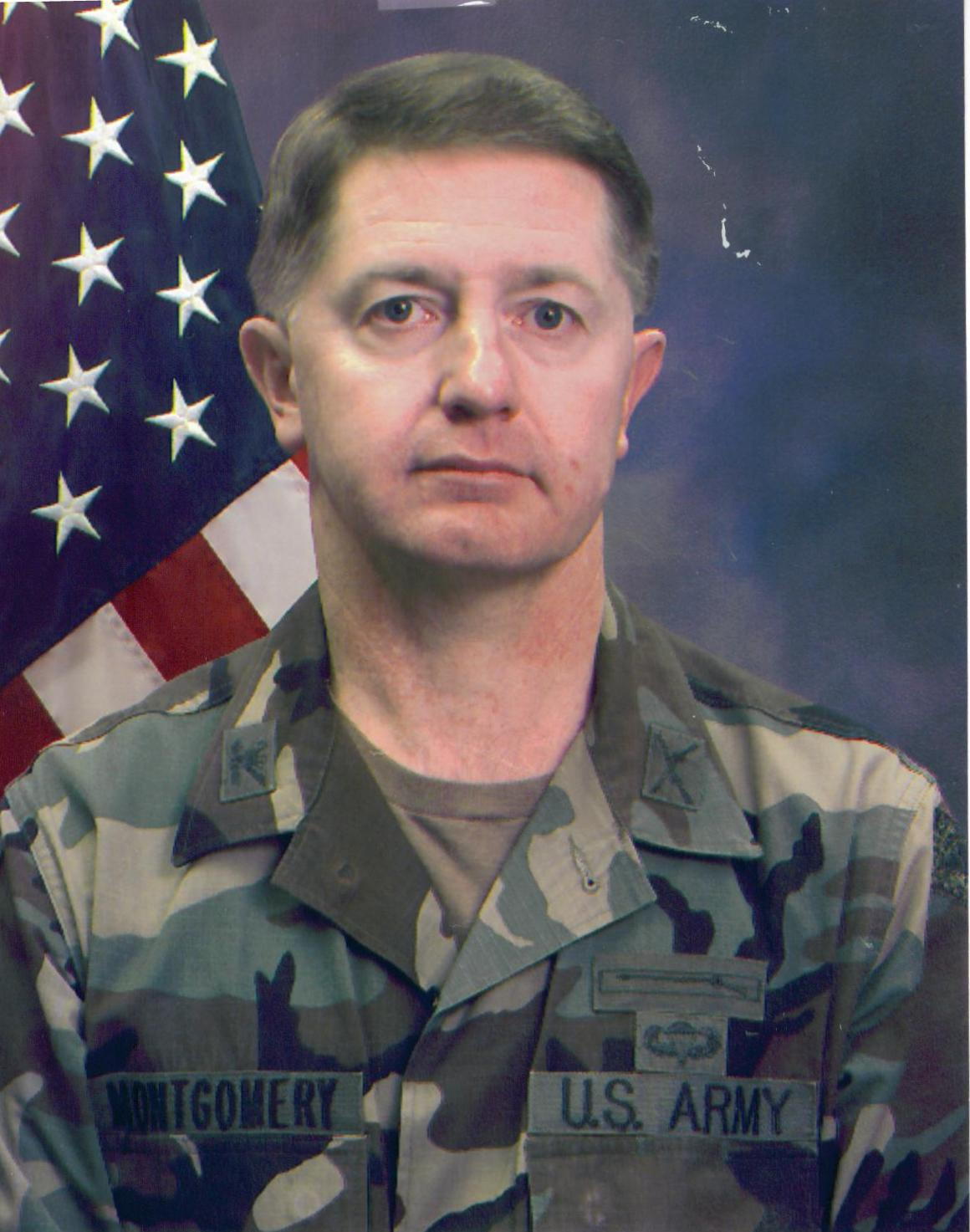
LTC James H. Montgomery

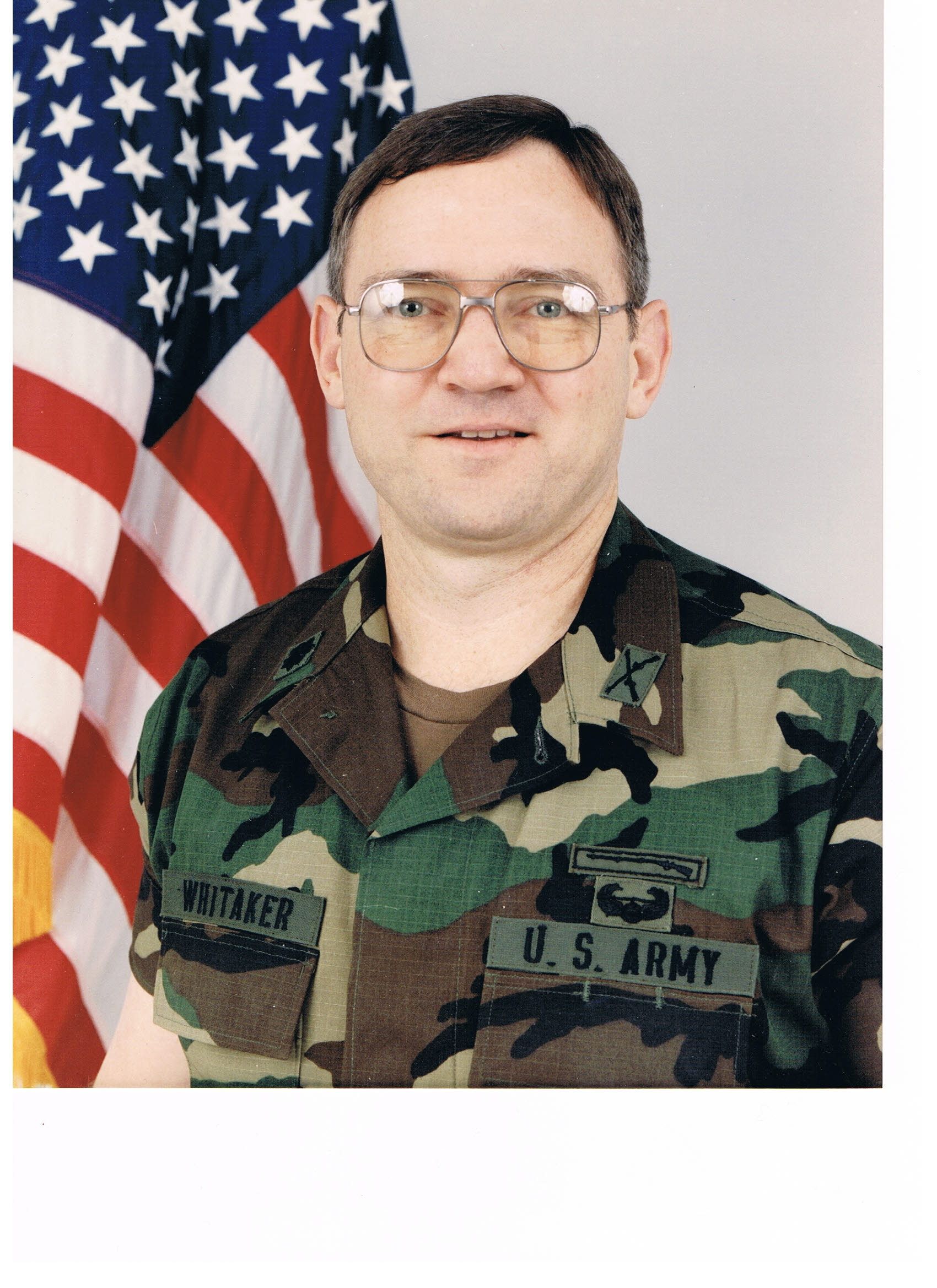
LTC Edward W. "Bo" Whitaker Jr.

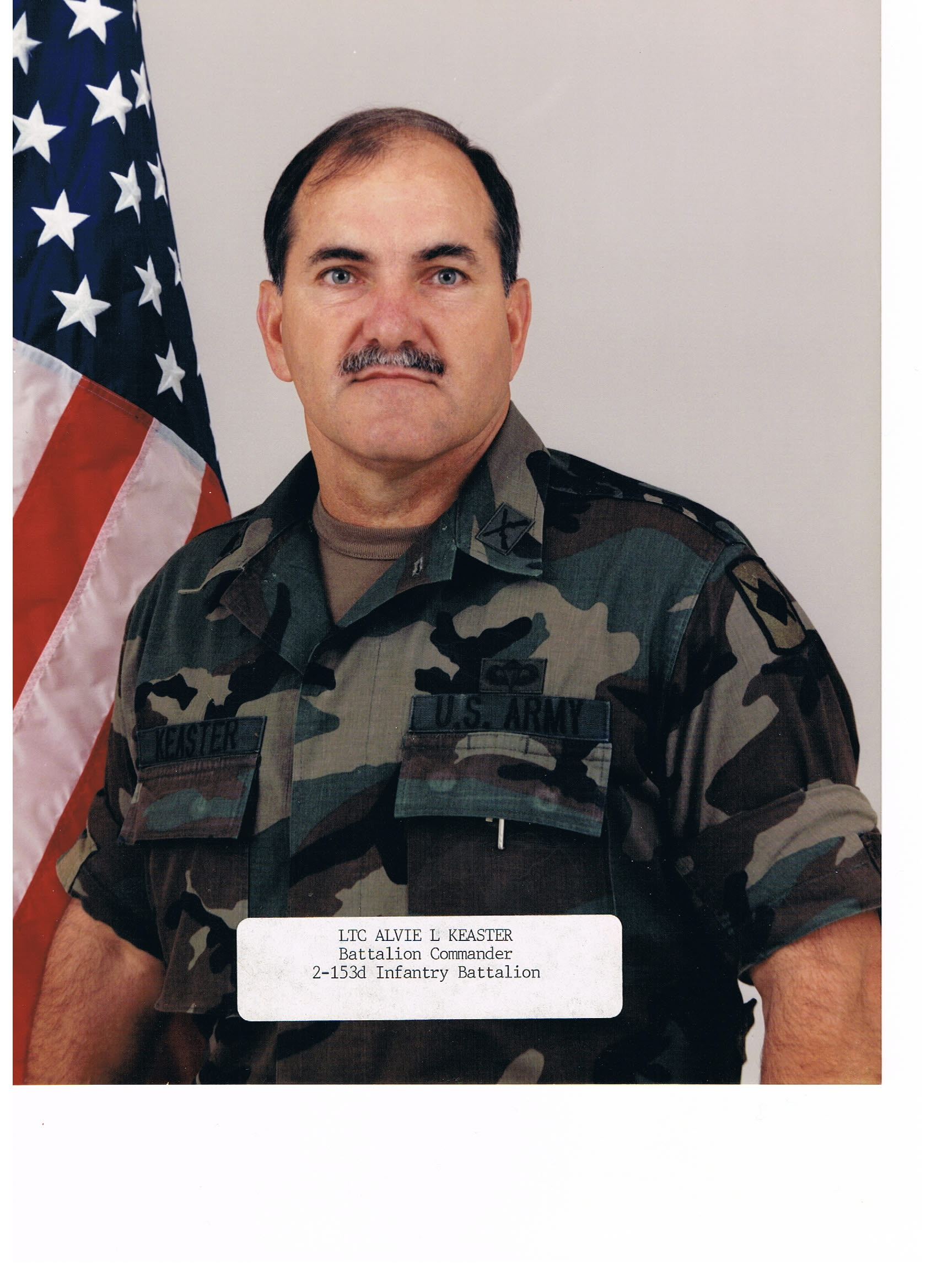
LTC Alvie L. Keaster

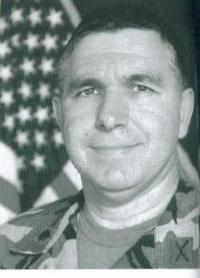
LTC Roger L. McCellan

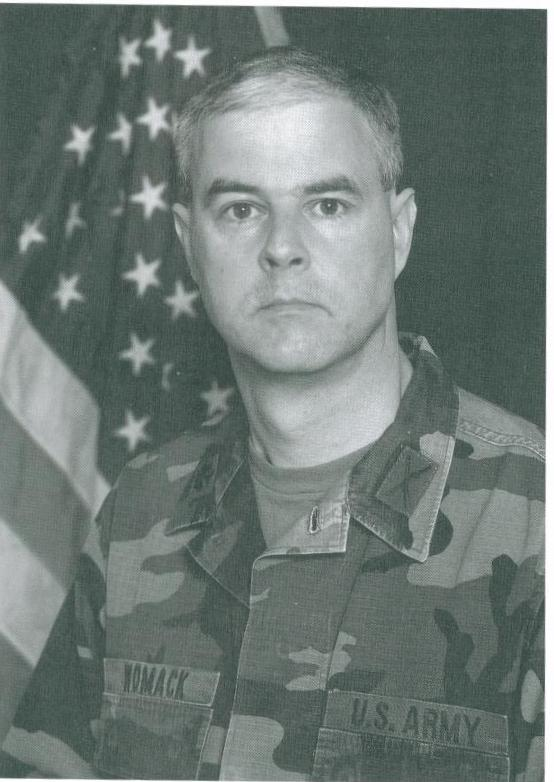
LTC Stephen A. Womack

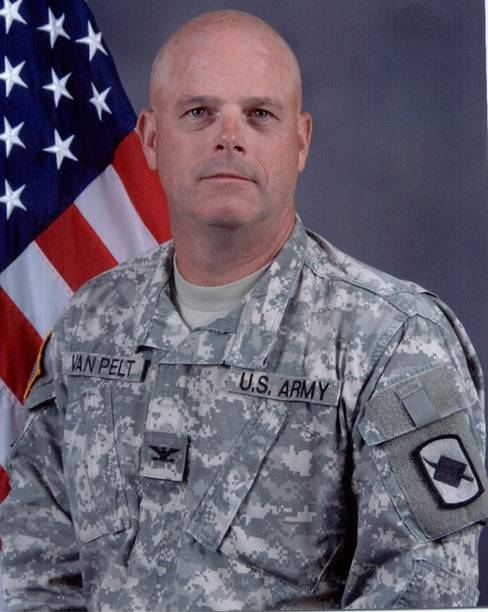
LTC Kirk E. Van Pelt

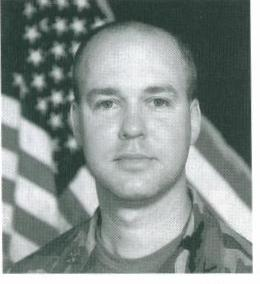
LTC Cary A. Shillcutt

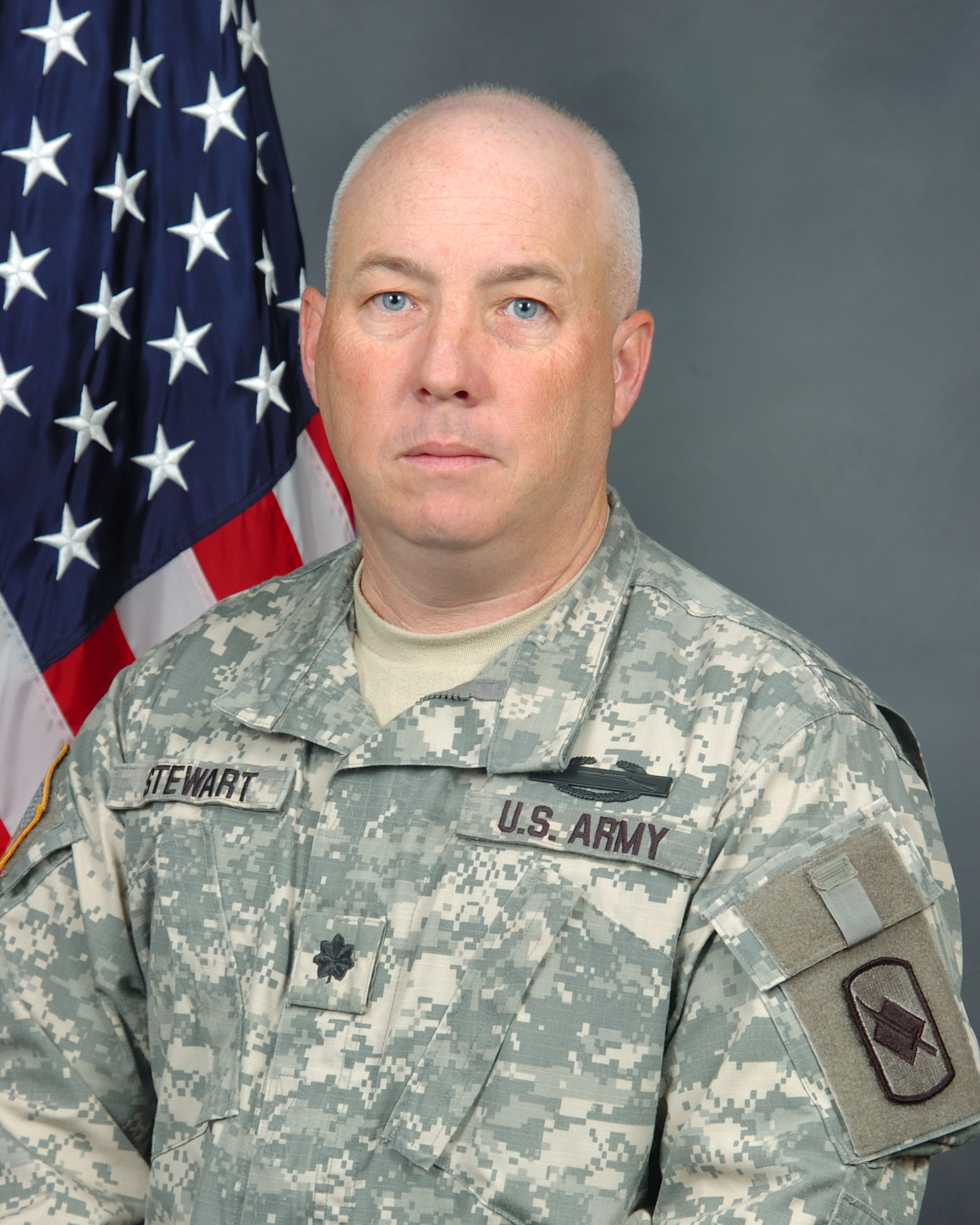
LTC John M. "Mickey" Stewart

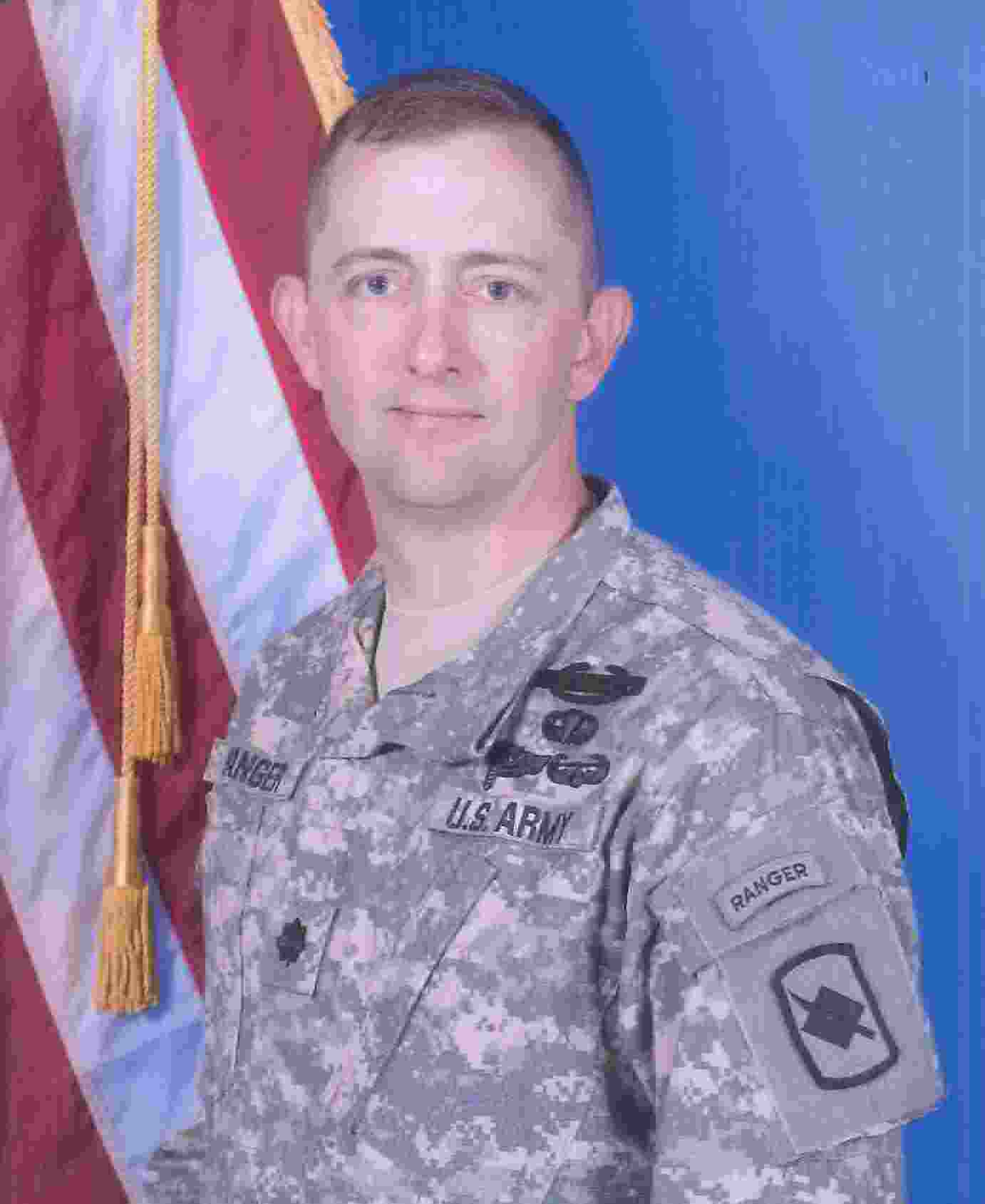
LTC Christopher S. Stanger

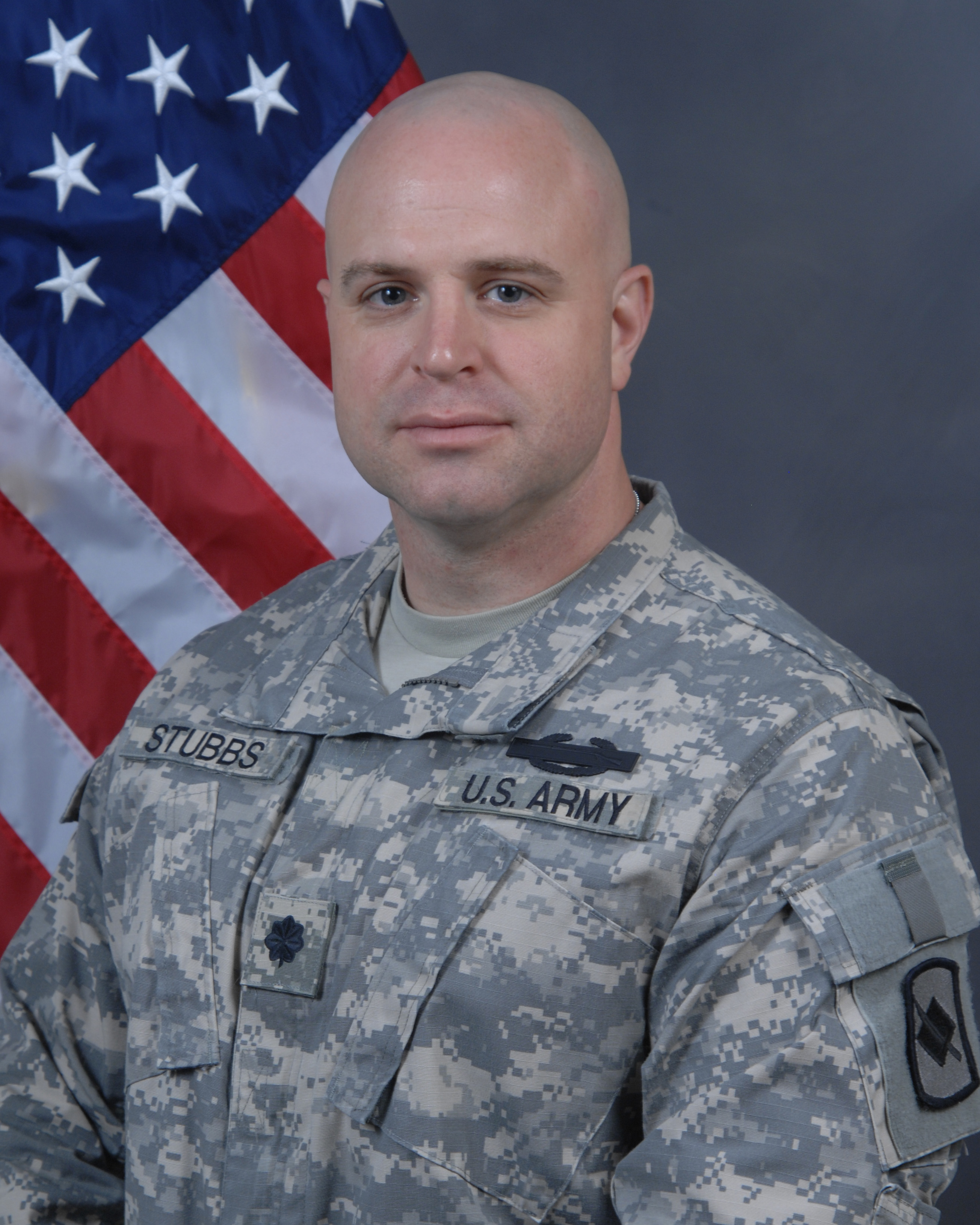
LTC Jonathan M. Stubbs

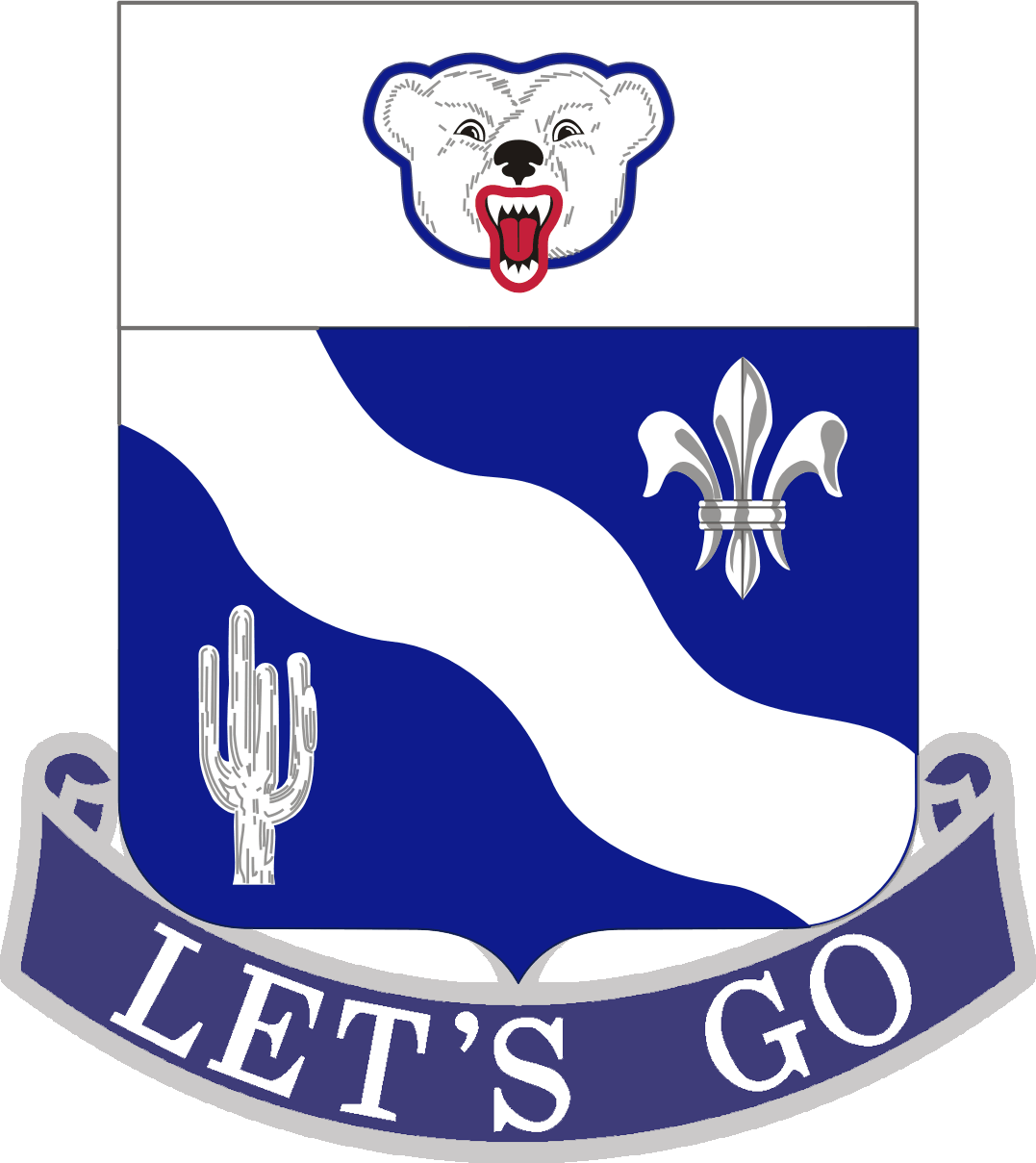
LTC Todd A. Spafford

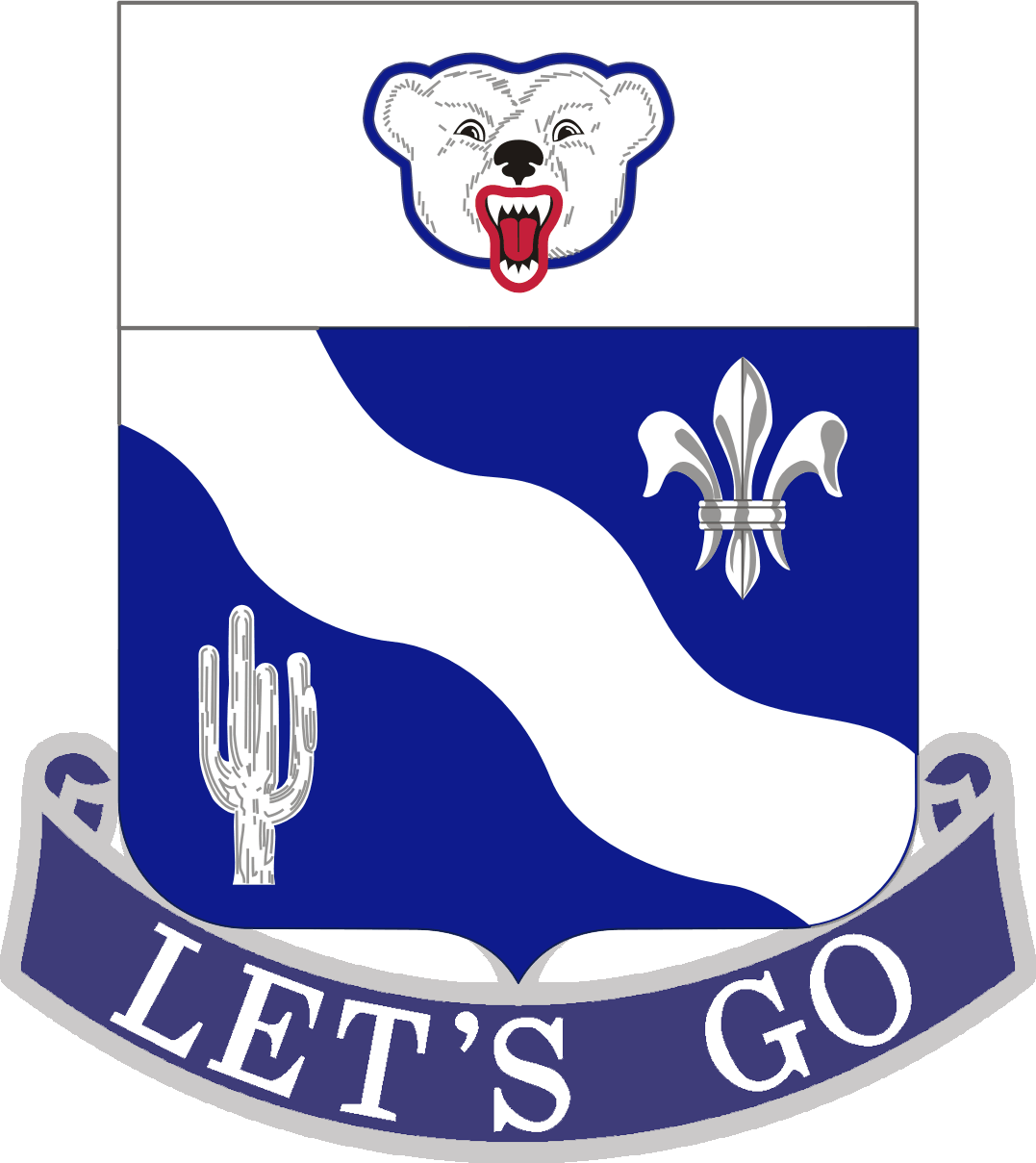
LTC Olen C. Bridges

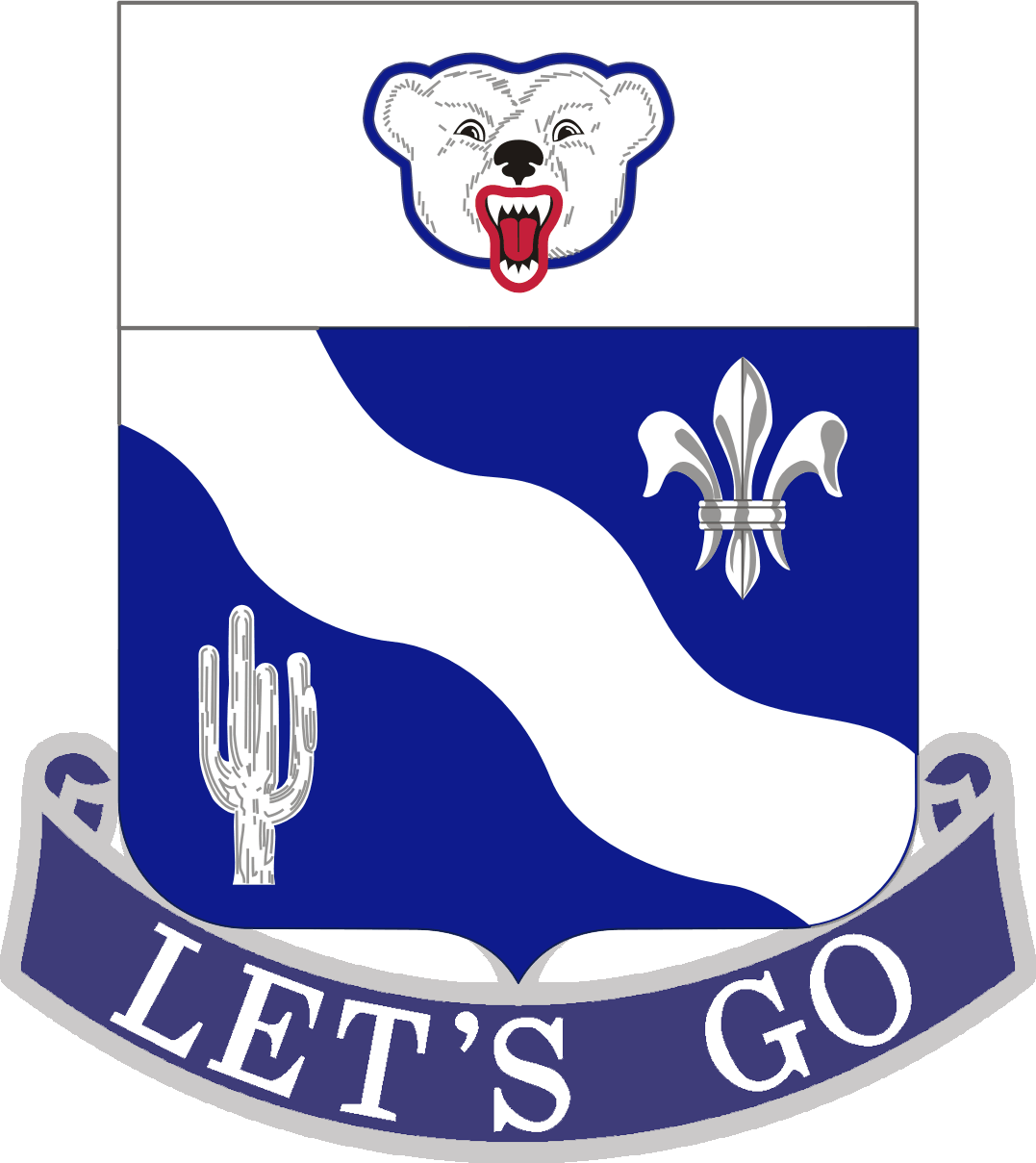
LTC Slade A. McPherson

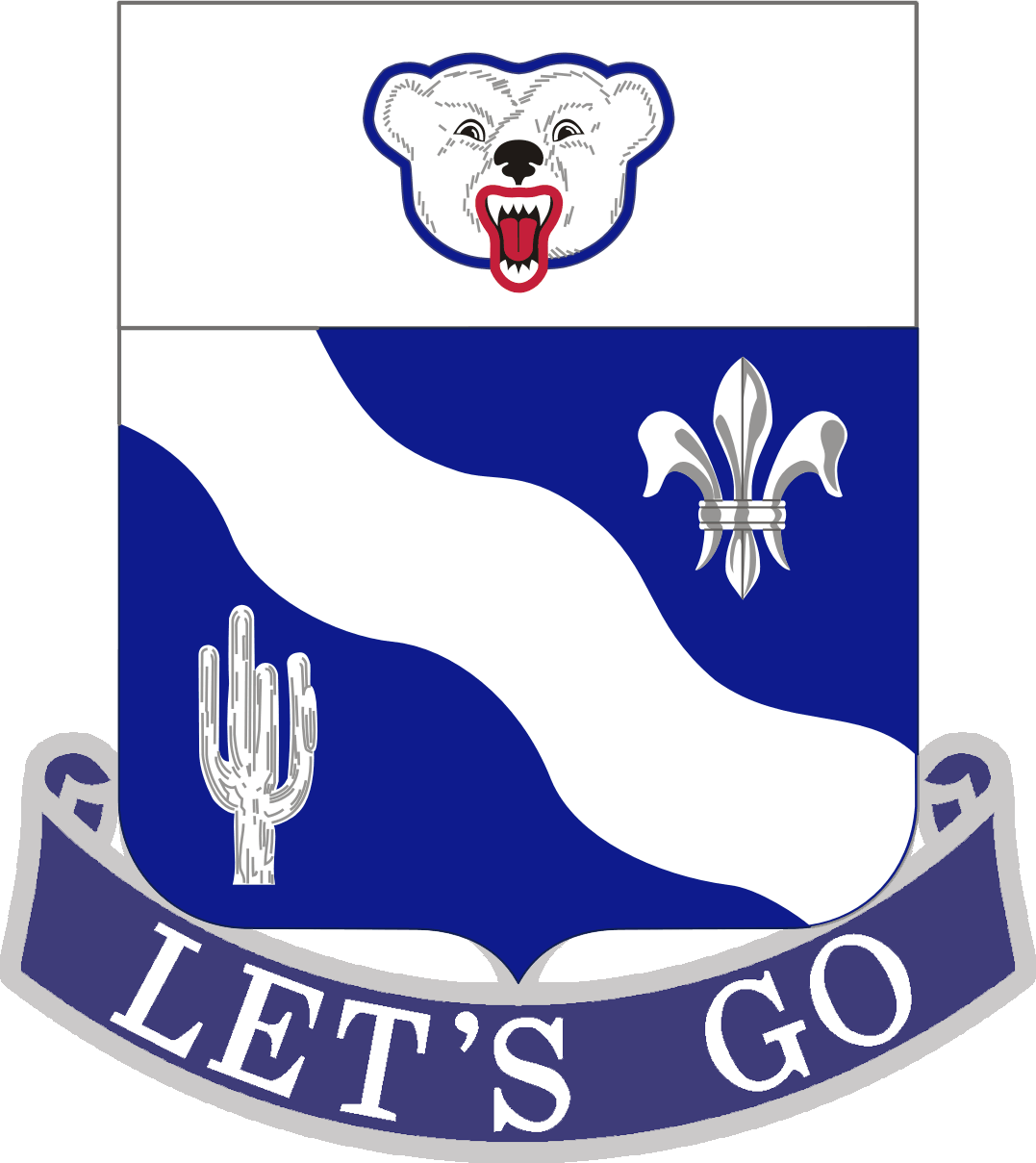
LTC Harold D. Williams

== Current unit locations ==
Unit	Station
Headquarters and Headquarters Company	Searcy
Company A (-)	Harrison
Detachment 1, Company A	Walnut Ridge
Company B (-)	Batesville
Detachment 1, Company B	Augusta
Company C (-)	West Memphis
Detachment 1, Company C	Forrest City
Company D	Beebe

== 153rd Infantry heraldry ==
=== Distinctive unit insignia ===
A silver color metal and enamel device 1 1/8 inches (2.9 cm) in height overall consisting of a shield blazoned: Azure, a bend wavy between a fleur-de-lis and a giant cactus Argent; on a chief of the last a Great Bear's face of the like fimbriated of the first, lips and tongue Gules. Attached below the shield is a blue motto scroll inscribed "LET'S GO" in silver letters.

Symbolism: The shield is blue for Infantry. The wavy bend, representing the Arkansas River, refers to the geographic location of the regiment. The cactus symbolizes service on the Mexican border and the fleur-de-lis service in France during World War I. The Great Bear's face from the shoulder sleeve insignia of the Alaskan Department symbolizes service in that area in World War II.

Background: The distinctive unit insignia was originally approved for the 153d Regiment infantry on 6 January 1930. It was amended on 30 June 1930. On 4 June 1951 the insignia was amended to show additional war service.

=== Coat of arms ===
Blazon: Shield: Azure, a bend wavy between a fleur-de-lis and a giant cactus Argent; on a chief of the last a Great Bear's face of the like fimbriated of the first, lips and tongue Gules.

Crest: That for the regiments of the Arkansas National Guard: On a wreath of the colors (Argent and Azure) above two sprays of apple blossoms Proper a diamond Argent charged with four mullets Azure, one in upper point and three in lower, within a bordure of the last bearing twenty-five mullets of the second.

Symbolism: The shield is blue for Infantry. The wavy bend, representing the Arkansas River, refers to the geographic location of the regiment. The cactus symbolizes service on the Mexican border and the fleur-de-lis service in France during World War I. The Great Bear's face from the shoulder sleeve insignia of the Alaskan Department symbolizes service in that area in World War II.

Background: The coat of arms was originally approved for the 153d Regiment Infantry on 6 January 1930. It was amended on 4 June 1951 to show additional war service.

== See also ==
- 1st Battalion, 153rd Infantry Regiment
- 3rd Battalion, 153rd Infantry Regiment
- Arkansas State Guard and the Spanish-American War
- Arkansas National Guard during World War I
- Arkansas National Guard and World War II
- Arkansas Army National Guard and the Cold War
