= Arkansas National Guard and World War II =

The history of the Arkansas National Guard and World War II begins with the reorganization following World War I. The State first reorganized a provision unit, the 5th Arkansas, in order to provide a force to deal with domestic situations. As the Defense Department slowly implemented the massive changes and expansions outlined National Defense Act of 1916, the Arkansas National Guard was allowed to reorganize its war time units, including the 153rd Infantry Regiment, the 141st Machine Gun Battalion, and the 142nd Field Artillery. The Guard acquired its first permanent facilities and additional training during its annual encampments. During World War II, the entire Arkansas National Guard was activated and units saw duty in the Pacific and European theaters of conflict.

== Re-organization following WWI ==
The effort to rapidly reorganize the Arkansas National Guard following World War I was a complicated task for two reasons, first the fact that the units mobilized for the war had effectively been disbanded at the end of the war and second because Federal Authorities were focused on a massive expansion of the National Guard.

=== Provisional reorganization ===
The state requested authority from the Militia Bureau (predecessor of today's National Guard Bureau) for authority to disband the paper organizations of the 4th Arkansas Infantry and the 1st Arkansas Engineer Battalion. This was accomplished in February 1920.

However, as it became clear that the mobilized units would not simply revert to state control, the state petitioned the War Department to be able to fill the state's quota of National Guard Soldiers by establishing several new units, in order to provide the governor with units to respond in case of an emergency:

- 5th Regiment, Arkansas Infantry
- 2nd Battalion, Arkansas Engineers
- 2nd Arkansas Ambulance Company

A proclamation was issued by the Governor on 7 November 1919, calling upon every county and city to co-operation in the organizing of at least one National Guard Company in each county. A campaign was launched in January 1920 by bringing the Regimental Commander and a group of officers and enlisted soldiers who toured through 64 of the state's largest cities to raise awareness and support of the National Guard.

Under as a result of this campaign, the following units were authorized to expand the new 5th Arkansas Infantry:

- Machine Gun Company, Fifth Arkansas Infantry, stationed at Pine Bluff, was given Federal Recognition on 31 July 1920.
- Supply Company, 5th Infantry was authorized to be formed at Fort Smith.
- A Band Section under the Headquarters of the 5th Infantry was authorized at Pine Bluff.
- Company A, 5th Arkansas Infantry was organized at Hope.

Infantry companies were also authorized at the following cities.

- Arkadelphia
- Batesville
- Beebe, with a detached platoon at McRea
- Blue Mountain, with a detached Platoon at Plainview
- Blytheville
- Booneville, with a detached platoon at Magazine
- Camden
- Earle
- Eureka Springs
- Heber Springs
- Magnolia
- Marianna
- Helena
- Marshall
- Prescott
- Rison
- Russellville
- Texarkana
- Warren

=== Implementation of the National Defense Act of 1916 ===
A key piece of Federal Legislation governing the organization of the National Guard had been passed during the buildup to World War I. The National Defense Act of 1916 provided for an expanded army during peace and wartime, fourfold expansion of the National Guard, the creation of an Officers' and an Enlisted Reserve Corps, plus the creation of a Reserve Officers' Training Corps in colleges and universities. The act clarified the authority of the President, in case of war or national emergency, to mobilize the National Guard for the duration of the emergency. The act was passed amidst the "preparedness controversy", a brief frenzy of great public concern over the state of preparation of the United States armed forces, and shortly after Poncho Villa's cross-border raid on Columbus, New Mexico. It authorized an army of 175,000 men, a National Guard of 450,000 men. The Act represented the settlement of a debate that had raged over whether the Nation need a large professional standing army, like the European powers or whether national defense should be provided with a smaller standing regular army, supplemented in time of war by a strong well organized National Guard.

While the act was utilized to mobilize the entire National Guard for the Mexican Expedition and World War I, the massive expansion of the National Guard which it authorized had not yet been implemented before the outbreak of the war. This meant that while the state authorities were focused on how to reconstitute the Arkansas National Guard, the Federal Authorities were planning the expansion of the National Guard from a force of 110,000 during the Mexican Expedition to the 450,000 man force authorized by the Act. From 1920 to 1922 various meetings were conducted at the state and regional level to determine what troops and units would be allotted to the Arkansas National Guard.

=== Re-Constitution of 153rd Infantry Regiment and the 141st Machine Gun Battalion ===
By 1921 the state had been authorized to reconstitute its war time units. The 5th Arkansas Infantry was reorganized as the 153rd Infantry and the 141st Machine Gun battalion. The 153rd Infantry was stationed as follows:

Headquarters	Company	Station	Federal recognition
153 Infantry Regiment	HHC, 153rd IN	Russellville	January 28, 1926
	Service Company	Searcy, Arkansas	July 2, 1924
	Band Section, Svc Company	Conway, Arkansas	November 13, 1923
	Howitzer Company	Mena, Arkansas	October 25, 1921
	Medical Detachment	Prescott, Arkansas	January 12, 1923
1st Battalion, 153 Infantry Regiment	Headquarters, 1-153rd In	Hope, Arkansas	October 25, 1921
	Headquarters Company, 1-153rd IN	Ashdown, Arkansas	December 14, 1923
	Company A, 1-153 IN	Hope, Arkansas	December 30, 1920
	Company B, 1-153 IN	Magnolia, Arkansas	March 29, 1921
	Company C, 1-153 IN	Prescott, Arkansas	February 21, 1921
	Company D, 1-153 IN	Pine Bluff, Arkansas	July 31, 1920
2nd Battalion, 153 Infantry Regiment	Headquarters	Little Rock, Arkansas	June 25, 1921
	Headquarters Company, 2-153 IN	Conway, Arkansas	January 27, 1926
	Company E, 2-153 IN	Clarksville, Arkansas	February 25, 1921
	Company F, 2-153 IN	Dardanelle, Arkansas	April 28, 1923
	Company G, 2-153 IN	Conway, Arkansas	April 21, 1921
	Company H, 2-153 IN	Forrest City, Arkansas	May 25, 1921
3rd Battalion, 153 Infantry Regiment	Headquarters, 3-153 IN	Cotton Plant, Arkansas	July 1, 1921
	Headquarters Company, 3-153 IN	Beebe, Arkansas	June 25, 1921
	Company I, 3-153 IN	Cotton Plant, Arkansas	March 15, 1921
	Company K, 3-153 IN	Lonoke, Arkansas	June 23, 1923
	Company L, 3-153 IN	Batesville, Arkansas	October 2, 1924
	Company M, 3-153 IN Command	Blytheville, Arkansas	May 8, 1921

The 141st Machine Gun Battalion (Anti-Aircraft) was reorganized in the Arkansas National Guard with units stationed as follows:

Unit	Station	Federal recognition dates
Headquarters Battery	Nashville	June 21, 1921
Battery E	Heber Springs	June 7, 1921
Battery F	Blue Mountain	June 11, 1921
Battery G	Fort Smith	June 23, 1921
Battery H	Little Rock	June 24, 1921

=== Creation of the 206th Coast Artillery ===
In 1923, The Arkansas National Guard was allocated a new organization, the 206th Coast Artillery (Anti Aircraft). The unit resulted form the reorganization and re-designation of the 141st Machine Gun Battalion (Anti Aircraft). The 141st was incorporated into the new unit as the 2nd Battalion, 206th Coast Artillery (Anti Aircraft). The newly formed 206th Coast Artillery took its coat of arms from Chaumont, one of the principal towns in the Department of Haute-Marne, France, where the 141st Machine Gun Battalion was stationed during World War I.

The 206th Coast Artillery (AA) was initially stationed as follows:

Unit	Station	Federal recognition dates
Headquarters	Marianna	November 23, 1923
Headquarters Battery	Marianna	November 23, 1923
Service Battery	Harrison	December 3, 1923
Band Section, Service Battery	Marianna	June 24, 1921
Medical Department Detachment	Fort Smith	December 18, 1924
Headquarters Detachment and Combat Train, 1st Battalion	El Dorado	November 8, 1923
Battery A	Fayetteville	December 4, 1923
Battery B	Monticello	October 16, 1923
Battery C	Jonesboro	October 19, 1923
Battery D	Russellville	October 23, 1923
Headquarters Detachment and Combat Train, 2nd Battalion	Nashville	June 21, 1921
Battery E	Heber Springs	June 7, 1921
Battery F	Russellville	January 26, 1925
Battery G	Fort Smith	May 26, 1924
Battery H	Little Rock	June 24, 1921

=== Medical units ===
The following hospital units were created during the post-World War I expansion:

Unit	Station	Federal recognition dates
Hospital Company Number 216	Hot Springs	September 15, 1922
Ambulance Company Number 216	Carlisle, Arkansas	June 23, 1923

=== Army Air Corps ===
The state was allocated and Observation Squadron, which assumed to designation of the 154 to continue the history of the 154th Infantry, which had been organized during World War I from the former 3rd Arkansas Infantry. The 154th Observation Squadron was organized at Little Rock and federally recognized on October 24, 1925.

=== Re-Constitution of the 142nd Field Artillery ===
On June 16, 1931, the state was authorized to reconstitute the 142nd Field Artillery. Several of the new 142nd batteries were organized from the 206th Coast Artillery.

New unit	Former unit	Station	Federal recognition dates
Headquarters, 1st Battalion, 142nd FA	New Unit	Prescott	June 26, 1931
Headquarters Battery and Combat Train	New Unit	Haze	June 26, 1931
Battery A	Battery H, 206th CA	Fayetteville	September 2, 1931
Battery B	Battery E, 206th CA	Fayetteville	September 2, 1931
Battery C	Battery G, 206th CA	Fort Smith	April 20, 1936
Medical Detachment	New Unit	Hot Springs	June 26, 1931

On April 3, 1936, the war department authorize the creation of the 2nd Battalion, 142nd Field Artillery as follows:

New unit	Former unit	Station	Federal recognition dates
Headquarters, 2nd Battalion, 142nd FA	New Unit	Hot Springs	April 3, 1936
Headquarters Battery and Combat Train	New Unit	Fort Smith	June 26, 1931
Battery C	New Unit	Mena	June 26, 1931
Medical Detachment	New Unit	Fort Smith	June 26, 1931

On March 6, 1937, the War Department authorized the creation the following additional units for the 142nd Field Artillery Regiment:

New unit	Former unit	Station	Federal recognition dates
Headquarters, 3rd Battalion, 142nd FA	New Unit	Fayetteville	March 6, 1937
Battery E	New Unit	Paris	March 6, 1937
Battery F	New Unit	Rogers	March 6, 1937
Service Battery	New Unit	Harrison	March 6, 1937
Band Section	New Unit	Fort Smith	March 6, 1937

== Improved facilities and training ==
During the period between the World Wars, the Arkansas National Guard acquired its first permanent facilities. The Guard also received improved training at its annual encampments.

=== Armory construction ===
Until the reorganization following World War I, the state owned no armories. A proclamation was issued by Governor Charles Brough on 7 November 1919 appealing to all county and city officials to co-operate in the building of at least one "Memorial Community Armory Building" in each county in honor of World War I veterans. The first of the new armories was built in 1926, and by 1940, the state owned a total of 25 Armories located in the following cities:

- Batesville
- Blytheville
- Clarksville
- Conway
- Dardanelle
- Fayetteville
- Forrest City
- Fort Smith
- Harrison
- Hazen
- Helena
- Jonesboro
- Magnolia
- Marianna
- Mena
- Monticello
- Newport
- Paris
- Pine Bluff
- Prescott
- Rogers
- Russellville
- Searcy
- Texarkana

=== Camp Pike transferred to the Arkansas National Guard ===
The state had acquired Camp Pike, the U.S. Army Installation that had been built for World War I. The Secretary of War granted the state a revocable license for the camp, which was accepted by Governor Thomas C. McRae on December 22, 1922. The camp was turned over to the Camp Pike Honorary Commission which liquidated surplus Federal government property left at the Camp, raising approximately $250,000. These funds were utilized to new buildings and to provide for maintenance and up keep of the facilities. The commission also built a water tank and established a target range with funds from the sale. The Camp would eventually be renamed in honor of Arkansas Senator Joseph T. Robinson.

=== Training opportunities ===
Arkansas National Guard Troops often traveled out of state to conduct training at U.S. Army facilities. In 1940, all Arkansas National Guard units participated in the 4th Army Maneuvers held in Minnesota beginning August 24, 1940.

The 206th Coast Artillery also conducted summer encampments at Fort Sill, Oklahoma, and in 1933 and 1934 at Fort Barrancas, Florida; Fort Sheridan, Illinois, and Camp Pacos, Texas.

== Flood relief, 1927 ==
The great Mississippi River flood of 1927 was one of the worst natural disasters in American history. It inundated 27,000 square miles, an area about the size of New England, killing as many as 1,000 people and displacing 700,000 more. At a time when the entire budget of the federal government was barely $3 billion, the flood caused an estimated $1 billion in damage. Although National Guard aviation units had been regularly called upon to assist civil authorities since early in that decade, the 1927 flood marked the first time that an entire Guard flying unit and its government-issued aircraft had been mobilized to help deal with a major natural disaster.

Governor John E. Martineau called up the 10 officers and 50 enlisted members of the 154th Observation Squadron, Arkansas National Guard, to help locate stranded flood victims as well as to deliver food, medicines and supplies to them and relief workers. The unit also conducted aerial patrols along the Mississippi River scouting for weakened or broken levees. Its JN-4 Jenny aircraft flew some 20,000 miles during the mobilization which lasted from 18 April through 3 May 1927. Members of the unit also worked to strengthen and repair river levees.

Flood relief operations took a toll on the 154th. Two aircraft crashed and at least three aviators were injured. The unit's remaining aircraft were grounded for maintenance and repairs at one point. Because of the heavy burden of flight operations, five of the unit's aging JN-4s had to be replaced by PT-1 trainer aircraft in mid-May 1927. The flood relief work of the 154th underscores the long-standing but little understood history of Air National Guard units and their pre-World War II antecedents in supporting civil authorities.

== Organization on eve of World War II, 1939 ==
After the various re-stationing, creation and re-constitution of units, the Arkansas National Guard consisted of the following units on the eve of World War II:

State Headquarters and Detachment

- State Headquarters and Detachment- Little Rock

153rd Infantry Regiment

Headquarters	Company	Station
153 Infantry Regiment	HHC, 153rd IN	Russellville
	Service Company	Searcy
	Band Section, Svc Company	North Little Rock
	Howitzer Company	Arkadelphia
	Medical Detachment	Hot Springs
1st Battalion, 153 Infantry Regiment	Headquarters, 1-153rd In	North Little Rock
	Company A, 1-153 IN	Hope
	Company B, 1-153 IN	Magnolia
	Company C, 1-153 IN	Prescott
	Company D, 1-153 IN	Magnolia
2nd Battalion, 153 Infantry Regiment	Headquarters	Conway
	Company E, 2-153 IN	Clarksville
	Company F, 2-153 IN	Dardanelle
	Company G, 2-153 IN	Conway
	Company H, 2-153 IN	Forrest City
3rd Battalion, 153 Infantry Regiment	Headquarters, 3-153 IN	Beebe
	Company I, 3-153 IN	Pine Bluff
	Company K, 3-153 IN	Hoxie
	Company L, 3-153 IN	Batesville
	Company M, 3-153 IN	Blytheville

206th Coast Artillery Regiment (Anti Aircraft)

Unit	Station	College
Headquarters and Headquarters Battery,	Marianna	
Band Section, Service Battery	Marianna	
Medical Detachment	North Little Rock	
Service Battery	Newport	
Headquarters 1st Battalion and Ammunition Train	El Dorado	
Battery A	Little Rock	
Battery B	Monticello	Arkansas Agricultural and Mechanical College
Battery C	Jonesboro	Arkansas State College
Battery D	Russellville	Arkansas Polytechnic College
Headquarters 2nd Battalion and Ammunition Train *	Newport	
Battery E	Camden	
Battery F	Russellville	Arkansas Polytechnic College
Battery G	Helena	
Battery H	Hot Springs	

154th Observation Squadron, Air Corps

- 154th Observation Squadron, Little Rock

142nd Field Artillery Regiment

Unit	Station	College
Headquarters and Headquarters Battery,	Texarkansa	
Band Section, Service Battery	Fort Smith	
Medical Detachment	Fort Smith	
Service Battery	Harrison	
Headquarters 1st Battalion and Combat Train	Fayetteville	University of Arkansas
Battery A	Fayetteville	University of Arkansas
Battery B	Fayetteville	University of Arkansas
Headquarters 2nd Battalion and Ammunition Train *	Fort Smith	
Battery C	Fort Smith	
Battery D	Mena	
Headquarters 3rd Battalion and Ammunition Train *	Hazen	
Battery E	Paris	
Battery F	Rogers	

== World War II ==
During the buildup to World War II, while the nation was still wavering on the question of whether to enter another European War, President Roosevelt took the precaution of mobilizing the National Guard for what was originally described as one year of training. The first units were mobilized in September 1940 and by the end of January 1941 all units of the Arkansas National Guard were mobilized. Many of these units had completed their post mobilization training and been shipped to duty at various stations several months before the United States officially declared war after the Japanese attack on Pearl Harbor on December 7, 1941. In all 272 officers and 41496 enlisted men of the Arkansas National Guard were mustered into Federal Service for World War II.

=== 154th Observation Squadron ===
The first unit called to active duty was the 154th Observation Squadron on September 16, 1940. After extensive stateside training, the majority of the squadron departed New York City and arrived in North Africa November 8, 1942. The airplanes arrived in early December, having flown from Florida to South America and across the Southern Atlantic via Ascension Island to Africa. Only 23 of 36 planes that started the trip arrived in North Africa. Flying A-20s, P-38s, P-39s and P-51s, the 154th flew combat missions from several airfields in North Africa. The 154th is credited with flying the first combat mission in a P-51 in the Mediterranean April 9, 1943. The squadron moved to Bari Airdrome east of Naples, Italy in February 1944. There the 154th flew combat missions all across Europe until the end of the war. The squadron earned a distinguished unit citation for its service in operations over the Ploesti oil refineries in August 1944.

=== 153rd Infantry ===
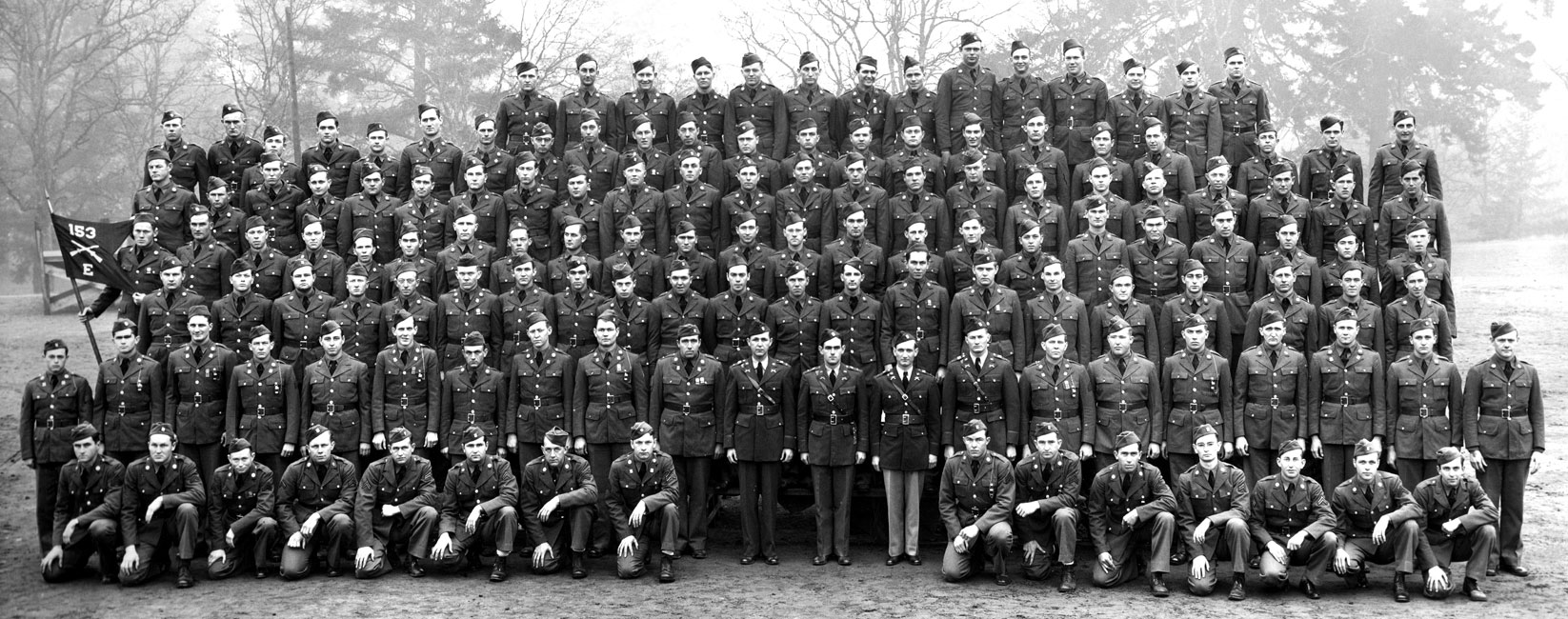
Company E, 153rd Infantry, Arkansas National Guard after they were mobilized, but before they were sent to Washington State and then the Aleutian Islands. This photograph was likely taken at Camp Forrest, Tennessee, in early 1941.

The 153rd Infantry Regiment was ordered to active duty on December 23, 1940, as a part of a one-year mobilization of the National Guard in preparation for World War II, and spent the next 10 days at what is now the University of Central Arkansas. The 153rd then moved to Camp Robinson and completed basic training. Moving to Camp Forrest, TN, the regiment spent six week in maneuvers and returned to Camp Robinson for a few days of leave before shipping out to Camp Murray, WA on August 20, 1941.

The 153rd, along with the 206th Coast Artillery Regiment arrived in Alaska in August 1941.

The 1st and 3rd Battalions, 153rd Infantry were then posted to Annette Island and Seward, Nome and Yakutat, Alaska.

Headquarters of Companies E and F, 2nd Battalion, 153rd Infantry, Arkansas Army National Guard, on Umnak Island, in the Aleutian Islands, Alaska, 1942

The 2nd Battalion, 153rd Infantry was stationed on Umnak Island, west of Dutch Harbor and took part in the occupation of Adak Island and the assault on Kiska, August 15, 1943, part of the Aleutian Islands Campaign. The Japanese had secretly abandoned Kiska only days before the invasion by U.S. Forces. The recapture of Kiska brought the Aleutian Islands Campaign to a close.

The 153rd returned to Camp Shelby, Mississippi, on March 21, 1944, and was inactivated on June 30, 1944; its soldiers assigned to other units as replacements. Many returned to Camp Robinson as cadre. The 153rd was awarded the following Campaign Participation Credit:

- Aleutian Islands Campaign

=== 206th Coast Artillery ===
The 206th Coast Artillery Regiment (CA) was inducted into Federal service 6 January 1941 at home stations as a part of a one-year mobilization of the National Guard in preparation for World War II. Later the Regiment moved to Fort Bliss, Texas, and conducted its initial training. The 206th Coast Artillery Regiment was deployed to Dutch Harbor in the Aleutian Islands, Alaska, and had been on station for approximately 4 months when the Japanese Navy attacked Pearl Harbor on December 7, 1941. The 206th CA was equipped with the M1918 3-inch Gun (an older model with a vertical range of 8,200 m), .50-caliber machine guns, and 60-inch (1.5 m) Sperry searchlights.

In June 1942, as part of the Japanese operations against Midway Island, the Japanese attacked the Aleutian Islands, starting with the Battle of Dutch Harbor, beginning what would become known as the Aleutian Islands Campaign.

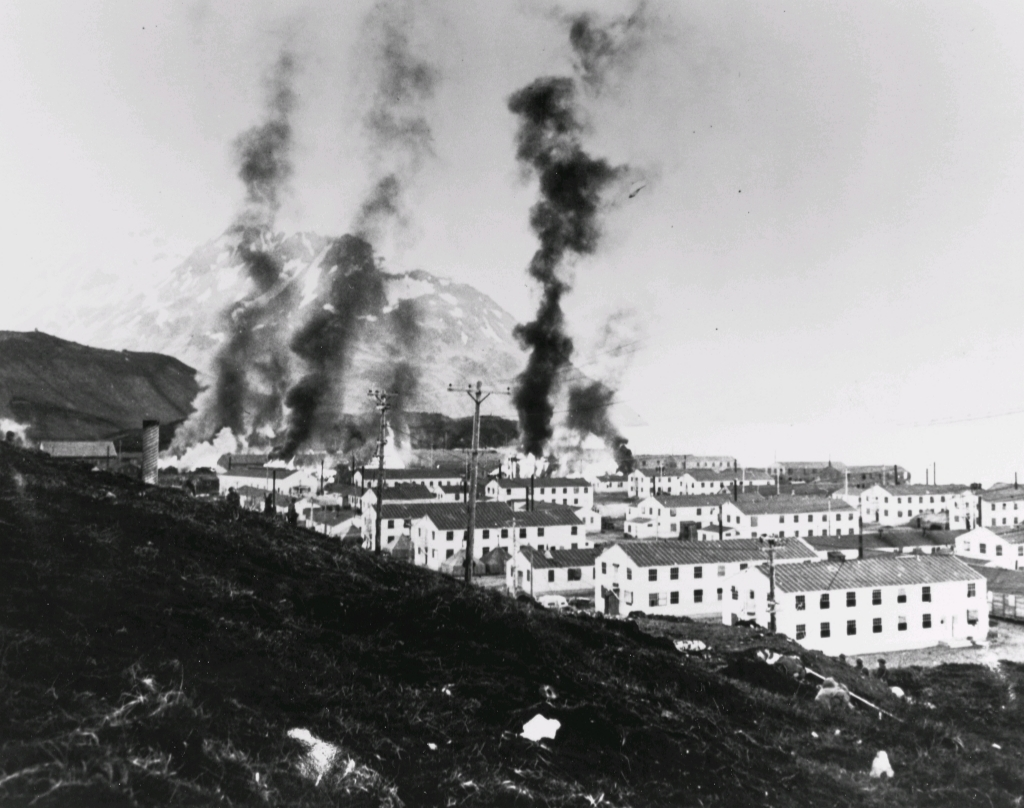
Buildings burning after the first enemy attack on Dutch Harbor, June 3, 1942

A Japanese task force led by Admiral Kakuji Kakuta bombed Dutch Harbor on Unalaska Island twice, once on June 3 and again the following day. Many members of the 206th were awakened on June 3 by the sound of bombs and gunfire. While the unit had been on alert for an attack for many days, there was no specific warning of the attack before the Japanese planes arrived over Dutch Harbor. With no clear direction from headquarters, other than an initial cease fire order which was quickly withdrawn, gun crews from every battery quickly realized the danger, ran to their guns stationed around the harbor and began to return fire. In addition to their 3-inch guns, 37mm guns and .50 caliber machine guns, members of the unit fired their rifles and one even claimed to have hurled a wrench at a low flying enemy plane. Several members reported being able to clearly see the faces of the Japanese aviators as they made repeated runs over the island. The highest casualties on the first day occurred when bombs struck barracks 864 and 866 in Fort Mears, killing Seventeen men of the 37th Infantry and eight from the 151st Engineers. The 206th CA spent much of the night of June 3 to June 4 moving their guns down off the mountain tops surrounding the harbor and into the city. Civilian contractor's offered to help and were put to work filling sandbags to protect the new gun positions. When the Japanese returned on June 4, the Zeros concentrated on strafing the gun positions while their bombers destroyed the full tanks located at the harbor. After the fuel tanks, the enemy concentrated on the ships in the harbor, the Fillmore and the Gillis.

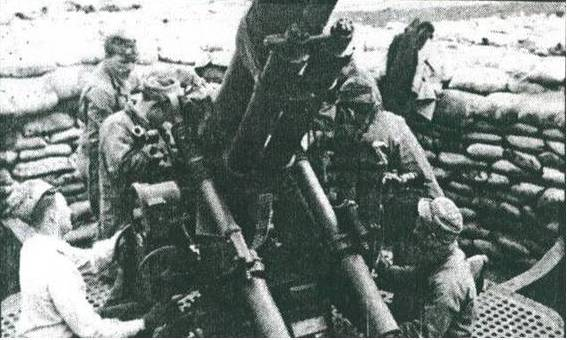
3 inch antiaircraft gun from Battery C, 206th Coast Artillery, at Dutch Harbor Alaska, 1942

Driven away from these two targets by intense anti aircraft fire, they finally succeeded in destroying the Northwestern which, because of its large size they mistakenly believed was a warship. The Northwestern was actually a transport ship which was beached and its power plant was being used to produce steam and electricity for the shore installations. The damage caused to the Dutch Harbor Naval facilities and nearby Fort Mears, including the destruction of gas storage facilities and the destruction of the Northwestern, were strategically insignificant. The significant outcomes of the battle were the discovery of a secret U.S. airbase in the Aleutian Islands, previously unknown to the Japanese, and the recovery of a Japanese Zero aircraft by U.S. forces following the battle. The Regiment sustained seven killed in action during the bombing of Dutch Harbor.

With the threat to the Aleutian Islands at an end, the Regiment was redeployed to Fort Bliss in March 1944, deactivated and personnel were reassigned. The 1st Battalion was redesignated the 596th AAA (automatic weapons), but was broken up after a month and its personnel used as replacements. The 2nd Battalion was redesignated the 597th AAA (automatic weapons) and participated in the Central Europe and Rhineland campaigns. The 3rd Battalion, which was created in Alaska, was redesignated the 339th Searchlight Battalion but was disbanded in less than three months and its personnel used as replacements. Several hundred former members of the 206th became infantry replacements, most being assigned to the 86th and the 87th Infantry Divisions. The 597th AAA was inactivated December 12, 1945, at Camp Kilmer, New Jersey. The 206th was awarded the following Campaign Participation Credit:

- Aleutian Islands
- Rhineland
- Central Europe

=== 142nd Field Artillery Group ===
The 142nd Field Artillery Regiment was inducted into Federal service on 6 January 1941, at Fayetteville. The 142nd Field Artillery Regiment was ordered the unit moved to Fort Sill, OK where the 3rd Battalion was disbanded. In February the Regiment moved to Camp Bowie, TX and began extensive training. On February 25, 1943, the 142nd Field Artillery Regiment was disbanded. The headquarters was redesignated the 142nd Field Artillery Group, the 1st Battalion became the 936th and the 2nd became the 937th. These were independent battalions equipped with the 155mm howitzer.

The 142nd Field Artillery Group left Camp Bowie September 25, 1943, and arrived in England on November 3, 1943. It crossed Utah Beach June 10, 1944, and participated in the European offensive with up to five battalions attached. When the war ended it was 25 miles (40 km) from the Elbe River.

The 936th Field Artillery Battalion left Camp Bowie August 9, 1943, arrived in Algiers September 2, 1943, and landed in Naples, Italy November 11, 1943. It participated in the drive across the Rapido River, the liberation of Rome and the assault on Mount Cassino. When the war ended the 936th was across the Po River, about 45 miles (72 km) from Venice. It had fired 139,364 rounds in combat and was awarded battle streamers for the following campaigns:

- Naples-Foggia
- Rome-Arno
- North Apennines, and
- Po Valley.

The 937th Field Artillery Battalion left Camp Bowie on August 10, 1943, arrived in Algiers September 2, 1943, and landed in Naples, Italy November 11, 1943. It participated in the drive across the Rapido River and the liberation of Rome. It then prepared for and participated in the amphibious landings in southern France August 15, 1944. One of vessels carrying the 937th FA was hit by a German bomber resulting in 1 KIA, 2 MIA, 83 WIA and the loss of the fire direction equipment and one battery of howitzers. The 937th fired over 200,000 combat rounds and was awarded battle streamers for the following campaigns:

- Naples-Foggio
- Rome-Arno
- Southern France (with arrowhead)
- Rhineland and,
- Central Europe.

=== Re-establishment of the Arkansas State Guard ===
Just as the State had organized the Home Guard units for World War I in order to give the governor a force to utilize in case of emergency, the state re-established the Arkansas State Guard during World War II. General Order Number 4, dated May 1, 1942, established the State Guard with officer and enlisted strength, stationing and designations as follows:

Unit	Station	Officers	Enlisted
Equipment HQ	Little Rock	10	None
Headquarters Detachment, 1st Battalion	Camden	3	11
Medical Detachment	Hot Springs	3	8
Company A	El Dorado	3	55
Company B	Prescott	3	5
Company C	Hot Springs	3	55
Company D	Pine Bluff	3	55
Headquarters Detachment, 2nd Battalion	Russellville	3	11
Medial Detachment	Conway	3	8
Company E	Batesville	3	55
Company F	Forrest City	3	55
Company G	Rogers	3	55
Company H	Fort Smith	3	55

In all the Arkansas State Guard was authorized 46 Officers and 478 Enlisted Soldiers. The State Guard responded to fires, tornados, and floods at Fort Smith, Little Rock, Pine Bluff, Texarkana and Batesville during the War. The Arkansas State Guard was deactivated between 17 September 1946 and 16 December 1946.

== Arkansas National Guard Fallen Soldiers, World War II ==
This list is intended to include all known Arkansas National Guardsmen who died during combat operations in support of World War II. This list may be shorter than corresponding list of casualties included in various unit histories because those lists may include soldiers who were assigned to the units as replacements after mobilization.

=== 142nd Field Artillery Group ===
- The 936th Field Artillery Battalion sustained one officer and six enlisted soldiers killed and one officer and twenty seven enlisted soldiers wounded.
- The 937th Field Artillery Battalion sustained one officer and thirteen enlisted soldiers killed and 126 soldiers wounded.

=== 206th Coast Artillery Regiment ===
- Private Claude H. Biggs, Battery F, Killed in Action, Dutch Harbor, Alaska, 3 June 1942
- Private Allen C. Collier, Jr., HQ Battery, 2nd Battalion, Dutch Harbor, Alaska, Killed in Action, 3 June 1942
- Private James E. Harrington, Battery E, Killed in Action, Dutch Harbor, Alaska, 3 June 1942
- Private Hugh Bryan Timberlake, Battery B, Killed in Action, Dutch Harbor, Alaska, 3 June 1942
- Private James R. Wiles, Battery C, Killed in Action, Dutch Harbor, Alaska, 3 June 1942
- Private Charles W. Hill, Battery F, Killed in Action, Dutch Harbor, Alaska, 4 June 1942
- Private Ambrose D. Regalia, Battery F, Killed in Action, Dutch Harbor, Alaska, 4 June 1942
