= 153rd Brigade =

153rd Brigade may refer to:

- 153rd Mixed Brigade, Spain
- 153rd Mechanized Brigade, Ukraine
- 153rd Infantry Brigade (United Kingdom)
- 153rd Cavalry Brigade

== See also ==
- 153rd Division (disambiguation)
- 153rd Regiment (disambiguation)
