= NH 153 =

NH 153 may refer to:

- National Highway 153 (India)
- New Hampshire Route 153, United States
