= 153rd Division =

In military terms, 153rd Division or 153rd Infantry Division may refer to:

- 153rd Grenadier Division, Wehrmacht, Germany, formed in 1939 and fought in World War II
- 153rd Infantry Division "Macerata", Italy, World War II
- 153rd Division (Imperial Japanese Army)
- 153rd Rifle Division, Soviet Union

== See also ==
- List of military divisions by number
- 153rd Brigade (disambiguation)
- 153rd Regiment (disambiguation)
- 153rd (disambiguation)
