= 153rd Illinois Infantry Regiment =

153rd Regiment Illinois Volunteer Infantry
- Illinois state flag
- Active: February 27, 1865, to September 15, 1865
- Country: United States
- Allegiance: Union
- Branch: Infantry

The 153rd Regiment Illinois Volunteer Infantry was an infantry regiment that served in the Union Army during the American Civil War.

== Service ==
The 153rd Illinois Infantry was organized at Chicago, Illinois, and mustered into Federal service on February 27, 1865, for a one-year enlistment.

The Regiment was assigned to guard duty on the Nashville & Chattanooga Railroad until July 1865, when they moved to Memphis, Tennessee for duty until September.

The regiment mustered out September 15, 1865.

== Total strength and casualties ==
The regiment suffered 37 enlisted men who died of disease for a total of 37 fatalities.

== Commanders ==
- Colonel Stephen Bronson - mustered out with the regiment.

== See also ==
- List of Illinois Civil War Units
- Illinois in the American Civil War
