= Class 153 =

Class 153 may refer to:

- British Rail Class 153
- Kaidai-type submarine, also known as I-153 class
