= 1st Infantry =

1st Infantry may refer to:

- 1st Infantry Battalion (disambiguation)
- 1st Infantry Regiment (disambiguation)
- 1st Infantry Brigade (disambiguation)
- 1st Infantry Division (disambiguation)
- 1st Bombay Native Infantry (disambiguation)
- 1st Infantry (album), debut album by The Alchemist
