= 1st Infantry Battalion =

1st Infantry Battalion may refer to:

== American Civil War battalions ==
=== Confederate Army ===
- 1st Confederate Infantry Battalion
- 1st Louisiana Infantry Battalion
- 1st Battalion, Mississippi Infantry
- 1st Battalion, Mississippi Sharpshooters

=== Union Army ===
- 1st Arkansas Infantry Battalion
- 1st California Veteran Infantry Battalion
- 1st Georgia Infantry Battalion
- 1st Maine Infantry Battalion
- 1st Minnesota Infantry Battalion
- 1st Missouri State Militia Infantry Battalion
- 1st Nevada Infantry Battalion
- 1st Virginia Infantry Battalion

== United States Army ==
- 1st Battalion, 1st Infantry Regiment
- 1st Battalion, 28th Infantry Regiment
- 1st Battalion, 36th Infantry Regiment
- 1st Battalion, 153rd Infantry Regiment
- 1st Battalion, 503rd Infantry Regiment

== Other Battalions ==
- 1st Canadian Infantry Battalion (disambiguation)
- 2/1st Battalion (Australia)
- 1st Somerset Militia
- 1st New Guinea Infantry Battalion
- 1st Infantry Battalion (KNIL)
- 1st Battalion, 4th Madras Native Infantry
- 1st Battalion, 16th Bengal Native Infantry
- 1st Battalion, 24th Bengal Native Infantry
- 1st Battalion, 30th Bengal Native Infantry
- 1st Battalion, 33rd Bengal Native Infantry
- 1st Battalion of The Frontier Force Regiment
- 1st Independent Motorized Infantry Battalion
- 1st Gwent Battalion
- 1st London Welsh Battalion
- 1st (City of Bristol) Volunteer Battalion, Gloucestershire Regiment
- 1st Colonial Infantry Battalion

== See also ==
- 1st Battalion (disambiguation)
- 1st Infantry Regiment (disambiguation)
- 1st Infantry Brigade (disambiguation)
- 1st Infantry Division (disambiguation)
