= 1st Battalion, 153rd Infantry Regiment =

1st Battalion, 153d Infantry Regiment (First Arkansas)
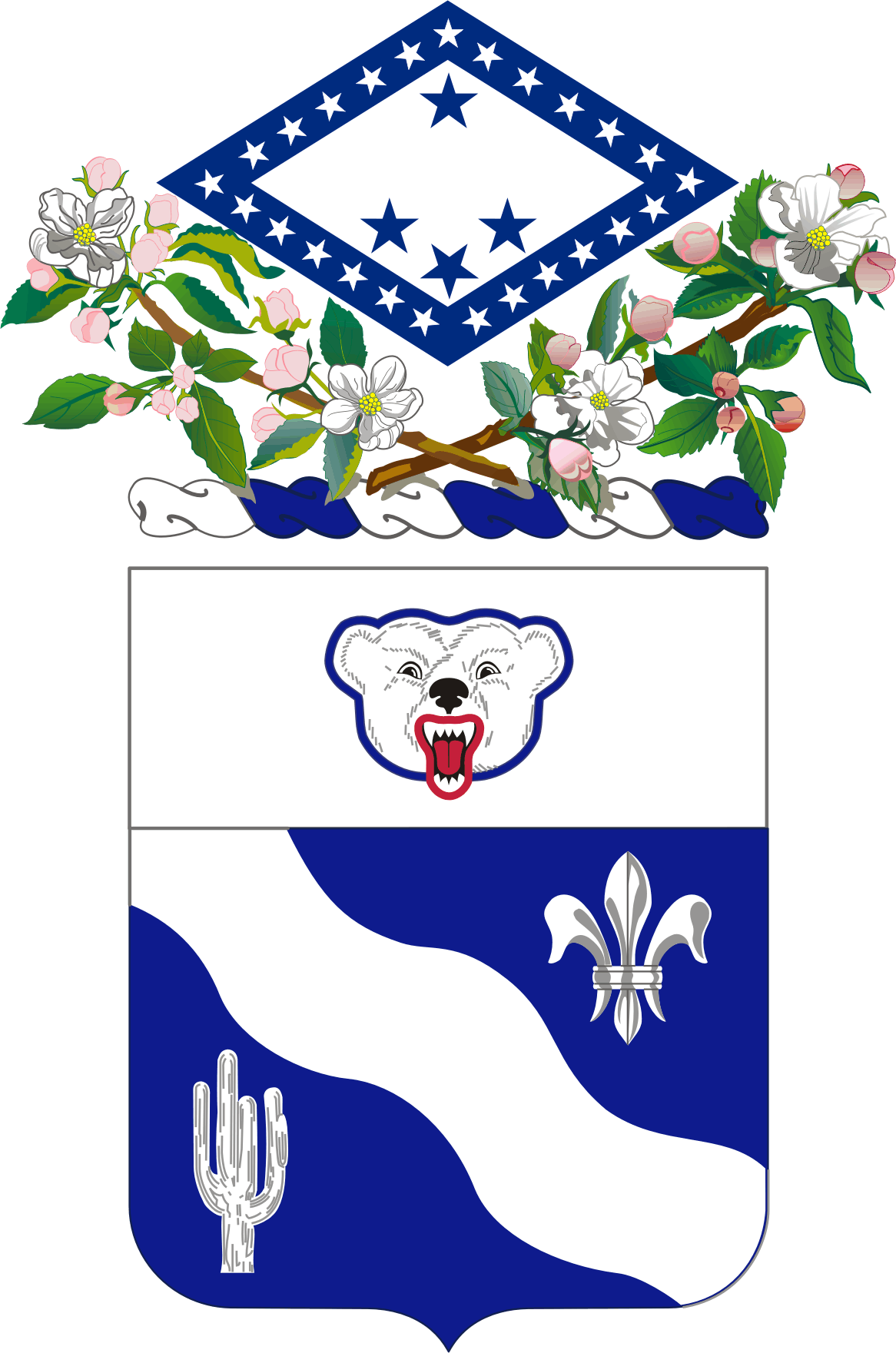
- Regiment coat of arms
- Active: 1890–1919, 1920–44, 1946–present
- Country: United States
- Allegiance: Arkansas
- Branch: Army National Guard
- Type: Infantry
- Size: One battalion
- Part of: 39th Infantry Brigade Combat Team
- Headquarters: Malvern, Arkansas
- Nickname: "First Arkansas"
- Motto: Let's Go
- Facings: Light blue
- Assault rifle: M4A1 carbine
- Campaigns: World War I World War II: Aleutian Islands; War on terrorism: Operation Iraqi Freedom; Somali Civil War (2009–present)

Commanders
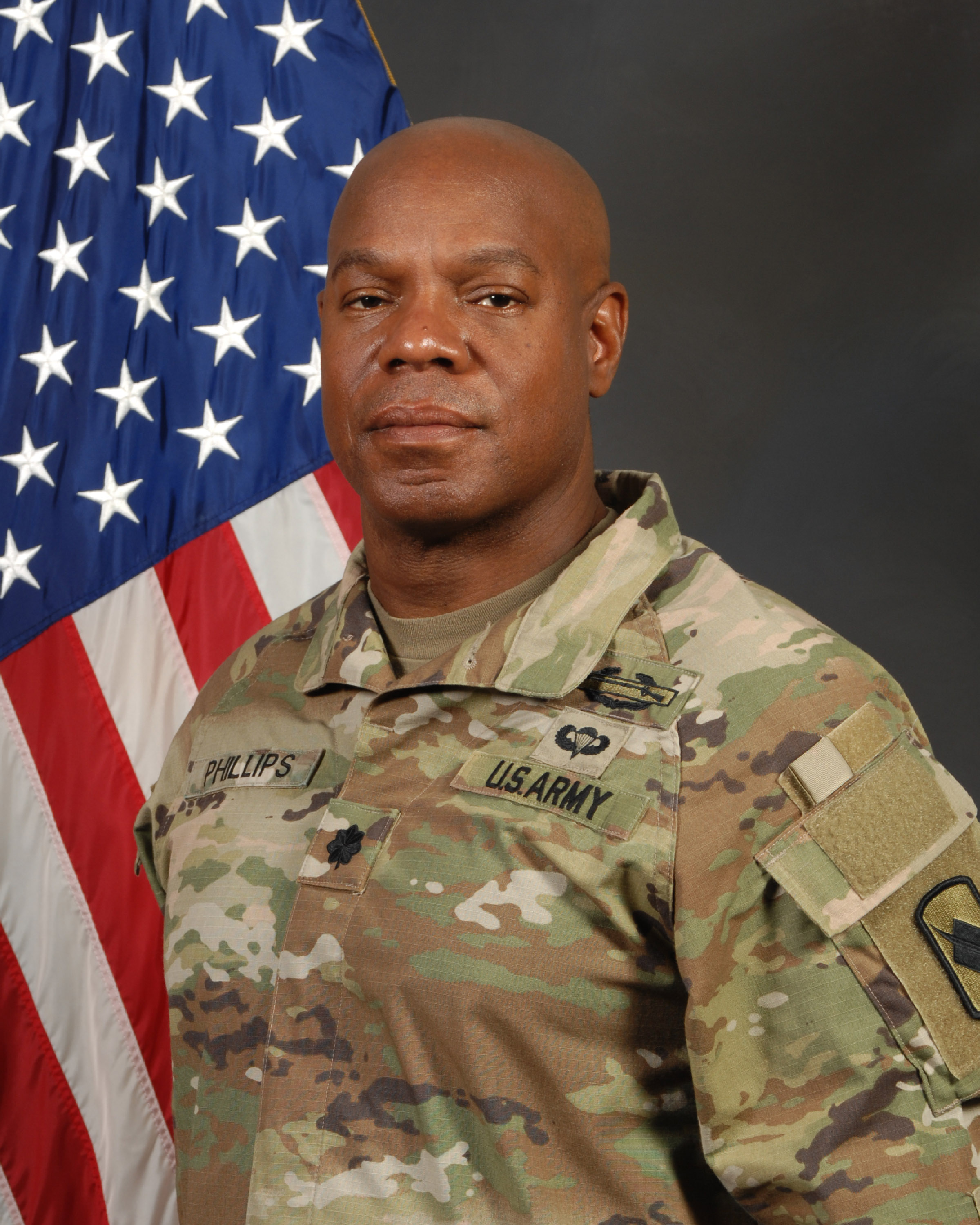
- Current commander: LTC Thomas L. Edwards

Insignia
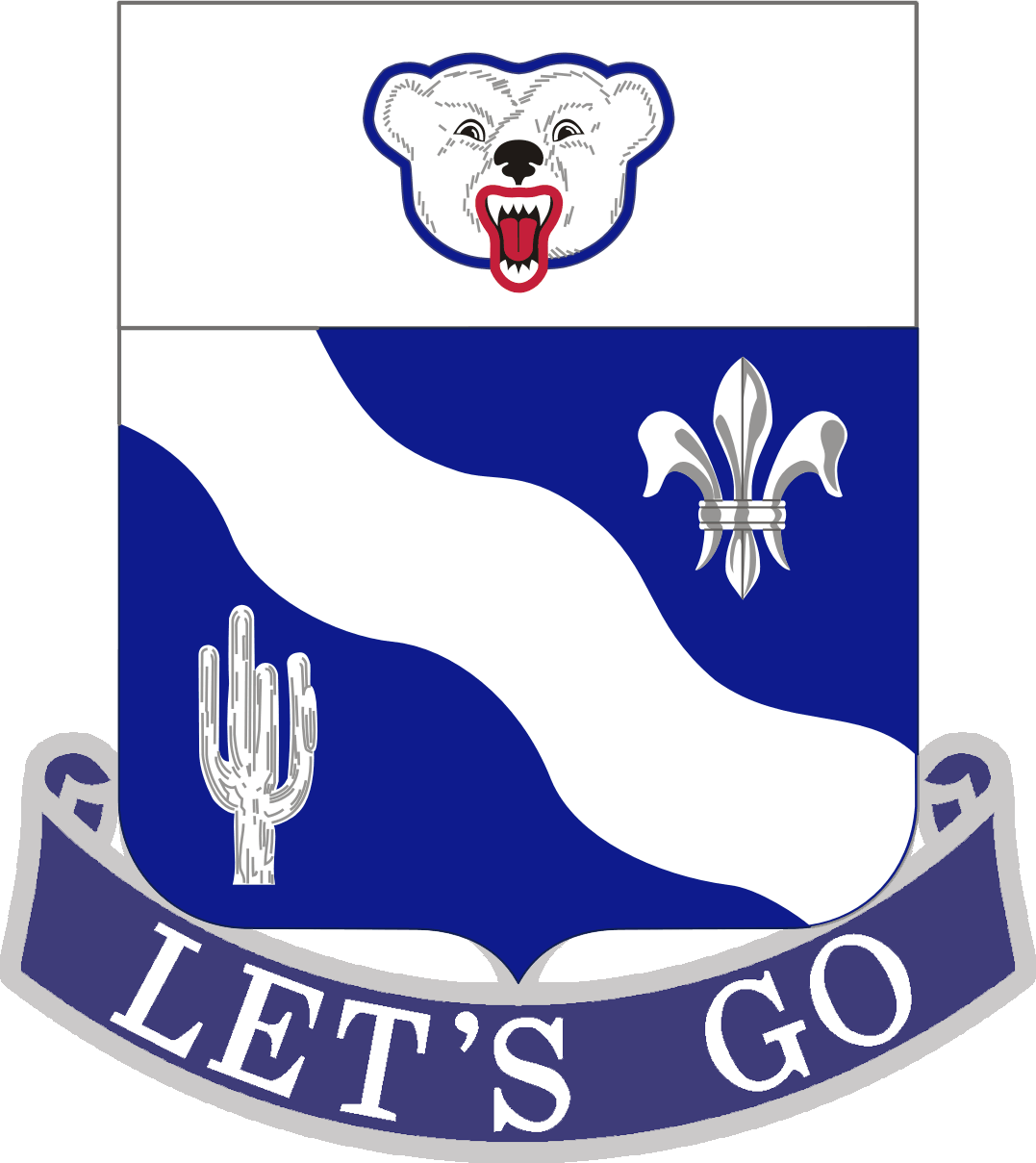
- Regimental insignia

The 1st Battalion, 153rd Infantry Regiment (First Arkansas), is an infantry battalion of the Arkansas Army National Guard, headquartered at Malvern, assigned to the 39th Infantry Brigade Combat Team. The 1–153rd has deployed companies in support of the Multi-National Security Force (SFOR 9) to Bosnia and to Saudi Arabia as part of Operation Southern Watch. 1st Battalion, 153rd Infantry has twice deployed as a battalion for Operation Iraqi Freedom, once from 2004–05 and a second time in 2008. The battalion was awarded the Meritorious Unit Citation for the period, 17 March 2004 – 23 March 2005.

== Background ==
The history of the 1st Battalion, 153rd Infantry as an individual battalion really begins with the reorganization of the 39th Infantry Division in 1967 and the creation of the 39th Infantry Brigade (Separate). For history of the 1st Battalion prior to 1967, see 153rd Infantry Regiment (United States) and 39th Infantry Division (United States).

== Creation of 39th Infantry Brigade ==
In 1967 the 39th Infantry Division was reorganized and redesignated as the 39th Infantry Brigade (Separate) and in 1973 was paired with the US 101st Airborne Division as a training partner and became an air-assault brigade.

In 1994 the 39th was again reorganized and gained its designation as an "enhanced" brigade.

In 1999, the 39th became part of the 7th Infantry Division under the Army Integrated Division concept which paired National Guard and Reserve brigades with active duty headquarters and support units.

== Overseas training deployments ==
The 1st Battalion, 153rd Infantry units conducted numerous overseas training rotations throughout the 1980s and early 1990s.

- 1986, Company B, 1–153 conducted annual training in Honduras.
- 1990, Company A, 1–153rd conducted annual training in Honduras as part of the National Guard Bureau's Overseas Training Program. Company C, 1–153rd Infantry conducted annual training in the United Kingdom.
- 1991, 1–153rd Infantry deployed with selected members of 2–153rd on a SOUTHCOM rotation to the Jungle Operations Training Center (JOTO) at Fort Sherman, Panama.

== Operation Southern Watch ==
In May through September 1999, Company B, 2nd Battalion, 153 Infantry was activated for Operation Southern Watch. B/2-153 deployed to Kuwait. 39th Brigade Soldiers provided security at Patriot Missile batteries during these deployments. The mission lasted a total of seven months, and was the first "pure" National Guard effort in the region.

Company C, 1st Battalion, 153rd Infantry carried on the 39th's role in Operation Southern Watch when they replaced B/2-153 IN in September 1999.

== Security Force Nine (SFOR 9) ==
In March 2001, Company D, 1–153rd and Company D, 3–153rd deployed to Bosnia as part of the Multinational Stabilization Force (SFOR), Security Force Nine in order to assist with the enforcement of the mandate of the United Nations Mission in Bosnia and Herzegovina (UNMIBH). The companies were attached to 3rd Squadron, 7 Cavalry Regiment, 3rd Infantry Division for the deployment as part of Task Force Eagle. They performed presence patrols outside Forward Operating Base Morgan and Camp McGovern, and participated in the consolidation of weapon storage sites. The soldiers also guarded the sites.

== Operation Iraqi Freedom II ==
=== Ramp-up ===
In 2002 the 1st Battalion, 153rd Infantry Regiment was notified that it would be participating in a rotation to the Joint Readiness Training Center (JRTC) at Fort Polk, LA as a part of the 39th Infantry Brigade (Separate). For National Guard units, a rotation is actually a three-year process that provides additional money, resources and training opportunities in order to improve unit readiness before the actual rotation through the JRTC. The battalion was required to complete a mission rehearsal exercise during the 2003 annual training conducted at Fort Chaffee, Arkansas. Less than a month after the completion of this major training milestone, the battalion received its alert for deployment to Iraq in support of Operation Iraqi Freedom on 28 July 2003.

=== Alert, train, and man the battalion ===
On 12 October 2003, the battalion, commanded by Lieutenant Colonel Kendall A. Penn, was ordered to federal service in support of Operation Iraqi Freedom II for a period of up to 18 months. The battalion would undergo post mobilization training at Fort Hood, Texas from October 2003 until January 2004. In January the battalion shipped its vehicles and equipment to Iraq from Fort Hood, and then moved to Fort Polk for a Mission Rehearsal Exercise at the JRTC.

When the 1st Battalion, 153rd Infantry Regiment received its alert for deployment, it was approximately 130 soldiers short of its authorized end strength. This shortage was due in large part to the way new recruits are accounted for in the National Guard. In the active army a new recruit only comes to a unit and is counted on its books after the soldier has completed Basic Combat Training and Advanced Individual Training. In the National Guard, the new recruit is counted on the unit's strength reports as soon as the soldier signs his contract. The 39th Brigade had over 500 soldiers who had not completed either Basic or Advanced Individual Training upon alert.

This shortage led to the decision to consolidate the available manning into two infantry battalions that would be supplied for the brigade by the Arkansas National Guard and to ask National Guard Bureau to provide the third infantry battalion. The 1st Battalion, 153rd Infantry Regiment was selected as one of the two Arkansas infantry battalions which would deploy.

During consolidation of the 1st, 2nd and 3rd battalions 153rd Infantry for OIF II, efforts were made to maintain unit integrity at least the platoon level. The units were consolidated in the following fashion:

Battalion Headquarters	OIF II Unit	Consolidated Units
3rd Battalion, 153rd Infantry	HHC, 3–153rd	HHC, 2–153rd
	Company A, 3–153rd	Company
	Company B, 3–153rd	Company B, 2–153rd
	Company C 3–153rd	Company C,
	Company D, 3–153rd	Company D,
1st Battalion, 153rd Infantry	HHC, 1–153rd	HHC, 1–153rd
	Company A 1–153rd	Company A and 2 Plts from B/1-153rd
	Company B, 1–153rd	Company B, 3–153rd
	Company C, 1–153rd	Company C, 1–153rd
	Company D, 1–153rd	Company D, 1–153rd and 1 Plt from D/3-153rd
	Company D, 3–153rd	Company D,

=== Operation Bowie Fury ===
==== Area of operations ====
The 39th BCT was task organized with 1–153rd IN being detached to 3rd Brigade Combat Team, 1st Cavalry Brigade, in exchange for the attachment of 2nd Squadron, 7th Cavalry Regiment, to the 39th Brigade Combat Team.

1–153rd IN was headquartered in the Green Zone in Baghdad with the 3rd Brigade, 1st Cavalry Division. The 1–153rd was further task organized with in the 3rd BCT by the detachment of Company C, 1–153rd to 1st Squadron, 9th Cavalry Regiment. The 1–153rd in turn received the attachment of the Troop A, 1–9th Cav, a mechanized cavalry unit, thus providing the task force with a mechanized company team.

==== Significant combat actions ====
Task Force (TF) 1–153rd Infantry (Inf) was task organized effective 16 March 2004. The task organization included A/1-9 Cavalry and direct support maintenance elements of the 39th Support Battalion. The task force's assigned strength for the deployment averaged 720 Soldiers during the service period. TF 1–153rd conducted a tactical convoy from Kuwait to Baghdad, Iraq, 1–3 April 2004. The convoy consisted of ten serials, totaling over 300 vehicles representing six of the 3rd Brigade Combat Team (BCT), 1st Cavalry Division task forces. Upon arrival in its area of responsibility (AOR), the Karradah District of Baghdad, TF 1–153rd was charged with securing zones 10, 13, 14W and operating Checkpoint 11, a major point of entry into the International Zone (IZ). On 6 May 2004 a vehicle borne improvised explosive device (VBIED) attached Checkpoint 11, resulting in one soldier killed in action (KIA) and two soldiers wounded in action (WIA). The TF 1–153rd soldiers manning the checkpoint were successful in containing the attack and prevented entry into the IZ.

TF 1–153rd conducted over seventy raids, 8,280 patrols and 1,440 traffic control points during its deployment, resulting in 120 insurgents captured and numerous rocket propelled grenades (RPGs), explosives, and weapons captured. The task force's effectiveness was reflected in a captured arms dealer's refusal to bring shipments of heavy weapons into Karradah for fear of capture in one of the many traffic control points established by the task force. The task force was also responsible for securing numerous high-value assets (HVAs) located in its area of responsibility, including the Japanese, South Korean, Kuwait and Polish embassies, Baghdad University, and the World Health Organization.

In June 2004, the task force participated in a cordon and search operation which resulted in the discovery and disarming of a large improvised explosive device (IED) emplaced to kill the Japanese Charge d 'Affairs, and the capture of the individuals responsible for its emplacement. In January 2005, the task force responded to a vehicle borne improvised explosive device (VBIED) attack against the Supreme Council for Islamic Revolution of Iraq (SCIRI) headquarters. The attack resulted in thirteen dead and over fifty wounded Iraqi civilians. Company A and the task force quick reaction force (QRF) cordoned the area against further attack and immediately began rendering aid to wounded Iraqis. The task force later assisted SCIRI as they conducted a force protection assessment and emplaced barriers to harden the facility. Mr. Abdul Aziz Al-Hakim, the head of the party later thanked General Casey for the task force's quick response and assistance. In total, the task force was attacked by twelve VBIEDs, twenty seven IEDs, forty seven indirect fire attacks, and fifty three attacks by small arms.

A/1-9th Cav also conducted numerous combat operations on Haifa Street in Zone 8S that resulted in the capture of 114 insurgents, and numerous RPGs, mortars, and explosives. The battalion also trained Company A, 302nd Battalion of the Iraqi National Guard to company proficiency. Company A, 302d later fought in intense, sustained combat operations on Haifa Street. The task force also implemented over $5.6 million in community improvement projects and projects to restore essential services in Karradah. The money was spent to provide the greatest economic stimulus possible to the Karradah District and resulted in the creation of over 2,000 temporary jobs.

1-153rd IN captured six division targets and contained or disrupted fifteen Vehicle Borne Improvised Explosive Device (VBIED) attacks in their sector. The battalion worked to suppress indirect fire attacks on the International Zone during the Transfer of Iraqi Sovereignty and weekly Iraqi National Congress meetings. The 1–153rd commander, LTC Kendall Penn also worked closely with the Karahda District Counsel to oversee over six million dollars of infrastructure and community improvement projects in the battalion's area of operations.

Members of Company C, 1–153rd spent weeks fighting as part of TF 1–9th CAV, 3rd Brigade, 1st Cavalry Division on the hotly contested area of Haifa Street in Baghdad.

==== Redeployment ====
The 1st Battalion, 153rd Infantry Regiment was relieved in place by the 1st Battalion, 184th Infantry from the California National Guard, on 23 March 2005. During the deployment the battalion suffered a total of three killed in action. Members of the 1–153rd were awarded dozens of Bronze Stars and Army Commendation Medals with V device and numerous Purple Heart Medals. In the March 2005, units of the 1–153rd started their rotation back to Fort Sill, Oklahoma for demobilization.

==== Order of battle OIF II ====
The following units were task organized under the 1st Battalion, 153rd Infantry Regiment during Operation Iraqi Freedom II

Battalion	Company	Source
1st Battalion, 153 Infantry Regiment	HHC, 1–153rd In	Arkansas National Guard
	Company A, 1–153 IN	Arkansas National Guard
	Company B, 1–153 IN	Arkansas National Guard
	Company C, 1–153 IN	Arkansas National Guard
	Company D, 1–153 IN	Arkansas National Guard
	Troop A, 1st Squadron, 9th Cavalry	Fort Hood, Texas

1st Battalion, 153rd Infantry Regiment was task organized under 3rd Brigade, 1st Cavalry Division during OIF II

== Reorganization as brigade combat team ==
Upon redeployment in 2005, the 39th Brigade immediately began a major reorganization that transformed the brigade from an enhanced separate brigade (eSB) to an infantry brigade combat team (IBCT) under the United States Army's new Modular Design. This redesign of the army was intended to make the force more easily deployable by making brigades more self-contained and less dependent on support organizations at the division level. Major changes for the 1st Battalion, 153rd Infantry Regiment included activation of a new Forward Support Company, E, 39th BSB.

== Operation Katrina ==
After Hurricane Katrina hit Louisiana on 31 August 2005, Members of the 1st Battalion, 153rd Infantry Regiment, along with other 39th IBCT units deployed to New Orleans to support the relief and recovery efforts as part of Operation Katrina. Under tactical control of the Louisiana National Guard, 1–153rd soldiers were given the mission of providing security and food and water. The mission of the 39th IBCT in Louisiana grew to the point that at one time the brigade was responsible for working with local officials in fourteen parishes. Members of the 1st Battalion, 153rd Infantry Regiment and the Arkansas National Guard remained deployed in Louisiana until February 2006.

== Operation Jump Start ==
In June 2006 the 1st Battalion, 153rd Infantry Regiment began deploying troops along the Southwest Border with Mexico as part of Operation Jump Start. The 1–153rd manned a sector of the border around Lordsburg, New Mexico. Unit members occupied observation posts and reported activity along the border the United States Border Patrol. Various battalions within the 39th Brigade were tasked with supplying volunteer companies during this period. While serving in Operation Jump Start members of the brigade were able to begin preparing for the brigade's second deployment in support of Operation Iraqi Freedom.

It is ironic that the 1st Arkansas Infantry, the parent unit of the 153rd Infantry Regiment were stationed in this same area of New Mexico ninety years earlier during General "Black Jack" Pershing's punitive Mexican Expedition against Pancho Villa.

== Second OIF deployment ==
The 1st Battalion, 153rd Infantry Regiment and the 39th Brigade Combat Team received an alert for a second deployment in support of Operation Iraqi Freedom in April 2007. The battalion had been home almost exactly two years since demobilizing after OIF II.

This deployment would be dramatically different from the first. Instead of deploying as a battalion conducting full spectrum operations, the battalion was tasked with filling six unit requests for forces (URFs) for Force Protection Companies to support Victory Base Complex, (VBC) in Baghdad, Iraq. Additionally, Instead of an eighteen-month mobilization, with twelve months actually deployed to Iraq like the first tour, this mobilization would be for a total of twelve months, with approximately ten months being deployed to the combat theater.

The 1st Battalion, 153rd Infantry Regiment was placed on duty in October 2007 to prepare for its second deployment to Iraq while still under state control. It began a ninety-day pre-mobilization training period at Chaffee Maneuver Training Center (CMTC) on 1 October 2007. This allowed the unit to perform certain tasks in Arkansas and allowed unit members to be closer to their families for a longer period of time.

The 1–153rd was placed in federal service in January 2008 and trained at Camp Shelby, Mississippi until it deployed beginning in March 2008 to Iraq.

=== Task Force Tomahawk ===
Due to a conflict with another unit, 1–153rd Infantry was forced to give up its traditional call sign / nickname "Warrior" and instead utilized the call sign "Tomahawk" during its second OIF deployment. 39th IBCT headquarters was tasked with supplying the Base Defense Operations Center for VBC. The 1–153rd Infantry TOC acted as an area defense operations center for Camp Slayer, a part of the Victory Base Complex. Task Force 1–153rd IN consisted of a headquarters company, a Joint Visitor's Bureau Company, a personal security detachment troop and two base defense companies. The battalion was responsible for the force protection and defense of Camp Slayer and the Radwiniya Palace Complex within the Victory Base Camp. The 1–153rd Infantry searched over 10,000 cars and 35,600 Iraqis to ensure no threats penetrated the perimeter. Soldiers assigned to 1–153rd Infantry executed 996 combat patrols in the area of operations surrounding Camp Slayer and captured six high-value targets.

=== Order of battle ===
Battalion	Company	Station
HHC, 39th BCT		Camp Victory
1st Battalion, 153 Infantry Regiment	HHC, 1–153rd In	Camp Victory
	Company A, 1–153 IN	Camp Victory
	Company B, 1–153 IN	Camp Victory
	Company C, 1–153 IN	Camp Victory
	Troop A, 1–151 CAV	International Zone
	Company A, 39th Support Battalion	Camp Liberty

The 1–153rd redeployed to Camp Shelby, Mississippi in December 2008 and demobilized.

== Fallen soldiers ==
=== Operation Iraqi Freedom 2004–05 ===
- Staff Sergeant Hesley Box of Nashville, Age 24. Killed in Action, 6 May 2004
- Sergeant First Class Troy Leon Miranda of Wickes, Age 44. Killed in Action, 20 May 2004
- Sergeant Michael Smith of Camden, Age 24. Killed in Action, 26 November 2004

== Operation Freedom's Sentinel ==
The battalion deployed to Djibouti in 2017.

== Campaign participation credit ==
=== World War I ===
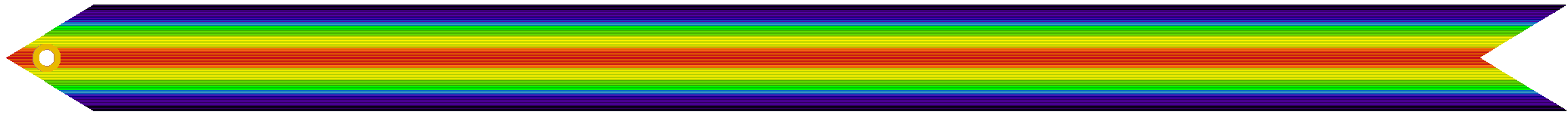

=== World War II ===
- Aleutian Islands 1942–1943

=== War on terrorism ===
- Transition of Iraq – 2003 to 2004
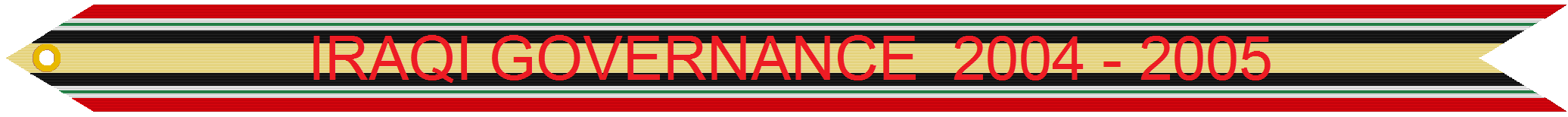
- Iraqi Governance – 2004 to 2005
- Iraqi Surge – 2007 to 2008

==== Company C (Mena), 1st Battalion, additionally entitled to ====
===== World War I =====
- Silver Ban without inscription

===== World War II =====
- European-African-Middle Eastern
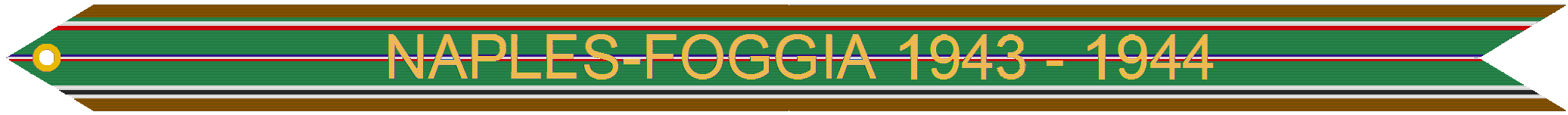
- Naples-Foggia
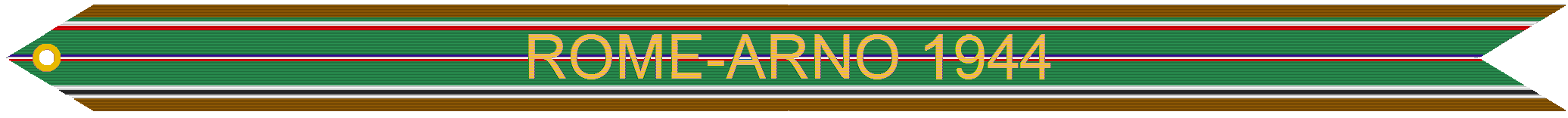
- Rome-Arno
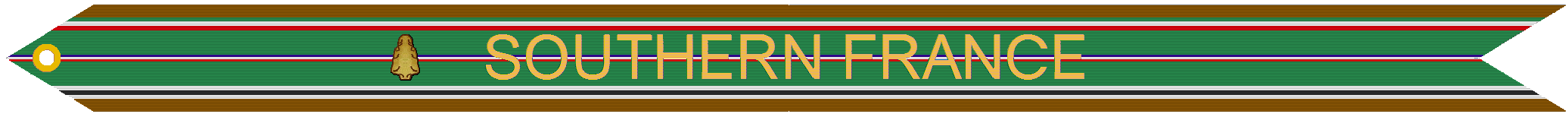
- Southern France 1944
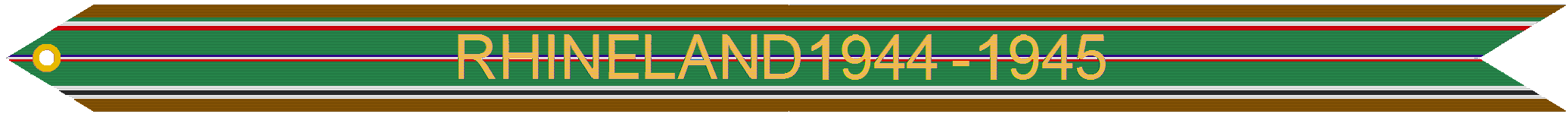
- Rhineland
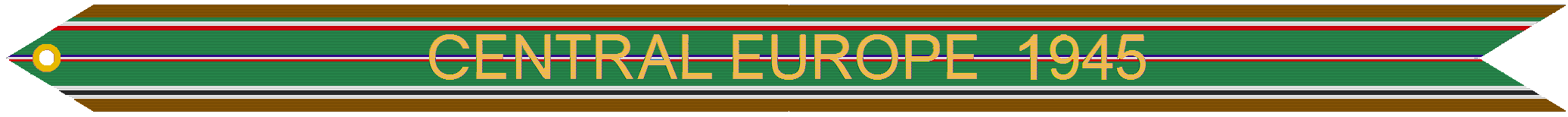
- Central Europe 1945
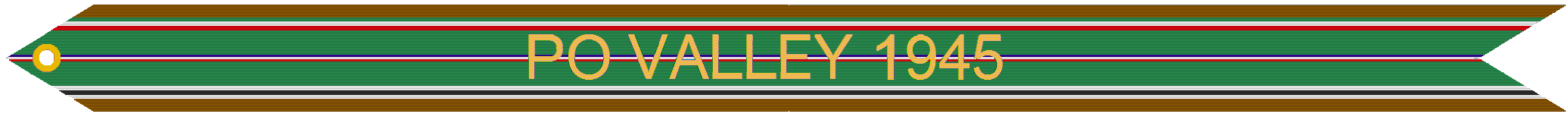
- Po Valley

===== Korean War =====
- 1st U.N. Counter Offensive 1951
- CCF Spring Offensive 1951
- U.N. Summer-Fall Offensive 1951
- Second Korean Winter 1951–1952
- Korea Summer-Fall, 1952
- Third Korean Winter 1952–1953
- Korea Summer 1953

== Unit awards ==
- 1st Battalion, 153rd Infantry was awarded a Meritorious Unit Citation (MUC) for the period of 17 March 2004 through 23 March 2005.

== Previous Battalion Commanders ==
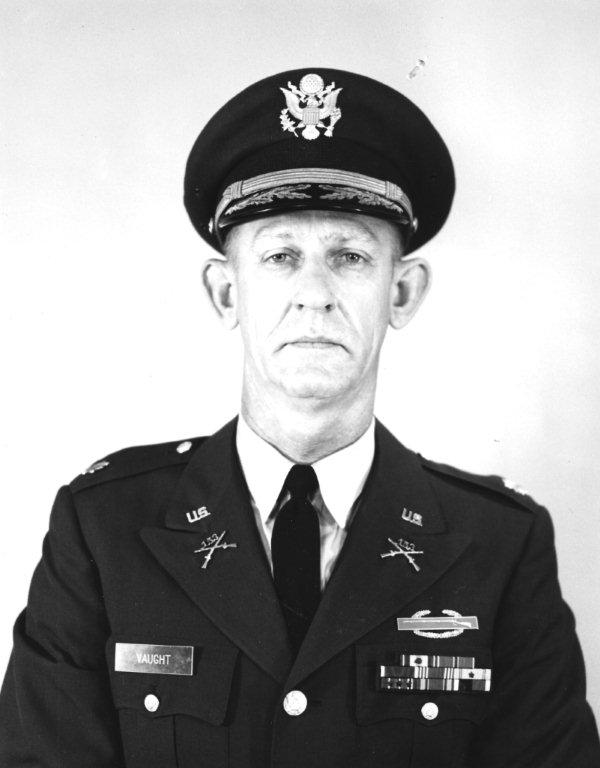
LTC Roy Vaught, 1967–71

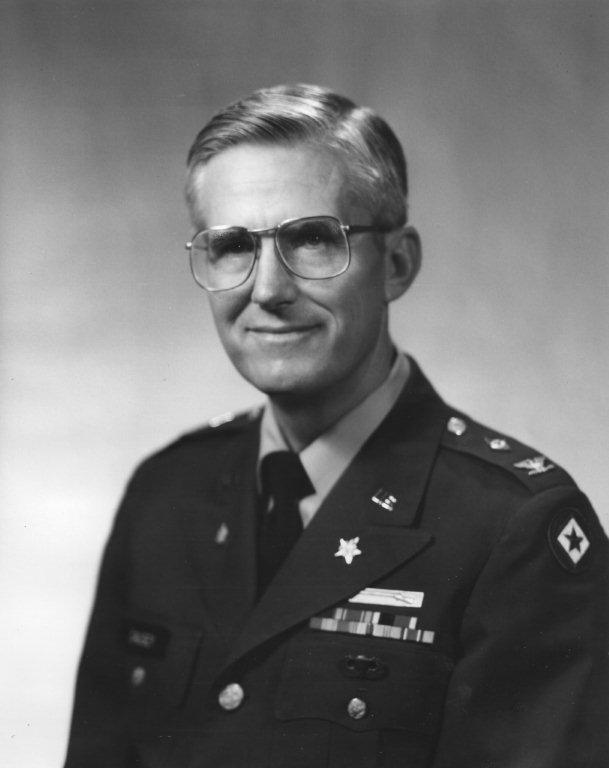
LTC James C. Causey, 1971–72

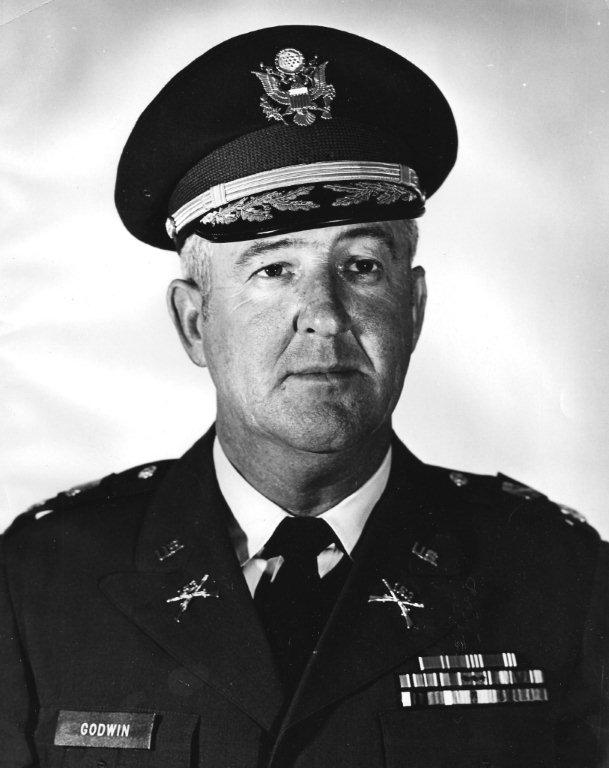
LTC James C. Godwin, 1972–74

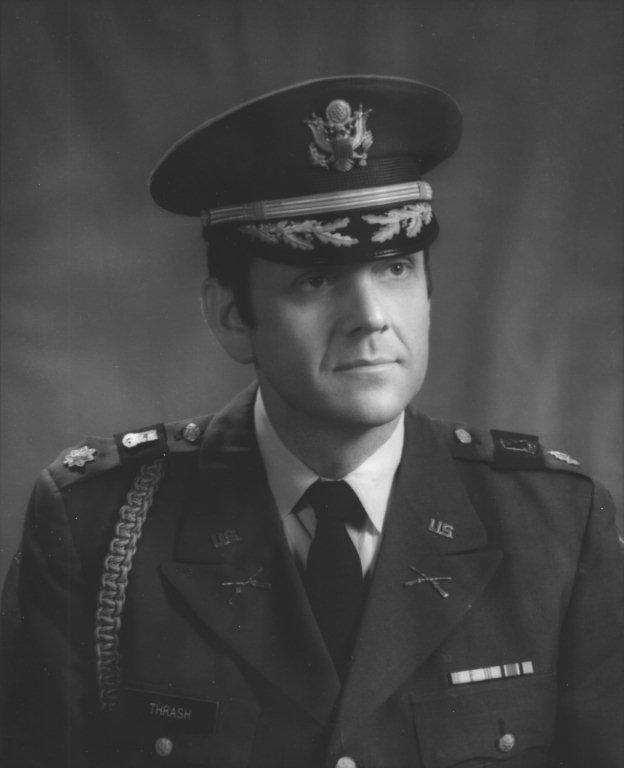
LTC Melvin C. Thrash, 1974–76

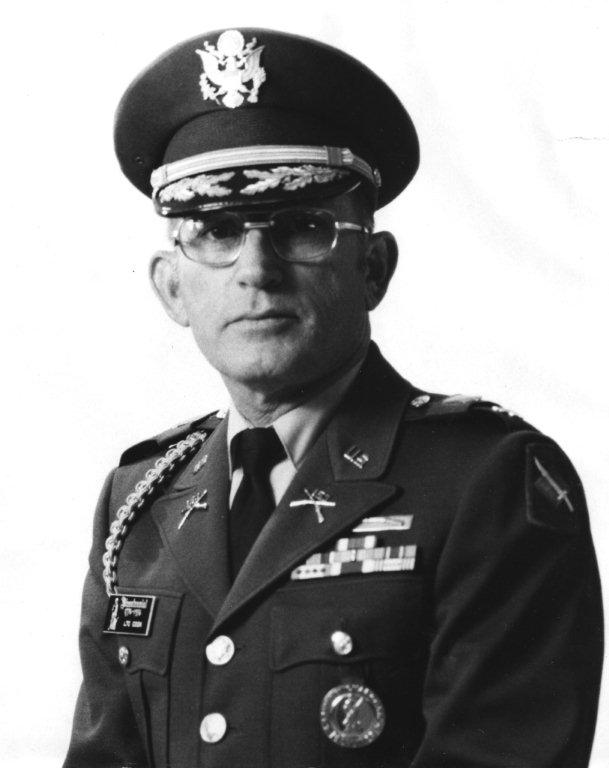
LTC William A. Cook, 1976–78

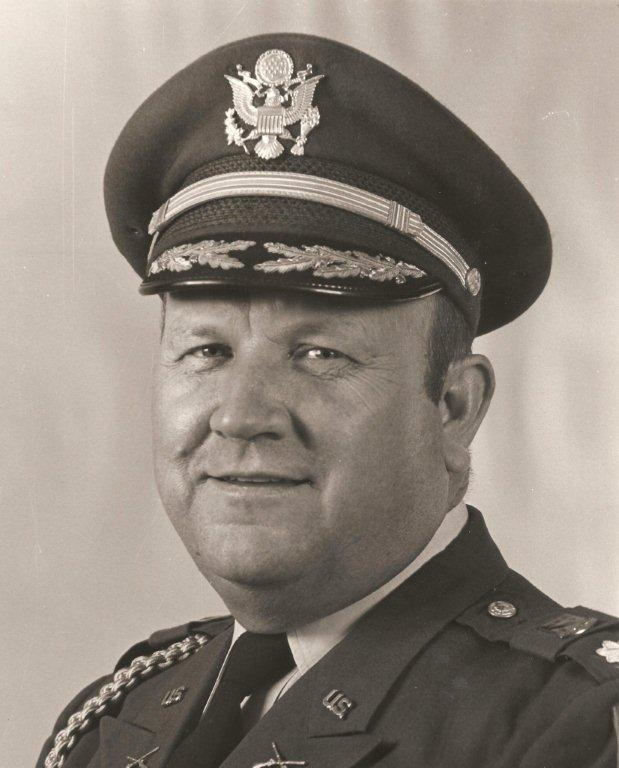
LTC Robert R. Levinis, 1978–79

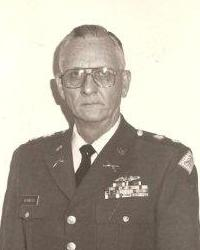
MAJ Larry E. Norwood, 1979

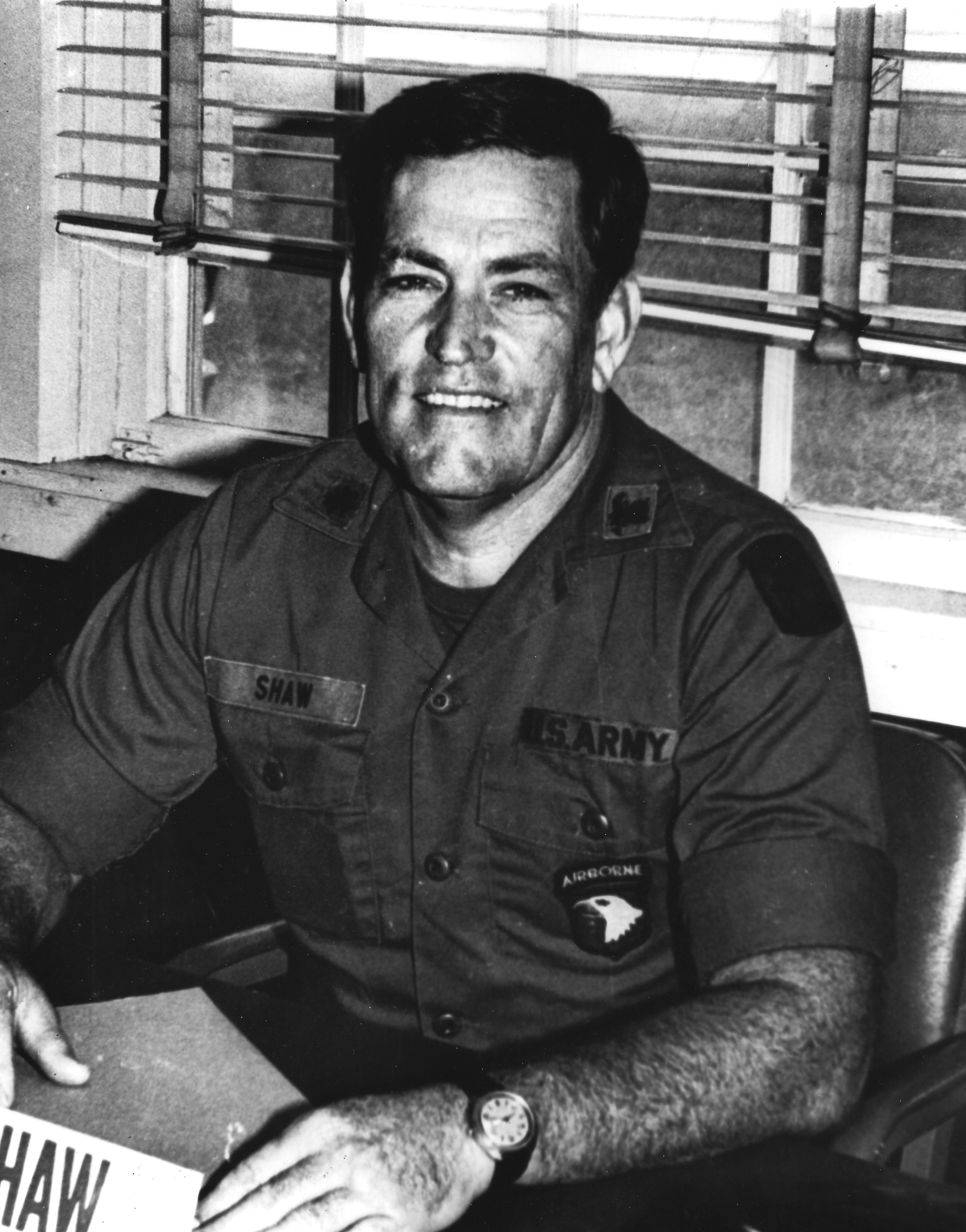
LTC Wallace B. Shaw, 1979–80

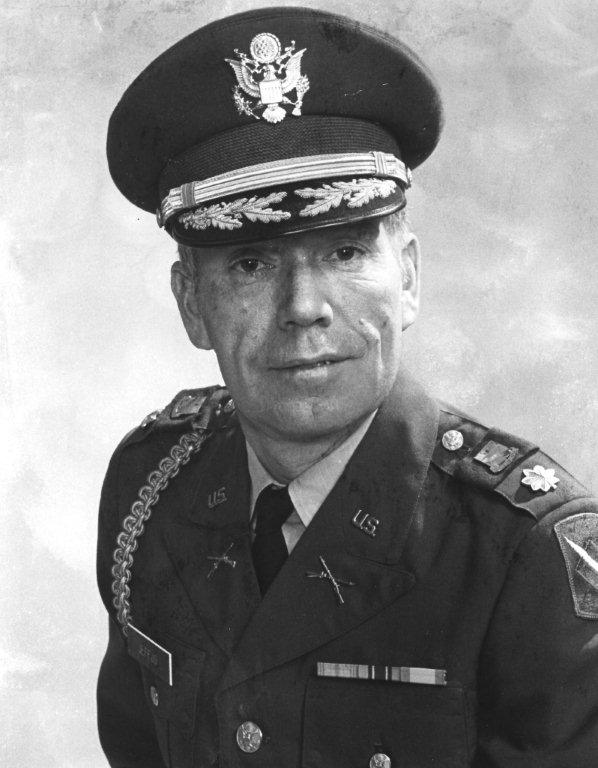
LTC Samuel H. Jeffus, 1980–81

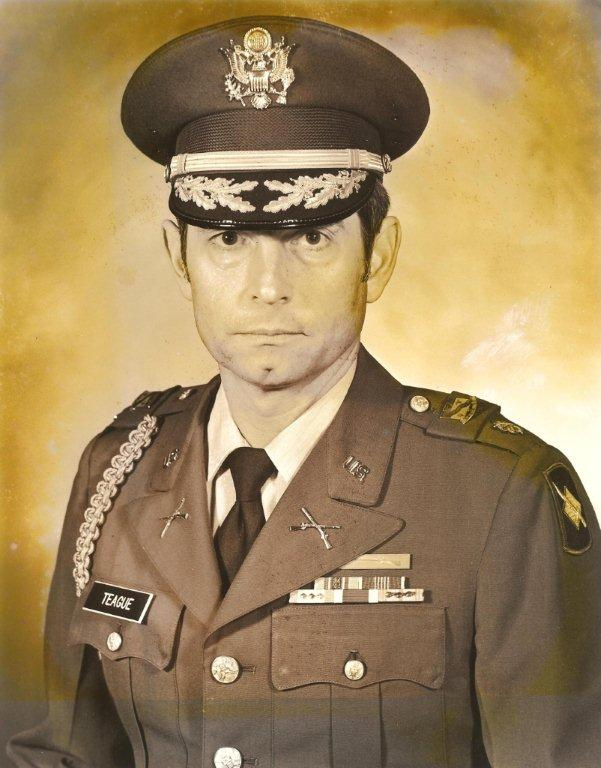
LTC Kenneth P. Teague, 1981–84

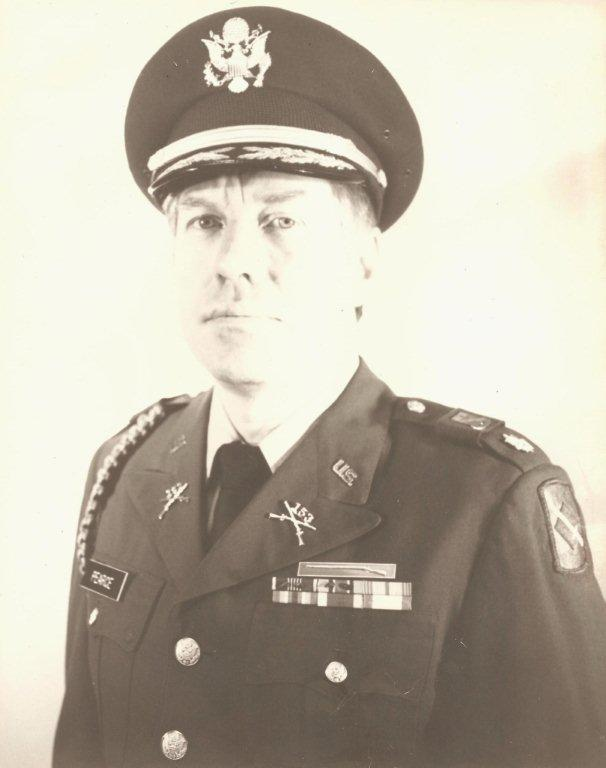
LTC Glen A. Pearce, 1984–87

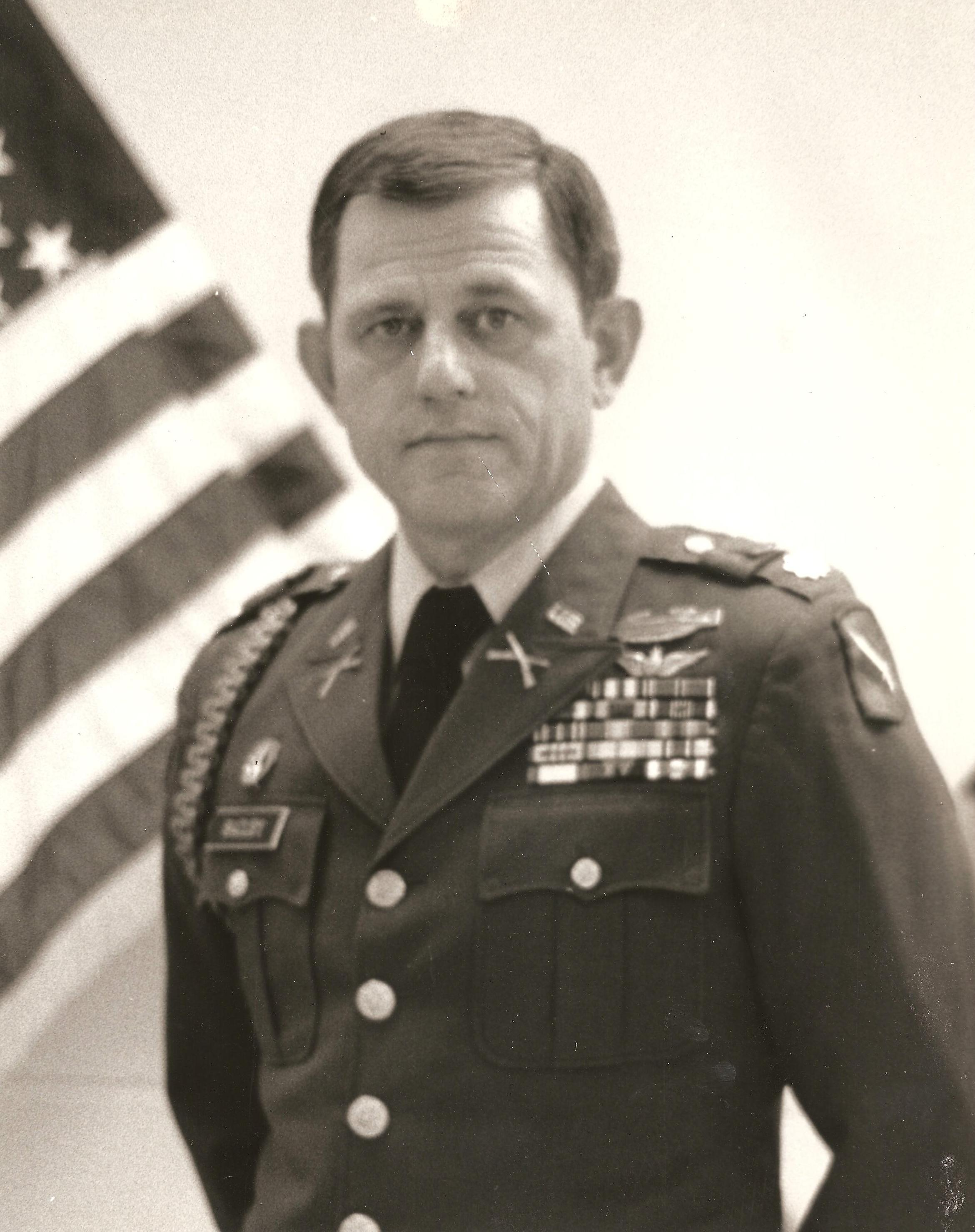
LTC Larry A. Bailey, 1987–89

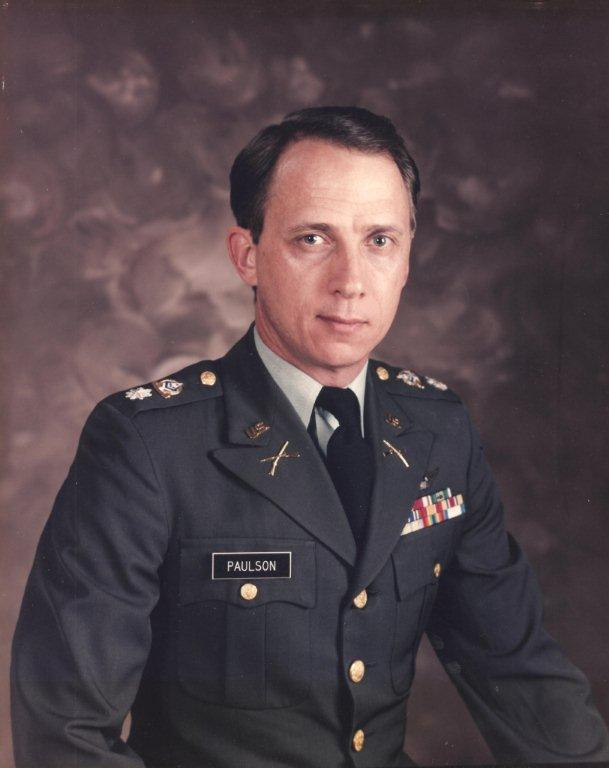
LTC Walter A. Paulson, II, 1989–91

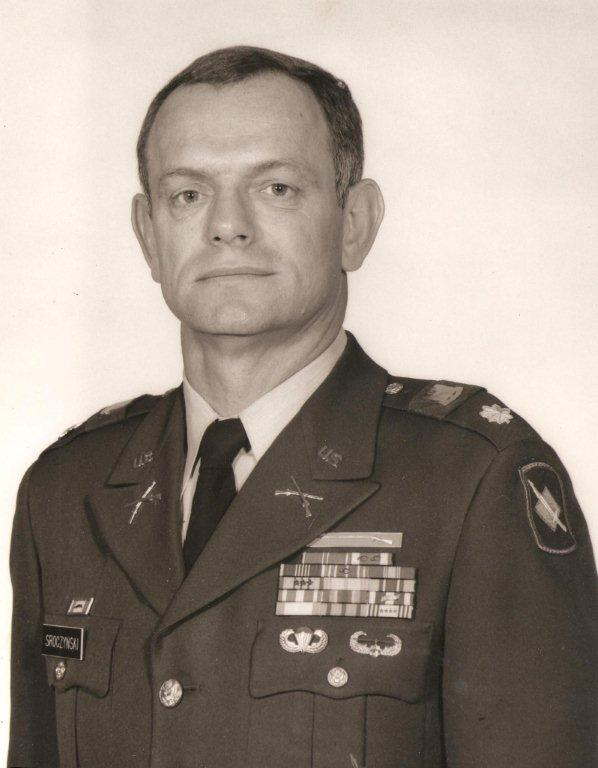
LTC Thariel W. Scorzynski, 1991–92

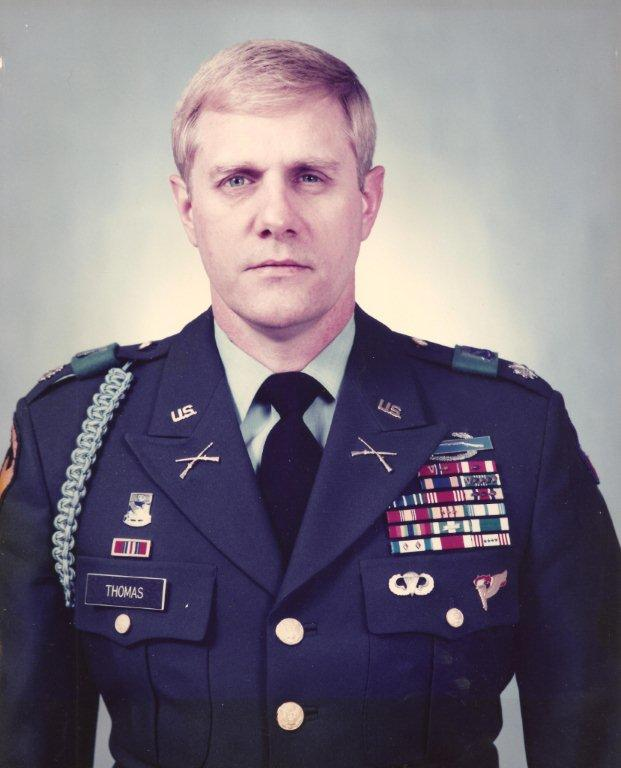
LTC Tom W. Thomas, 1992–94

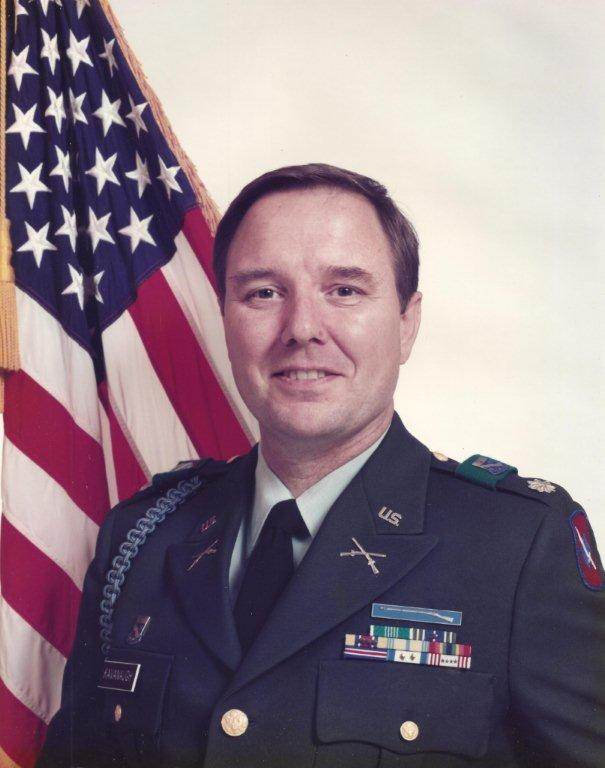
LTC Steven A. Kavanaugh, 1994–95

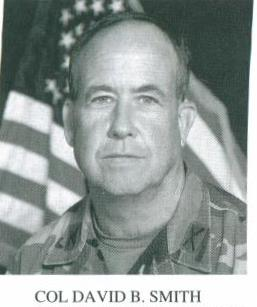
LTC David B. Smith, 1995–97

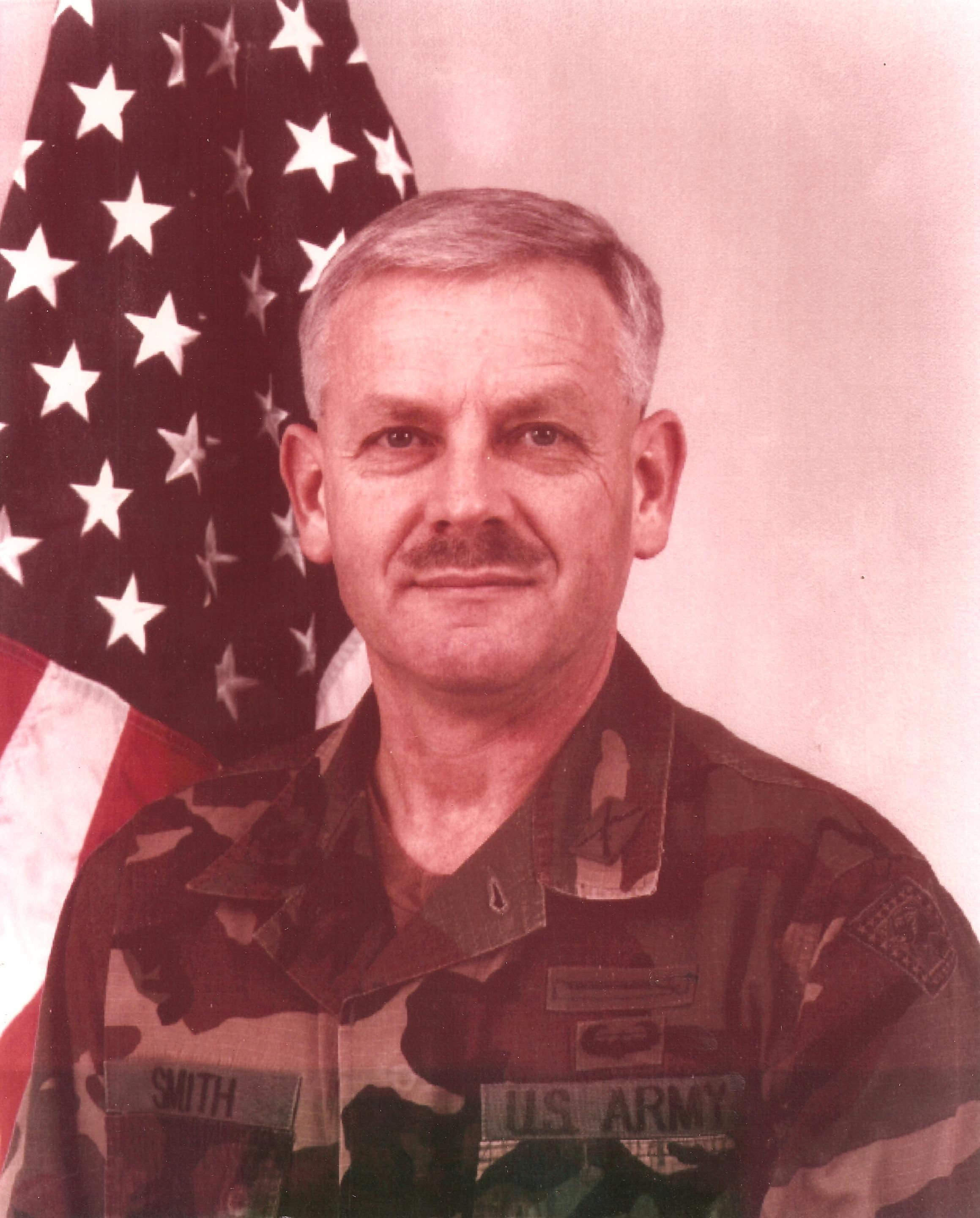
LTC Carlon L. Smith, 1997–99

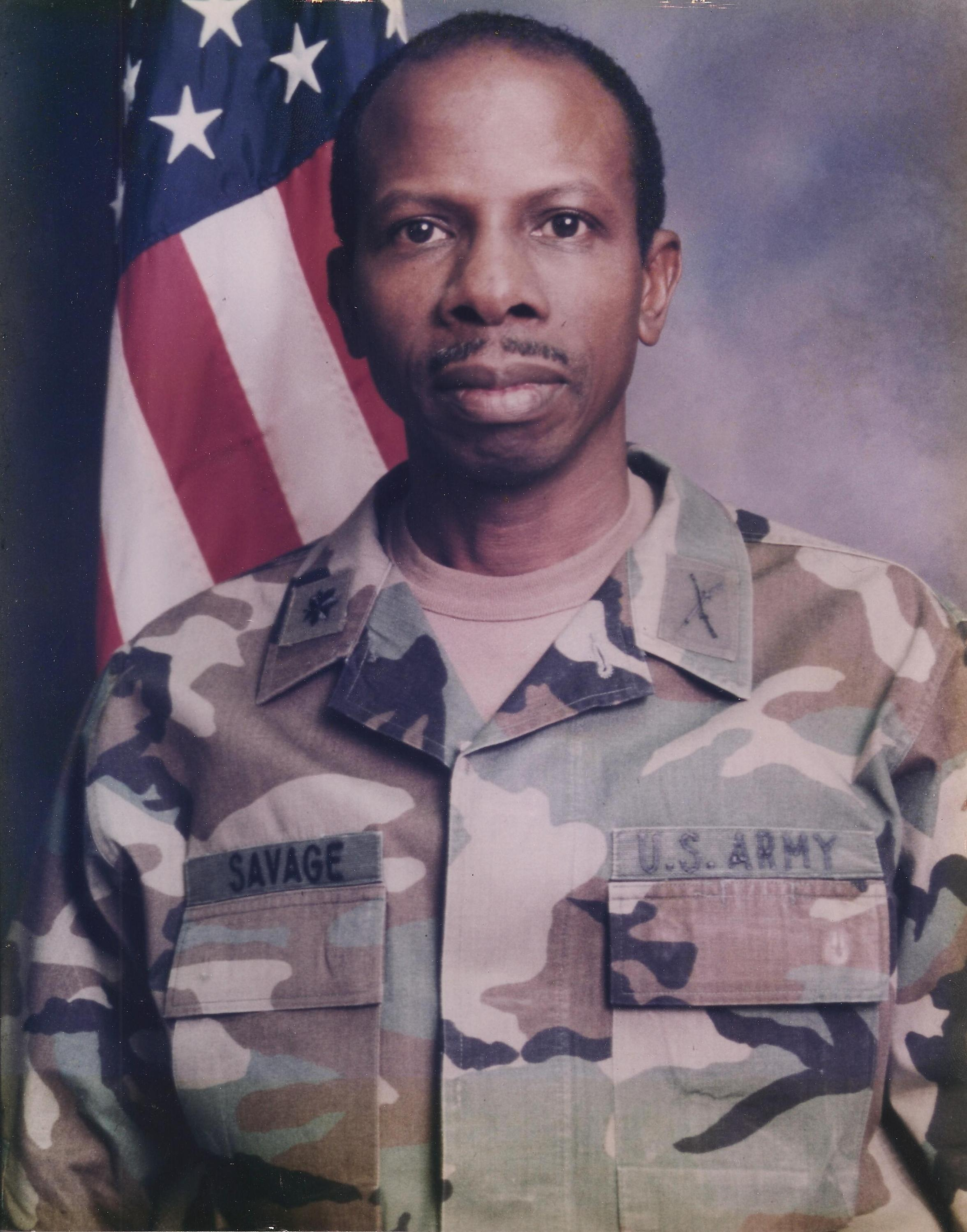
LTC David E. Savage, 1999-2001

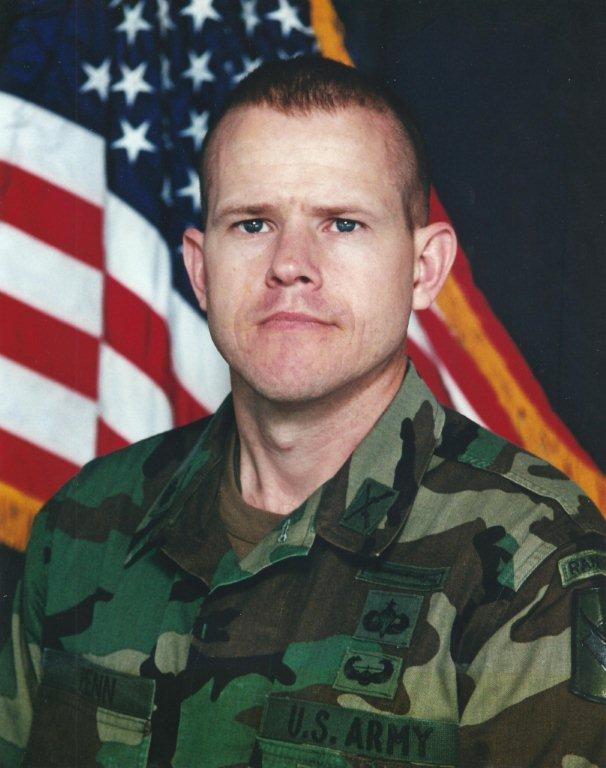
LTC Kendall A. Penn, 2001–05

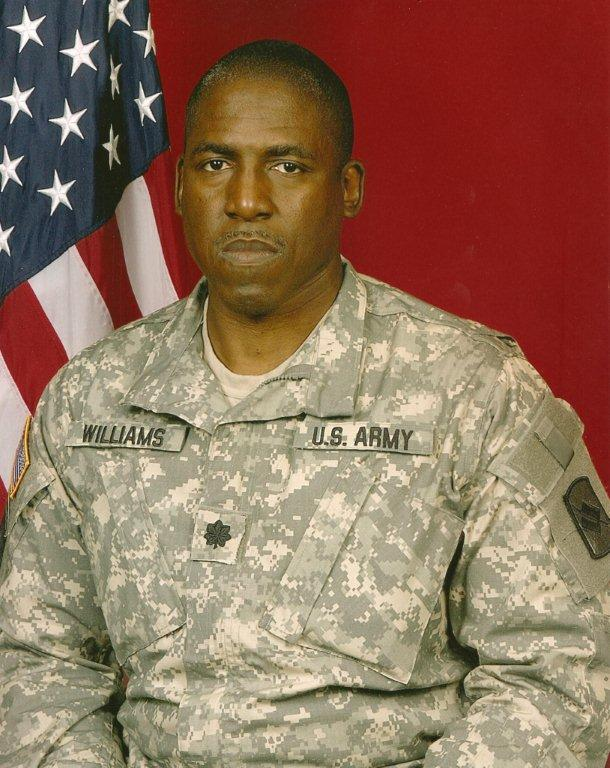
LTC Carnell Williams, 2005–06

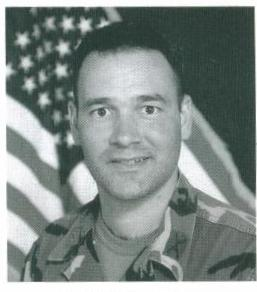
LTC Eddie W. Parnell, 2006–07

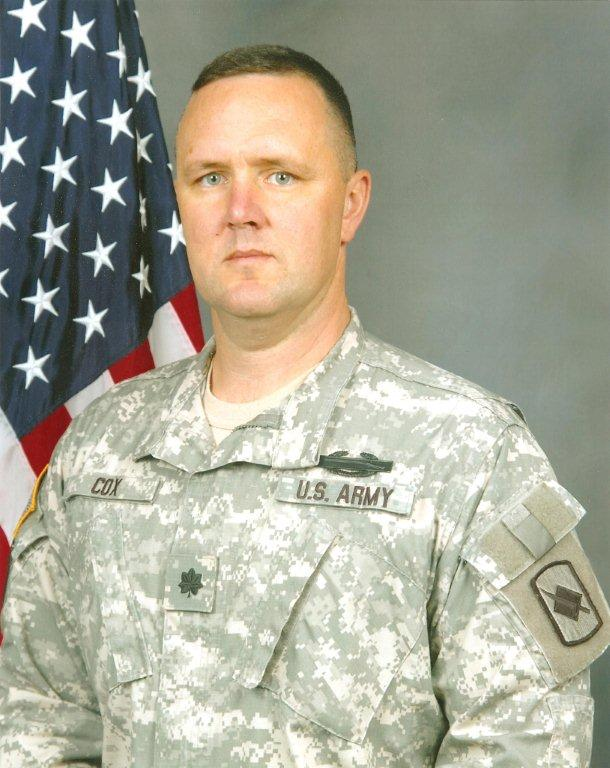
LTC Bradley J. Cox, 2007–09

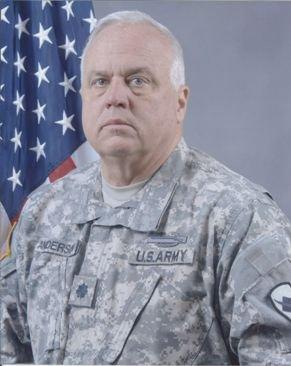
LTC Ronnie D. Anderson, 2009–12

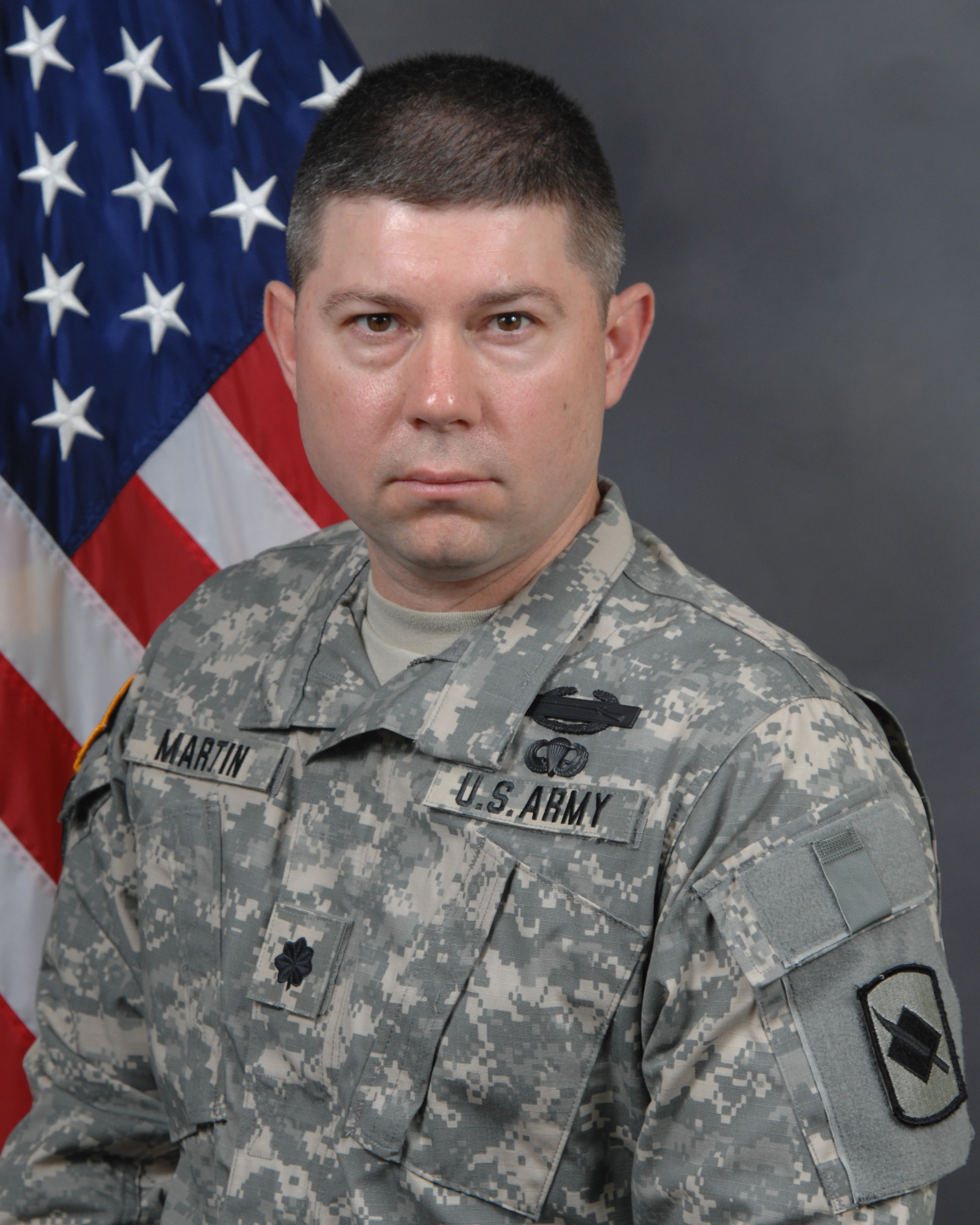
LTC Lynn D. Martin, 2012-2015

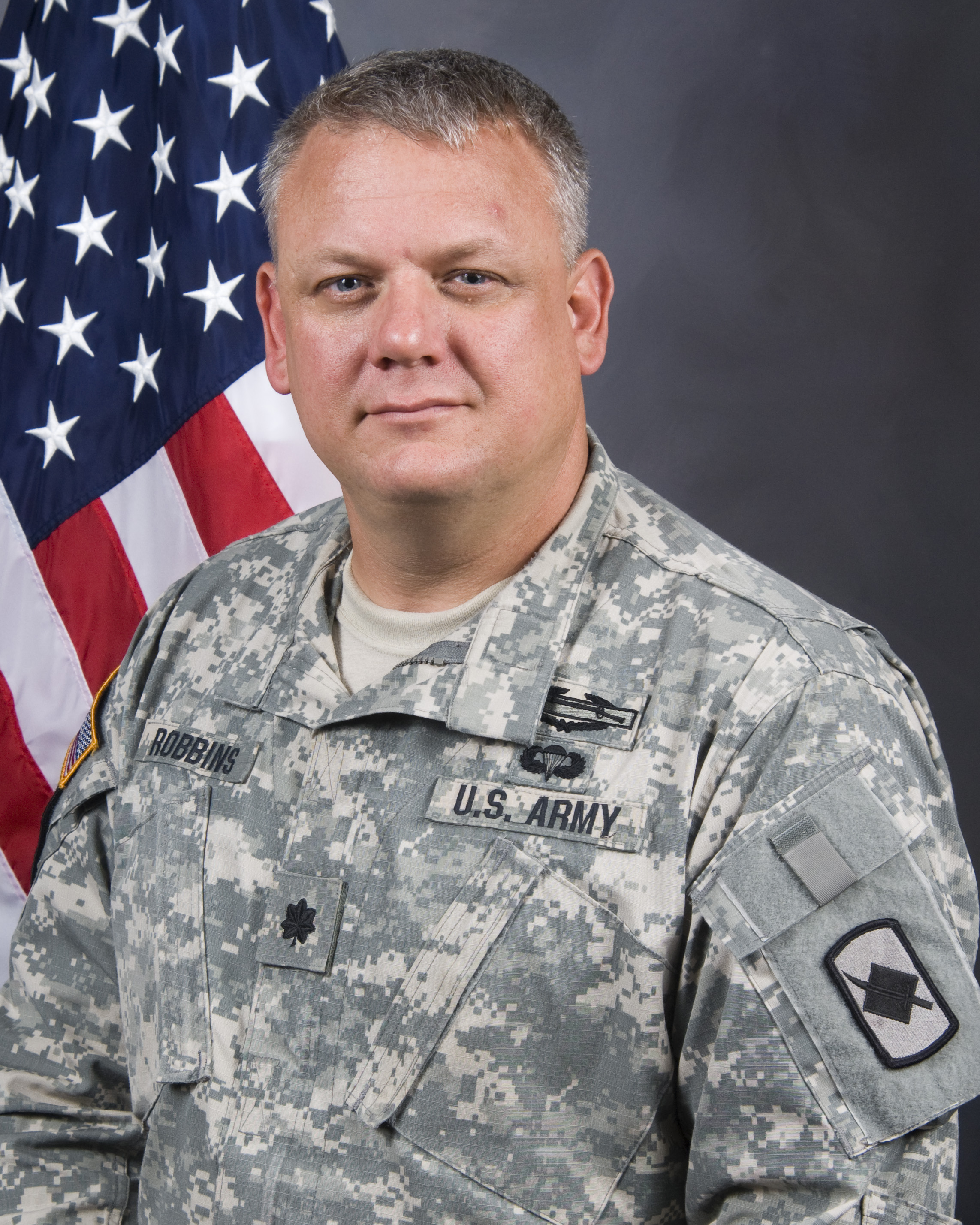
LTC Michael A. Robbins, 2015-2016

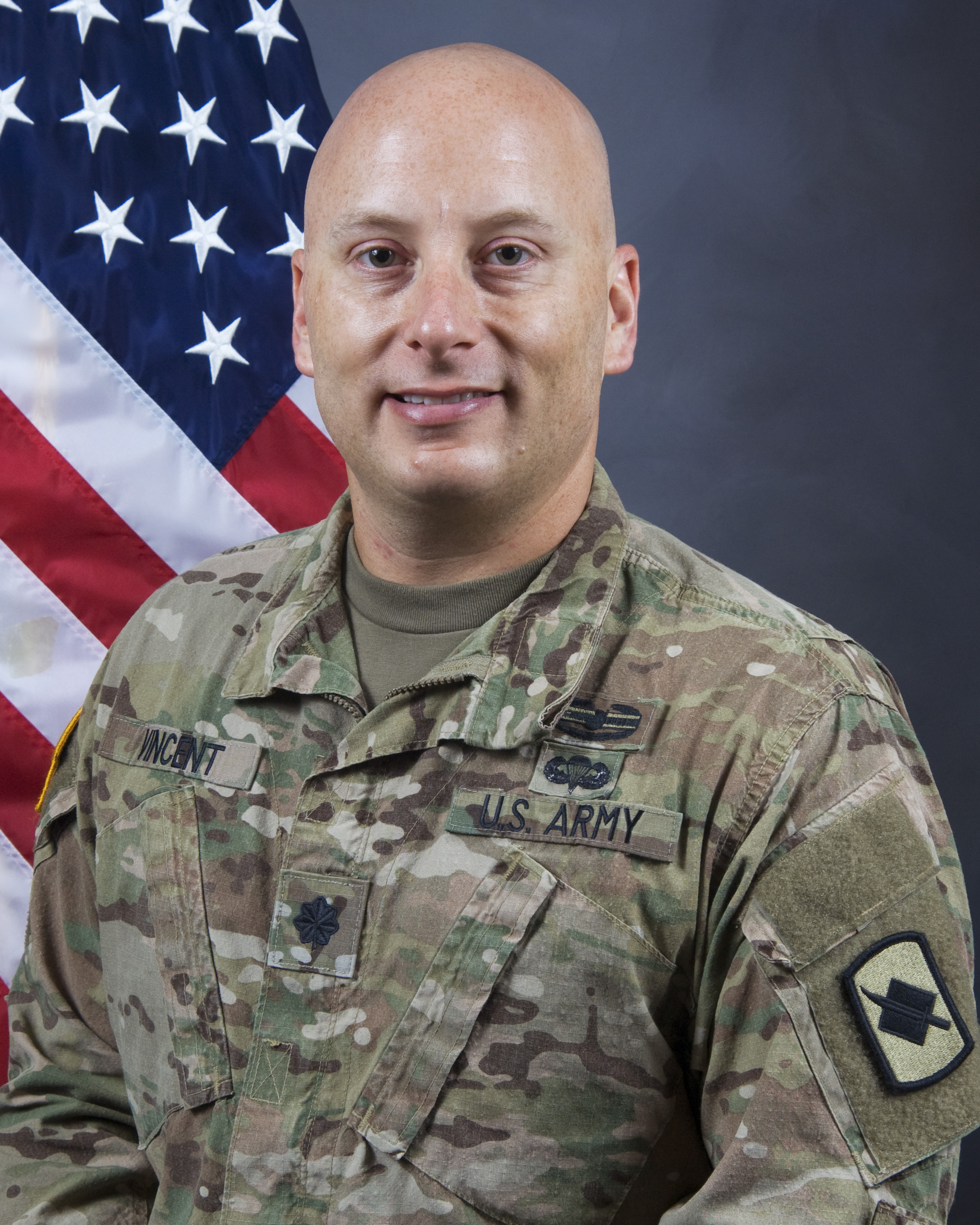
LTC Benjamin J. Vincent, 2016-2017

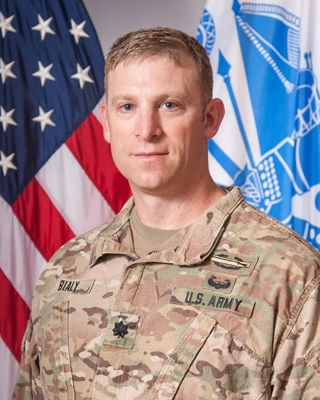
LTC Matthew I. Bialy, 2017-2021

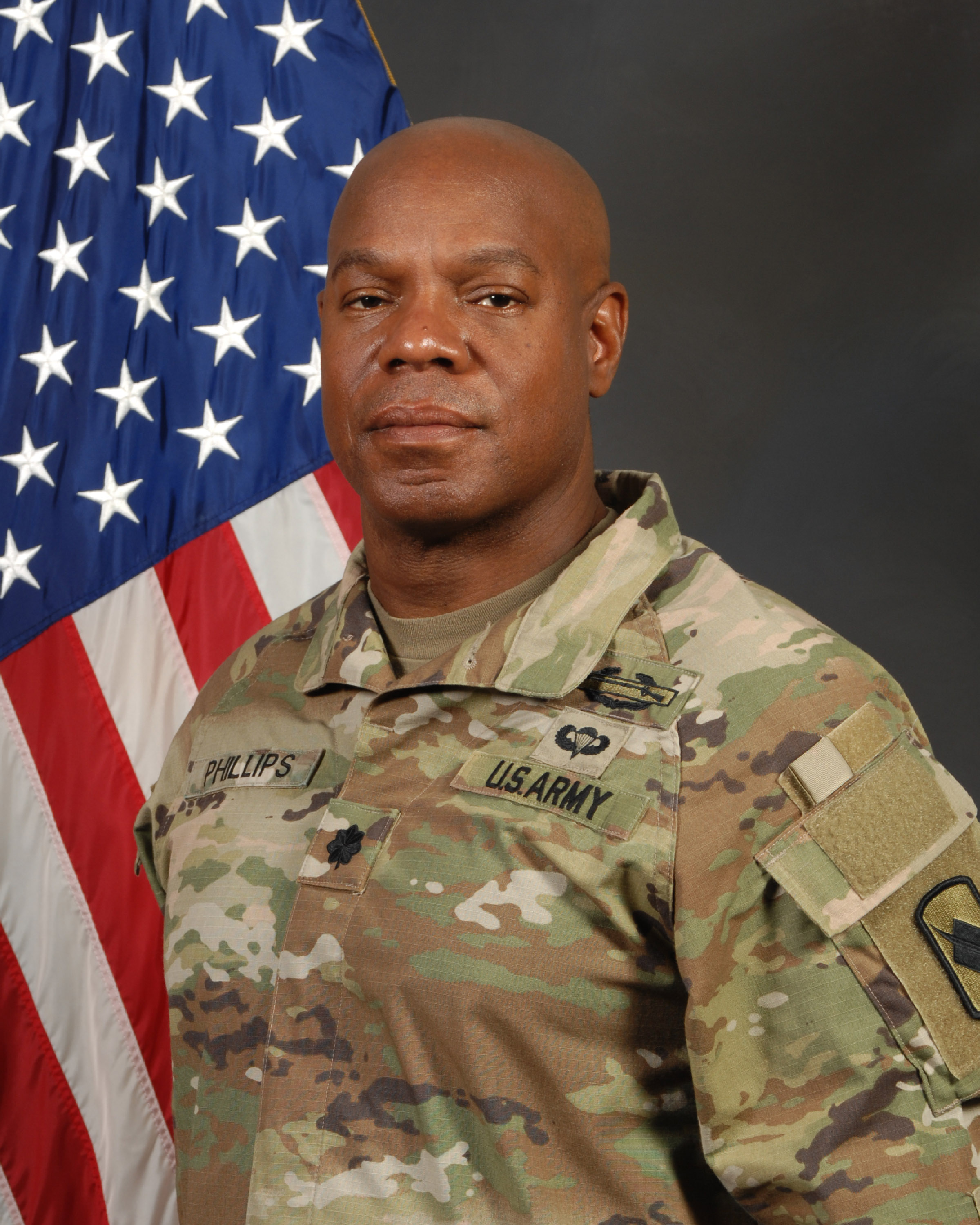
LTC W.B. Phillips II, 2021 to 2024
- LTC Thomas L. Edwards, 2024 to present

== Previous Battalion Command Sergeants Major ==
- CSM Don Cain
- CSM Baker
- CSM Coston
- CSM Larry Doyle
- CSM Nutt, K.
- CSM Steven Veazey
- CSM Rick Megoloff
- CSM Crane
- CSM Paul Winkle
- CSM Marcus Evans
- CSM Tad Washington, 2021 to 2024
- CSM Randy Schnell, 2024 to present

== Current unit locations ==
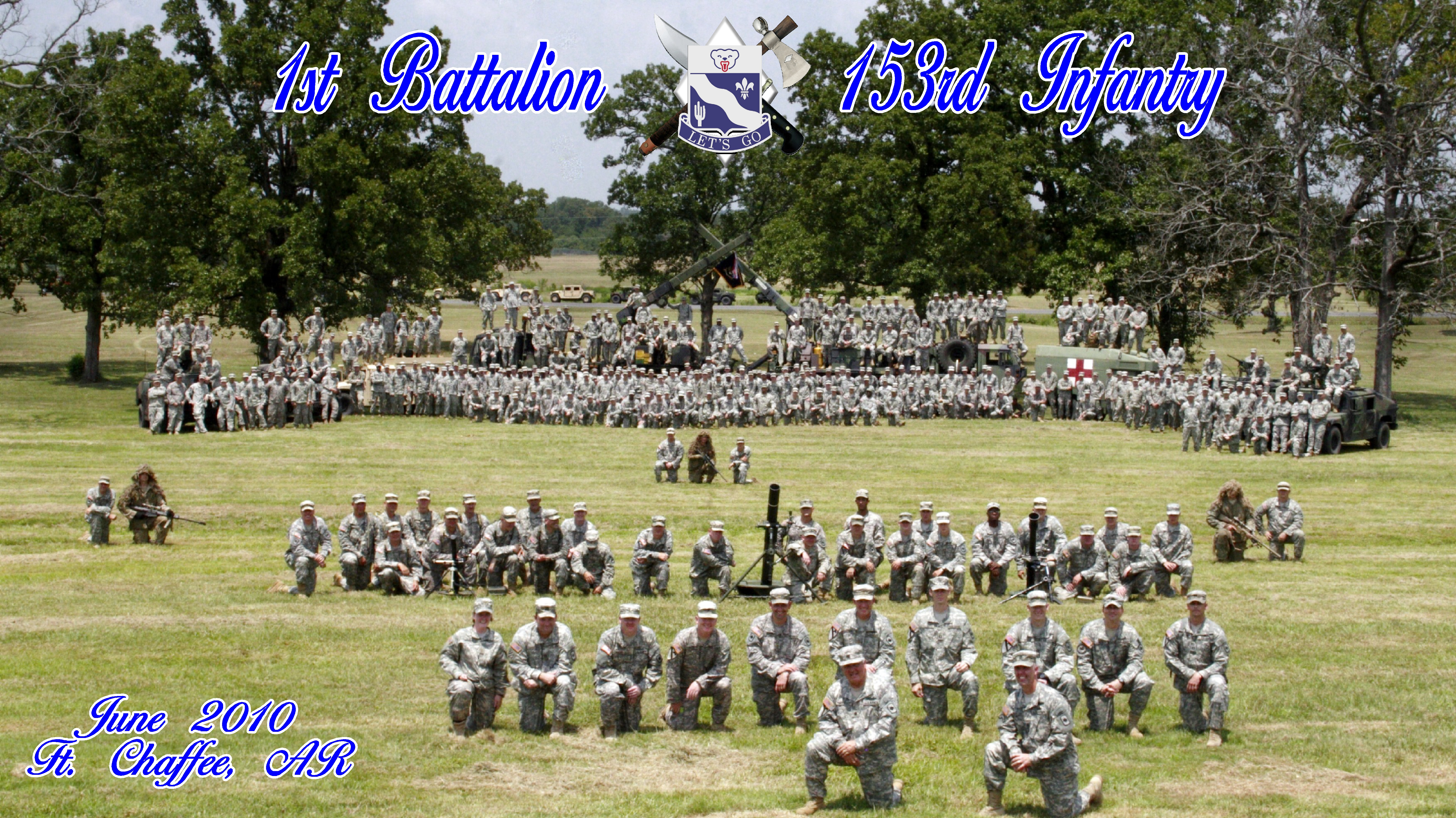
1st Battalion, 153rd Infantry during Annual Training 2010 at Fort Chaffee Arkansas

Unit	Station
Headquarters and Headquarters Company (-)	Malvern
Detachment 1, Headquarters and Headquarters Company	Gum Springs
Company A (-)	Camden
Detachment 1, Company A	Prescott
Company B (-)	Texarkana
Detachment 1, Company B	Hope
Company C (-)	Mena
Detachment 1, Company C	Dequeen
Company D	El Dorado
Company G (Forward Support Company)	Warren

== 153rd Infantry heraldry ==
=== Distinctive unit insignia ===
A silver color metal and enamel device 1 1/8 inches (2.9 cm) in height overall consisting of a shield blazoned Azure, a bend wavy between a fleur-de-lis and a giant cactus Argent; on a chief of the last a Great Bear's face of the like fimbriated of the first, lips and tongue Gules. Attached below the shield is a blue motto scroll inscribed "LET'S GO" in silver letters.

Symbolism: The shield is blue for Infantry. The wavy bend, representing the Arkansas River, refers to the geographic location of the regiment. The cactus symbolizes service on the Mexican border and the fleur-de-lis service in France during World War I. The Great Bear's face from the shoulder sleeve insignia of the Alaskan Department symbolizes service in that area in World War II.

Background: The distinctive unit insignia was originally approved for the 153rd Regiment infantry on 6 January 1930. It was amended on 30 June 1930. On 4 June 1951 the insignia was amended to show additional war service.

=== Coat of arms ===
Blazon: Shield: Azure, a bend wavy between a fleur-de-lis and a giant cactus Argent; on a chief of the last a Great Bear's face of the like fimbriated of the first, lips and tongue Gules.

Crest: That for the regiments of the Arkansas National Guard: On a wreath of the colors (Argent and Azure) above two sprays of apple blossoms Proper a diamond Argent charged with four mullets Azure, one in upper point and three in lower, within a border of the last bearing twenty-five mullets of the second.

Symbolism: The shield is blue for Infantry. The wavy bend, representing the Arkansas River, refers to the geographic location of the regiment. The cactus symbolizes service on the Mexican border and the fleur-de-lis service in France during World War I. The Great Bear's face from the shoulder sleeve insignia of the Alaskan Department symbolizes service in that area in World War II.

Background: The coat of arms was originally approved for the 153rd Regiment Infantry on 6 January 1930. It was amended on 4 June 1951 to show additional war service

== See also ==
- 2nd Battalion, 153rd Infantry Regiment
- 3rd Battalion, 153rd Infantry Regiment
- Arkansas State Guard and the Spanish-American War
- Arkansas National Guard during World War I
- Arkansas National Guard and World War II
- Arkansas Army National Guard and the Cold War
- Arkansas National Guard and the integration of Central High School
- Arkansas Army National Guard and the global war on terrorism
