= Arkansas National Guard during World War I =

The history of the Arkansas National Guard and World War I begins with the reorganization of the Arkansas State Guard following the Spanish–American War. As a result of difficulties encountered during the mobilization of state militia forces, the United States Congress passed new legislation which resulted in the renaming of the Arkansas State Guard as the Arkansas National Guard. The new federal legislation resulted in increased funding and training for the guard. The newly reorganized Arkansas National Guard was call upon by the President to help defend the border with Mexico in 1916 in response to cross border raids during the Mexican Revolution. The Arkansas National Guard had just returned from the Mexican Expedition in 1917 when it was activated for World War I. As a part of their incorporation in the United States Army, all National Guard units were renumbered in accordance with a federal system. The Arkansas National Guard units were incorporated into the 39th Infantry Division and after training at Camp Beauregard, were shipped to France in August and September 1918. The 39th Division was broken up, with some units being used as replacements for other divisions. Most former Arkansas National Guardsmen returned to the United States in February through June 1919 and were demobilized.

== The "Dick" Act ==
The Militia Act of 1903 (32 Stat. 775), also known as the Dick Act, organized the various state militias into the present National Guard system. The act was passed in response to the demonstrated weaknesses in the militia, and in the entire U.S. military in the Spanish–American War of 1898.

U.S. Senator Charles W. F. Dick, a Major General in the Ohio National Guard and the chair of the Committee on the Militia, sponsored the 1903 Act towards the end of the 57th U.S. Congress. Under this legislation, passed January 21, 1903, the organized militia of the States were given federal status to the militia, and required to conform to Regular Army organization within five years. The act also required National Guard units to attend 24 drills and five days annual training a year, and, for the first time, provided for pay for annual training. In return for the increased Federal funding which the act made available, militia units were subject to inspection by Regular Army officers, and had to meet certain standards.

The increase in Federal funding was an important development. In 1808 Congress had allocated $200,000 a year to arm the militia; by 1887, the figure had risen to only $400,000. But in 1906, three years after the passage of the Dick Act, $2,000,000 was allocated to arm the militia; between 1903 and 1916, the Federal government spent $53,000,000 on the Guard, more than the total of the previous hundred years.

In Arkansas, re-organization of the Arkansas State Guard actually began in 1901 under Governor Jeff Davis. Major General W.M. Maynes, in a biannual report dated December 31, 1906, provided an overview of the status of the Arkansas Militia. The Militia was subdivided by statute into parts, (1) the State Guard, or active organize militia: and (2) the Reserve Militia. The State Guard, or regularly enlisted, organized and uniformed militia was at a total strength of 1,274 personnel. The Federal Government appropriated $35,956.86 for the support of the Arkansas State Guard in that year and the Adjutant General asked the General Assembly for a matching appropriation of one half the Federal appropriation.

=== The Arkansas State Guard becomes the Arkansas National Guard ===
Beginning with the passage of the "Dick" Act, the state militia, which had formerly been referred to as the Arkansas State Guard, was henceforth called the Arkansas National Guard. The units of the Arkansas National Guard retained their designations as the 1st Arkansas Infantry, 2nd Arkansas Infantry, etc., until the beginning of World War I, when all National Guard units were redesignated with federal numbers. Also beginning with the "Dick" Act, National Guard units had to meet certain criteria in order to receive "federal recognition". These "federal recognition" dates became critical to establishing a new unit and receiving federal funding.

=== Growth under new organization ===
Several new companies were organized during the period before World War I:.

Company	Station	General Order authorizing
Company K, 1st Infantry	London	General Order 9, dated February 20, 1909
Company M, 1st Infantry	Herber Springs	General Order 10, dated May 2, 1909
Company C, 2nd Infantry	Hope	General Order 11, dated May 25, 1909
Company I, 2nd Infantry	Yellville	General Order 15, dated June 21, 1910

=== Geographic reorganization ===
In 1909 a change was made in the organization of the Arkansas State Guard. For several years, the state had been organized with the 1st Infantry Regiment being stationed north of the Arkansas River and the 2nd Infantry Regiment stationed south of the river. The Adjutant General, General Green determined that the building of railroads and highways had made this stationing plan inefficient and issued General Order No 35 which reorganized the regiments and battalions and changed the letter designations of some of the companies. The regiments were re-stationed so that the 1st Infantry was situated in the eastern part of the state, with its principle "concentration point" being Little Rock, and the 2nd Infantry was stationed in the western part of the state with its "concentration point" at Fort Smith.

Regiment	Unit	Station	Officers	Enlisted
Department Officers		Little Rock	34	
	Brigade Headquarters	Black Rock	4	
1st Regiment	Headquarters	Little Rock	15	5
	Company A	Prescot	3	78
	Company B	Beebe	3	58
	Company C	Hot Springs	3	41
	Company D	El Dorado	3	57
	Company E	Black Rock	3	56
	Company F	Jonesboro	3	64
	Company G	McCrory	2	61
	Company H	Heber Springs	3	42
	Company I	Helena	3	58
	Company K	Lonoke	3	71
	Company L	Piggott	3	61
	Company M	Blytheville	3	55
	1st Regiment Band	Little Rock		28
2nd Regiment	Headquarters Company	Paris	14	6
	Company A	Siloam Springs	3	55
	Company B	Fayetteville	3	52
	Company C	Dardanelle	3	71
	Company D	Eurka Springs	3	57
	Company E	Paris	3	63
	Company F	Magazine	3	61
	Company G	Hope	3	55
	Company H	Atkins	3	61
	Company I	Yellville	3	53
	Company K	Fort Smith	3	42
	Company L	Oin	3	58
	Company M	Harrison	3	60
	2nd Regimental Band	Russellville		27
3rd Regiment Band		Hope		28
	Medical Corps	Little Rock	15	14

=== Regular Army advisers ===
Under Section 30 of the 1903 "Dick" act, the War Department detailed one officer and for duty with the Arkansas National Guard on 10 October 1909. On February 4, 1910, a second NCO was detailed to the Guard and a commissioned officer was added on November 12, 1910.

=== The first permanent military camps ===
The Officer's Association of the Arkansas National Guard held a meeting on November 10, 1909, to discuss the possibility of obtaining suitable land for a permanent military camp to provide a location for training. A committee was formed and bids were received from the cities of Benton, Dardanelle and Beebe. Ultimately an offer from Beebe of 200 acres (0.81 km^{2}) at very little cost to the State was accepted. Camp W. M Haynes was named in honor of a former commanding General. Improvements to this camp were paid for with federal funds. Other ranges were maintained at leased sites including Camp X.O. Findall, in Little Rock; Camp J. N. Wright at Fort Smith; Camp C. B. Gregg in Jonesboro; and Camp John S. Little in Russellville. The State owned no permanent armories during this time but did fund leases for most companies.

=== First annual training encampments ===
With the new Federal funding in place State National Guard units were encouraged to participate in bi-annual encampments with the Regular Army. In 1906 Arkansas sent one provisional regiment to Fort Riley, Kansas, for training. In 1908 a provisional Regiment trained at Leon Springs, Texas. In 1910, Arkansas troops were invited back to Leon Springs, Texas, for a 12-day encampment and the federal government provided $25,000 to defray the costs of the encampment.

Companies A-D-F-H-I and M of the First Infantry and Companies A-B-F-C-I and M of the Second Infantry participated in an encampment at Dardanelle, Arkansas, August 9–18, 1909. The units were trained by members of the 1st Battalion, 16th Infantry, U.S. Army.

== Mexican Expedition 1916 ==
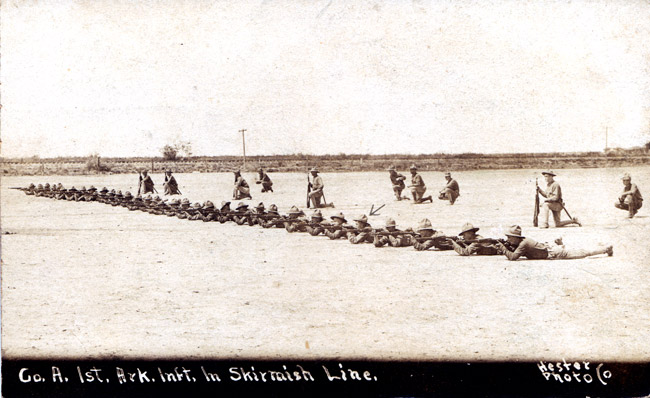
Company A, First Arkansas Infantry, on the skirmish line near Deming, New Mexico, during the 1916 Mexican Expedition

The Mexican Expedition was a military operation conducted by the United States Army against the paramilitary forces of Francisco "Pancho" Villa from 1916 to 1917. The expedition was in retaliation for Villa's illegal incursion into the United States and attack on the village of Columbus, Luna County, New Mexico, during the Mexican Revolution. The United States Army Center of Military History officially refers to the campaign as "the Mexican Expedition". The official beginning and ending dates are March 14, 1916, and February 7, 1917. National Guard units from Texas, Arizona, and New Mexico had been called into service on May 8, 1916. With congressional approval of the National Defense Act of 1916 on June 3, 1916, National Guard units from the remainder of the states and the District of Columbia were also called for duty on the border. By mid-June President Wilson had called out more than 110,000 National Guard for border service. None of the National Guard troops would cross the border into Mexico but were used instead as a show of force.

In July 1916, the entire Arkansas National Guard was mobilized for federal service on the Mexican border. Arkansas units began to assemble immediately at Fort Roots, near Little Rock. Of the 2,078 Guardsmen that answered the call, only 1,208 passed the new physical standards for entry into Federal service. The Arkansas troops received orders on 29 June to move to Deming New Mexico in order to replace regular troops joining the actual expedition into Mexico and prepare if Mexico reacted to the incursion. The Arkansas troops were not engaged in Mexico and returned to Little Rock in February, mustering out of service February 19–24 at Fort Logan H. Roots. This mobilization of the National Guard along the Mexican border was the training ground for many future leaders of the Arkansas National Guard. Many of the officers who led Arkansas National Guard units in the early years of World War I and World War II began their service on the Mexican border.

== World War I ==
=== Status on eve of war ===
When the United States declared war on Germany April 6, 1917, less than two months had passed since the last Arkansas National Guard units completed mustering out from duty on the Mexican border. In March 1917, the Arkansas National Guard had been in danger of having its Federal recognition withdrawn. The problem was scarcity of men Company "E", 1st Arkansas Infantry, Little Rock Company, had only twenty men and should have had thirty-two additional men. The reason for the shortage was the lack of interest of the businessmen of Little Rock. The employers would not let men off for training, thereby discouraging their employees from joining.

=== Mobilization ===
While Congress was debating the declaration of war the 1st Regiment was mobilized for "police duty" on March 31, 1917, and began reporting to Fort Roots in North Little Rock. With the increased speculation of the entry of the United States in the war in Europe, plans for mobilization were published. The War Department initially called the 1st Regiment of the Arkansas National Guard into Federal service for the purpose of police protection. Meanwhile, Governor Charles H. Brough was planning to withhold $25,000 of the State's appropriation to the Arkansas National Guards, hoping that the Federal government would bear the financial burden of the Arkansas National Guard.

The units of the 1st Arkansas were to proceed to Ft. Roots outside of Little Rock for mobilization when the companies had reached the minimum company strength of sixty-five men. The minimum strength was difficult to achieve because of new orders from the War Department mustering out guardsmen with families and those with previous orders. This released all men employed in government work. To counteract the men mustered out, companies were held at their home stations as long as possible to stimulate recruiting. It was known by guard officers that when a company leaves its home station the boys of the community lose interest in joining the guard the fear that they will not be assigned to their local company. Recruiting for the guard was greatly aided when Armour, one of the largest companies in Little Rock, gave the difference between salaries to its regular employees who had enlisted in the Arkansas National Guard before March 31, 1917, and were called into active service. Individuals also were exemplifying patriotism; one man upon learning the need of men for the guards left his work in the fields and walked thirty miles to enlist.

By April 4, 1917, the 1st Arkansas Regiment was ready to move to Little Rock, and company commanders were ordered to report by wire the hour and date they expected to leave their home stations. New companies at Forrest City, Dewitt, Rison, and Fordyce were being organized with the idea of "beating Uncle Sam" and not being drafted. The 2nd Arkansas Regiment was on forty-eight-hour stand by and had not received mobilization orders.

To equip the companies of the 1st Arkansas, U.S. Arsenals sent to Ft. Roots 2,000 rifles, 1,500 uniforms, 2,000 blankets, 1,000 cots, 2,000 pairs of shoes, and 100 pyramidal tents.

Policies were established to cope with men unable to pass physical examinations. It was determined that these men were to be mustered into Federal service, their status remaining the same as those men passing the physical examination. After being mustered into Federal service, the men who were unable to pass the physical examination were given discharges and furnished with transportation to their homes. The 1st Arkansas Infantry was proud of its record of only 12 per cent being discharged because of physical defects. When the 1st Arkansas Infantry was mobilized for duty on the Mexican border 50 per cent of its men were rejected because of Physical defects.

The first military operation the Arkansas National Guard was assigned was a "find and destroy" mission of a "spy" wireless station located somewhere in the Blue Mountains. After searching the area, they found the station on the highest peak in the Ozarks, Mt. Magazine. It was a forgotten and abandoned radio station used by the Government Geodetic Survey Corps. The second military campaign concerning the right of the governor to order a detail of Arkansas National Guards to Bauzite was fought on paper between Colonel James, Commanding Officer of the Arkansas National Guard, and Governor Brough. The need for troops at Bauxite was due to a German flag being flown by a grape grower. Colonel James refused to send troops on the grounds that he took his orders from General Pershing. The matter was settled when the flag disappeared.

The 1st Arkansas was assigned the duty of guarding the State Capital. The Capital contained the arsenal of the Arkansas National Guard. Troops were placed in and around the building. Company "B" (from Beebe), 1st Arkansas Regiment, was camped on the west side of the Capital, having the distinction of being the first company assigned guard duty. Only persons having passes issued by the Secretary of State, T. J. Terral, could be admitted to the Capital and grounds. Four nights later the men from Company "B" could claim another first for their company when two guardsmen fired eight shots and frightened off an intruder.

==== Creation of the 3rd Arkansas Infantry Regiment ====
April 17, 1917, plans for the creation of a new regiment, the 3rd Arkansas were formulated. Enlistments were to be for the duration of the war. On May 16, 1917, it was announced that Little Rock was allowed to have a second infantry company which was part of the 3rd Arkansas Regiment. Recruitment for men in Little Rock was carried out by seventeen girls wearing badges bearing the words, "If You Are A Real Man Enlist." The girls distributed buttonhole tags with, "Are You A Slacker?" The other side of tag read, "Are You A Man?" The girls worked until June 5, 1917, when the draft law became effective. The pay per month for the enlisted men was as follows:

Rank	Pay
Sergeants, First Class	$45
Sergeants	$36
Privates, First Class	$18
Privates	$15
Cooks	$30

To qualify for a commission in the guard an individual had to be a former officer or private of the guard, officer on reserve or unassigned list, active or retired officer of the regular army, navy or marine corps; graduate of the United States military or naval academies or graduate of schools, colleges or university where military science under a regular army officer is taught are eligible for commission.

The age limits that were established for officers of the new units were these:

Rank	Age Requirements
Colonel	21 to 65 years
Lieutenant Colonel	21 to 50 years
Majors	21 to 45 years
Captain	21 to 40 years
First Lieutenant	21 to 30 years.

Rumors that the 1st Arkansas would be assigned to levee and bridge guard duties throughout the state proved to be false when the men were put to work clearing land for a new campsite for the 1st Arkansas. When 7,000 Reserve Officer candidates were sent to Ft. Roots, the 1st Arkansas gave up their barracks for tents. The 1st Arkansas Soldiers were given anti-smallpox and typhoid fever vaccinations. The new duties for the 1st Arkansas was getting the camp in shape by clearing out brush and trees, by working on post roads, and by performing guard duty for the camp.

==== Entire Arkansas National Guard mobilized ====
On May 18, 1917, the Arkansas National Guard was notified that on August 5, 1917, the guard as a whole would be called into Federal service. This announcement caused the 1st Arkansas to start military training. The 1st Arkansas had one-third of the men resume drilling and training while the other men completed the construction on Ft. Root.

It was not all work for the men at Ft. Root, however. The Arkansas soldiers were treated to dances and banquets by the citizens of Little Rock. The men of Company "B" of the 1st Arkansas solicited funds at the Capital and used the money to buy baseball suits and baseball materials. The men also enjoyed a "breezy" newspaper which was devoted to the interest of the Arkansas National Guard and called the Volunteer.

The Arkansas National Guard was initially informed that its units would be assigned to the Eighteenth Division, along with the states of Mississippi and Louisiana, and the state was directed to raise one regiment of infantry, one regiment of field artillery, and one outpost of company signal corps. The men of the Arkansas National Guard trained hard after hearing the news. Intensified cross county hiking, drilling, and maneuvering were evident when the men took sack lunches and marched into Little Rock for the Memorial Day parade with all other troops stationed at Ft. Root.

By July 16, 1917, the Arkansas National Guard included the following:

Regiment	Unit	Station	Officers	Enlisted
Staff Corps	O.M. Corps	Little Rock	3	22
	Ordnance Dept.	Little Rock	1	4
	Medical Corps,	Little Rock	2	5
	Dental Corps,	Little Rock	3	3
1st Regiment	Company A,	Heber Springs	3	166
	Company B,	Beebe	3	149
	Company C,	Arkadelphia	3	97
	Company D,	El Dorado	2	70
	Company E,	Little Rock	3	167
	Company F,	Hope	2	120
	Company G,	Jonesboro	3	99
	Company H,	Marvill	2	98
	Company I,	Warren	2	103
	Company K,	Dermott	3	89
	Company L,	Piggott	3	74
	Company M,	Blytheville	3	196
	Headquarters Company	Little Rock	1	33
	Supply Company,	Little Rock	2	53
	Machine Gun Company,	Little Rock	3	53
	Medical Corps,	Beebe	5	22
2nd Regiment	Company A,	Springdale	3	141
	Company B,	Fayetteville	3	150
	Company C,	Dardanelle	3	115
	Company D,	Fort Smith	3	140
	Company E,	Paris	1	140
	Company G,	Russellville	3	140
	Company H,	Bentonville	2	150
	Company I,	Texarkana	2	119
	Company K,	Ozark	3	120
	Company L,	Oin	3	129
	Company M,	Harrison	3	100
	Headquarters Company,	Paris	2	59
	Supply Company,	Van Buren	3	39
	Machine Gun Company,	Fort Smith	3	71
	Medical Corps,	Little Rock	8	32
3rd Regiment	Company A,	Augusta	3	150
	Company B,	Little Rock	3	150
	Company C,	Hot Springs and Camden	3	160
	Company D,	Morrilton	3	150
	Company E,	Newport	3	150
	Company F,	Batesville	3	160
	Company G,	Walnut Ridge	3	160
	Company H,	Paragould	3	160
	Company I,	Ashdown and Nashville	3	150
	Company K,	Magnoila	3	150
	Company L,	Fordyce	3	150
	Company M,	Clarksville	3	150
	Headquarters Company,	Little Rock	2	97
	Supply Company,	Little Rock	2	37
	Machine Gun Company,	Helena	4	74
	Medical Corps,	Eureka Springs	4	33
Ammunition Train	Headquarters Company,	Little Rock	2	8
	Small Arms Headquarters Company,	Little Rock	1	7
	Artillery Headquarters Company,	Little Rock	2	19
	Company no. 1,	Little Rock	1	55
	Company no. 2,	Helene	1	55
	Company no. 3,	Fort Smith	1	55
	Company no. 4,	Stuttgart	1	55
	Company no. 5,	Stuttgart	1	55
	Company no. 6,	Fort Smith	1	55
	Company no. 7,	Mammoth Spring	1	55
	Company no. 8,	Texarkana	1	55
	Company no. 9,	Forrest City	1	55
	Company no. 10,	Pine Bluff	1	55
	Company no. 11,	Forrest City	1	55
	Company no. 12,	Yellville	1	55
	Ambulance Company,	Hot Springs	5	150
	Field Hospital,	Little Rock	6	72

On July 18, 1917, the Arkansas National Guard was assigned to Alexandria, Louisiana, for training as the Eighteenth Division. Alexandria, Louisiana, is the location of Camp Beauregard. The camp was named after General P. G. T. Beauregard, C.A.A.

By July 24, 1917, Company "B" from Beebe was the only unit of the 1st Arkansas National Guard having a full war quota of Men after physical examination for Federal service. On July 26, 1917, the first guardsman was killed when James Voinche, Company I, 1st Arkansas Infantry, was killed by a streetcar in Little Rock.

By August 1917, the 1st Arkansas had become proficient in firing rifles and had practiced with bayoneting dummies. The machine gun company went to Pinnacle Mountain for target practice. The chaplain of the 1st Arkansas was preparing to keep the regiment's history. Because Ft. Root was designated a base hospital, the men of the 1st Arkansas were transferred from Ft. Root to Camp Pike, adjacent to Ft. Root, and were permitted to sleep in the barracks. The tents were packed by the men with hopes that they would not be unpacked until arrival in France.

The 2nd and 3rd Infantry Regiments were examined for Federal service on August 6, 1917, at Ft. Brough (located on the Capital grounds). The regiments, under the control of General Wood, were sent to Ft. Roots and moved to Camp Pike by August 24, 1917. The Commander of the supply company of the 3rd Arkansas received instructions from the Augusta Arsenal to go into the open market and buy mess kits to complete the needed equipment for the new regiments.

Arkansas was proud when the 1st Arkansas Regiment Band appeared in a War Department film. But Arkansas was doubly proud when the largest Southwest parade in over thirty years was held in Little Rock in which the Eighty-seventh Division, Arkansas National Guard, National Army, and the Iowa Field Artillery participated. This was the last parade in the state of Arkansas for many members of the Arkansas National Guard.

=== Movement to Camp Beauregard ===
In late September, 1917, the Arkansas National Guard moved by train to Camp Beauregard in Alexandria, Louisiana. The trip took about fourteen hours. The 3rd Arkansas regiment used the following railroad equipment:

Sixty coaches, three standard pullmans, six baggage cars, twelve boxcars, and one stock car.

==== Re-numbering and loss of state designations ====
The Arkansas troops were demobilized after their transfer to Camp Beauregard, and reorganization of the troops was made under a new system of organization worked out by the commanding officer at Camp Beauregard. The 18th Division was redesignated as the 39th Division. At this time all National Guard units were stripped of their state designations and re-numbered under a new Federal system:

- The 1st Arkansas Infantry Regiment became the 153rd Infantry Regiment,
- the 2nd Arkansas Infantry Regiment, minus its machine gun company became the 142nd Field Artillery Regiment,
- the 3rd Arkansas Infantry Regiment, minus the 3rd Battalion, was redesignated the 154th Infantry Regiment,
- The 3rd Battalion, 3rd Arkansas Infantry and the Machine Gun Company from the 2nd Arkansas were organized as the 141st Machine Gun Battalion,
- the 1st Arkansas Ammunition Train became the 114th Ammunition Train,
- the 1st Arkansas Ambulance Company and the 1st Arkansas Field Hospital became the 114th Sanitary Trains

The 39th "Delta" Division was composed of the:

- Seventy-seventh Infantry Brigade (153rd Infantry, 154th Infantry, and the 141st Machine Gun Battalion);
- the Seventy-eight Infantry Brigade (155th Infantry, 156th Infantry, 142nd Machine Gun Battalion);
- Sixty-fourth Field Artillery Brigade (140th Field Artillery, 141st Field Artillery, 142nd Field Artillery, and the 114th Trench Mortar Battery);
- the Divisional Troops (140th Machine Gun Battalion, 114th Engineers, 114th Field Signal Battalion and Headquarters Troop); and,
- Trains (114th Train Headquarters and Military Police, 114th Ammunition Train, 114th Supply Train, 114th Engineer Train, and the 114th Sanitary Train. The 39th Division was brought up to strength with the addition of soldiers from Ohio, Illinois, and Kentucky.

The ability of the Arkansas to fight was soon proven when a free-for-all fight between soldiers from Louisiana and Arkansas developed in a dance hall. The combatants were placed in the guardhouse. A Louisiana soldier had brushed against an Arkansas soldier and caused the uproar.

When the 2nd Arkansas Infantry Regiment was changed to artillery, the blue hat cord was changed to red and the collar insignia was changed from the crossed rifles to crossed cannon. But the big change was from the rifle to the six-inch howitzer, which was used in shelling enemy positions. It took eight horses to pull one of the big cannons. After several months of classroom training, the 142nd began live fire on the horse drawn 4.7 inch weapon in April 1918. After two and one-half months in the field conducting live fire training, the 142nd was certified for overseas service.

Sickness was a problem for the men from Arkansas. Measles in the later part of October 1917, kept the men from drilling. Regardless, in January 1918, the National Guard Reserve was transferred to the active list. Also in the same month, Alexandria, Louisiana, was placed off limits, and soldiers could not visit other regiments because of an outbreak of meningitis. To help matters, the soldiers were instructed in the use of deadly gases and then exposed to tear gas. The off limits lasted until March 6, 1918, for the soldiers concerning Alexandria. The soldiers complained about the bugs and were anxious to go to France. By March 1918, the soldiers had received new Enfield rifles. In early October, 1918, Camp Beauregard was struck with Spanish influenza which lead into lobar pneumonia. All available facilities were used when the hospitals became overcrowded.

The 114th Engineers made an enviable record by building and improving the roads in and about the camp. By April 1918, the roads built in the swamps and hills of "Dogville-in-the-Pines" (the nickname given to Camp Beauregard) were completed, and the men were taking physicals for overseas.

Arkansas troops passed in review for the first time in February for Arkansas Adjutant-General England, and the entire 39th Division passed in review in April for the Governors of Mississippi and Louisiana. On the day after the parade, the Arkansas soldiers learned that they could not vote outside of the state of Arkansas. If they could return to their local residence before or on the voting date, they could vote according to the Attorney-General's opinion.

==== Replacement Operations ====
The United States Army had yet to develop a system to mobilized, train and deploy individual replacements. The United States units already serving in France were experiencing losses, with no way to replace them. In May, 1918, up to 5000 soldiers, or 20 percent of the division, were given the opportunity to volunteer for duty overseas. In the rush to reach the combat theater, some officers resigned their commissions so they would be qualified for duty overseas before the war was over. These replacements reached France in June, 1918. 20 per cent of the enlisted personnel of the 153rd (old 1st Arkansas) and 154th (composed of part of the old 2nd and 3rd Arkansas) Infantry, the 142nd (part of the old 2nd Arkansas) Field Artillery, and the 141st (part of the old 2nd Arkansas) Machine Gun Battalion, had been allowed to volunteer for early deployment. The movement consisted of only 20 percent of each organization, and the officers did not accompany their troops but remained at Camp Beauregard with the other 80 per cent still in training. At Camp Beauregard the division was brought to full strength by the arrival of troops from Camp Zachary Taylor (men from the states of Ohio, Illinois, and Kentucky.)

Shortly thereafter, Private Robert Springer was the first state guardsman to die in France. In a letter home a guardsman from the old Company "I" of the 1st Arkansas National Guard, described the fighting and sent a coat lapel which belonged to the best soldier for the Crown Prince. He stated that the German soldiers were best at running. About the same time letters were being received in Arkansas from soldiers of the old 1st and 3rd Arkansas National Guard Regiments.

At the time of its departure from the United States, the 39th Division was composed of 22 per cent Arkansas National Guard, 40 per cent National Army draftees, and 10 per cent shortage from authorized strength. On August 1, 1918, the division entrained for the port of embarkation and sailed for overseas service on August 6, 1918.

=== 39th Division ships to France ===
The 39th Division, less its artillery units, left Camp Beauregard August 1, 1918, and sailed for overseas service August 6, 1918. The first unit of the 39th Division arrived in France on August 12, 1918, and the last unit arrived on September 12, 1918. It was then sent to the St. Florent area, southwest of Bourges, where it was designated as a replacement division. In November 1918, it moved to St. Aignan. There several of the units were transferred to combat divisions. The Division was never a front line division; therefore, it never advanced any miles nor captured any prisoners nor received any replacements. The Division was designated as the Fifth Depot Division on August 14, 1918, and moved to Charost and Mehun-sur-Yeure Area southwest of Bourges. The units of the Division for the most part were training cadres whose duties were to receive, train, equip, and forward replacements of both officers and men for the infantry units, machine gun units, and for ammunition and supply trains. On October 29, 1918, orders directed that the Division be attached to the 1st Depot Division at St-Aignan-Noyers and Loir-et-Cher.

The 142nd Field Artillery Regiment sailed for France August 31, 1918, and arrived September 7. After arrival in France, the 142nd drew equipment and began training on the tractor drawn 155mm howitzer. The 142nd was certified for combat November 8, 1918, and the Armistice was signed on the 11th, preventing the 142nd from participating in combat.

The 1st unit of the division arrived in France on August 12, 1918, and the last unit arrived on September 12, 1918. It was then sent to the St. Florent area, southwest of Bourges, where it was designated as a replacement division. In November, 1918, it moved to St. Aignan. There several of the units were transferred to combat divisions.

In March 1919, the 1st Battalion, 142nd Artillery, 39th Division was acting as a school battalion for the entire artillery forces of the American Expeditionary Forces with their headquarters at Valdahon, France. On April 12, 1919, the transport Kiserin Auguste Victoria brought the Sixty-fourth Field Artillery Brigade and the 141st Field Artillery Battalion of the 39th Division to New York. The headquarters ordnance and medical detachments and some companies of the 114th Engineers, 39th Division were transported to Newport News, Virginia, on the battleship Nebraska. The 114th Engineers, 39th Division, were transferred to the 1st Army Corps in France. The 114th Engineers operated in the Meuse-Argonne drive, laying railroad and building bridges for the 1st Army Corps during the battle.

=== Demobilization ===
Most former Arkansas guardsmen began returning to the United States during January and February 1919. The Division returned to the United States for demobilization during the period between November 30, 1919, and May 1, 1919. The Division demobilized the following month at Camp Beauregard, Louisiana. With the war ended, the 153rd Infantry landed in Hoboken, New Jersey, February 27, 1919, making the crossing aboard the USS President Grant.

On April 12, 1919, the transport SS Kaiserin Auguste Victoria brought the Sixty-fourth Field Artillery Brigade and the 141st Machine Gun Battalion of the 39th Division to New York. The headquarters ordnance and medical detachments and some companies of the 114th Engineers, 39th Division were transported to Newport News, Virginia, on the battleship Nebraska. The 114th Engineers, 39th Division, were transferred to the 1st Army Corps in France. The 114th Engineers operated in the Meuse-Argonne drive, laying railroad and building bridges for the 1st Army Corps during the battle.

The 142nd stayed in France to conduct tests and exercises to develop techniques for motorized artillery battalions and won a commendation for efficient performance. In March 1919, the 1st Battalion, 142nd Artillery, 39th Division was acting as a school battalion for the entire artillery forces of the American Expeditionary Forces with their headquarters at Valdahon, France. In May, 1919, word reached Little Rock that the 142nd Field Artillery Battalion (old 2nd Arkansas) was doing convoy duty with the Army of Occupation and a segment was still firing for the Artillery School at Camp Valdahon. It was not until early June when the 142nd Field Artillery left France on the transport USS Amphion to arrive June 15, 1919, at Newport News, Virginia. On the train trip to Little Rock the 142nd Field Artillery was asked to march in a parade in Atlanta. This they were proud to do. On June 21, 1919, the group arrived at Camp Pike. On the following day the 142nd Field Artillery was featured in a big parade in Little Rock and then treated to a big show and picnic in the park.

The last group of Arkansas Guardsmen to return to the state for discharge was the 114th Sanitary Train (formerly the 1st Arkansas Ambulance Company and the 1st Arkansas Field Hospital), Seventh Army Corps. The 114th Sanitary Train had been stationed for six months at Wittlick, Germany, before being transferred back to the United States.

=== Organization on the home front ===
The Militia Bureau of the War Department on May 3, 1918, authorized the formation of the Fourth Arkansas Infantry Regiment. The organization was not to be called into Federal service but to be kept complete and ready for any emergency. Men of draft age were not urged to join. The status of the Fourth Arkansas Infantry was the same as the Arkansas National Guard before its calling into the Federal service. On July 8, 1918, at the request of the sheriffs of Cleburne, Faulkner, and White counties, an officer and thirty men of Machine Gun Company, Fourth Arkansas Infantry, proceeded to the vicinity of Pearson, Arkansas, for the purpose of assisting the sheriffs of these counties in the apprehension of draft resisters, slackers, and deserters. The following day, an investigation team of Arkansas National Guard officers was sent to Heber Springs, Arkansas, in Cleburne County to investigate the disorderly conditions said to exist in the county and which the county authorities reported they were unable to suppress. In April 1919, the Fourth Arkansas National Guard Regiment planned to reorganize because of lack of personnel. The draft reduced the Fourth Arkansas ranks in both officers and enlisted men. The regiment was never put into Federal service.

=== Demobilization of the Guard following WWI ===
In the last half of the 20th century, mobilizations involved a fairly seamless change from state control of a unit to federal control and then back to state control at the end of the mobilization, with the unit remaining intact and individual members' enlistment status remaining unchanged. In the first half of the 20th century, this was not the case. From World War I through the Korean War, soldiers were demobilized and discharged as individuals at the end of a mobilization and the units effectively passed out of existence, at least for a time, only to be reconstituted, months or years later, in the Arkansas Army National Guard. This complicated state efforts to rapidly re-organize the Arkansas National Guard following World War I. The individual soldiers being demobilized in 1919 with returning Arkansas units were not only demobilized, but were discharged from service and were told that they were released from any further obligation to serve in the Arkansas National Guard.

On January 1, 1919, the Arkansas National Guard consisted of the Fourth Arkansas Infantry and the First Arkansas Engineers, the only units which had not been federalized for the war effort. These units however were just paper shells, the majority of their members having been inducted into federal service through the draft. During the war, the state had also created the Home Guard units in order to provide the governor with a response force for state emergencies. The first Home Guard units were created in September 1917 and at its height, the Home Guard consisted of 64 companies. The Home Guard was demobilized and its officers ordered to turn in all weapons and equipment under General Orders Number 17, dated December 2, 1920.

On July 17, 1919, the First World War era was over when orders from the War Department instructed the Adjutant-General to organize a militia regiment of infantry to return to guard the Mexican border.

== Significant state missions ==
In February 1909 a tornado struck the city of Brinkley. The governor ordered the National Guard to provide 30 tents and 300 blankets to the survivors. Two companies, Company G, First Infantry from McCrory and Company I, First Infantry, from Helena were sent to Brinkley under the command of MAJ L.P. Berry to assist with maintaining order.

On February 26, 1910, Company D, First Infantry, located at El Dorado received a call from the governor to supply troops to help prevent violence after the alleged shooting of a white citizen by a black citizen. CPT Crowford was ordered to report to the Sheriff with his company for duty. In less than an hour Crawford reported by telegraph that as of 10:15 p.m, he had 20 men on duty, and again later that he had 35 men on duty. The following morning at 8:15, CPT Crawford reported that he had the alleged shooter in custody and all was quiet.

On February 27, 1910, the Sheriff of Garland county asked for troops to prevent an attempt to lynch an African American who was accused of rape and to protect the defendant during trial. CPT William A. Smith Company A, First Infantry from Prescott to take 10 of his men to Hot Springs and protect the defendant. The trial concluded without violence. In May 1927 the 206th Coast Artillery's Capt. Harry Smith was commended by the Little Rock Chamber of Commerce for breaking up the a mob that had rioted after a Ku Klux Klan group staged a lynching in the city.

The 206th Coast Artillery was called to state active duty to support the citizens of eastern Arkansas during the Arkansas River Floods of 1927 and 1937. The regiment was responsible for setting up to refugee camps and providing relief to thousands of survivors. Colonel Robertson directed the 1927 relief operations in the Marianna area from the towboat St. Augustine.
