= 1st Bombay Native Infantry =

1st Bombay Native Infantry may refer to:

- 102nd Prince of Wales's Own Grenadiers which was the 1st Battalion 1st Bombay Native Infantry
- 109th Infantry which was the 2nd Battalion 1st Bombay Native Infantry
