= 1st Canadian Infantry Battalion =

1st Canadian Infantry Battalion may refer to:

Unit of the First World War:

- 1st Battalion, CEF

Units of the Canadian Army Pacific Force in 1945:

- 1st Canadian Infantry Battalion (The Royal Canadian Regiment), 1st Canadian Infantry Regiment
- 1st Canadian Infantry Battalion (Princess Patricia's Canadian Light Infantry), 2nd Canadian Infantry Regiment
- 1st Canadian Infantry Battalion (Royal 22^{e} Régiment), 3rd Canadian Infantry Regiment

Unit of the Korean War:

- 1st Canadian Infantry Battalion, created in 1951 and in 1953 became 3rd Battalion, The Canadian Guards
