= Karl Marx City =

- Film poster
- Directed by: Michael Tucker; Petra Epperlein
- Written by: Michael Tucker; Petra Epperlein
- Produced by: Michael Tucker; Petra Epperlein
- Starring: Petra Epperlein; Christa Epperlein
- Narrated by: Petra Epperlein
- Cinematography: Michael Tucker
- Music by: Alexander Kliment
- Distributed by: Bond/360
- Release date: 16 March 2017
- Running time: 89 minutes
- Country: Germany
- Languages: German; English
- Box office: $41,070

Karl Marx City is a 2017 German documentary film, written, produced and directed by Michael Tucker and Petra Epperlein. The film was premiered at the 2016 Toronto International Film Festival.

== Synopsis ==
After her father commits suicide in 1999, filmmaker Petra Epperlein journeys through the former East Germany in search of answers.

== Cast ==
- Christa Epperlein
- Douglas Selvage
- Hubertus Knabe
- Petra Epperlein
- Udo Grashoff
- Uwe Epperlein
- Volker Epperlein

== Reception ==
On review aggregator website Rotten Tomatoes the film has an approval rating of 96% based on 26 critics, with an average rating of 8/10. On Metacritic, Karl Marx City has an above average score of 73 out of a 100 based on 10 critics, indicating "generally favorable reviews".

A.O. Scott of The New York Times called the documentary "unsettling" and added that "[it] is a smart, highly personal addition to the growing syllabus of distressingly relevant cautionary political tales".

Scott Tobias of Variety has compared the film's atmosphere to the one of today.

Stephen Dalton of The Hollywood Reporter, following the film's screening at Toronto International Film Festival, wrote: "a key joy of Karl Marx City is its strong, arty aesthetic".

Slant Magazine's Jake Cole said that the lead heroine (Petra Epperlein), "[who have] personal ties to the subject matter[,] provides the documentary with a necessary anchor point".

Ella Taylor of NPR wrote that "[the film] suffers now and then from the same breathy tendency to overdramatize already incendiary material that marred Epperlein and Tucker's 2005 Iraq doc[umentary] Gunner Palace.
