= The Prisoner or: How I Planned to Kill Tony Blair =

- Directed by: Michael Tucker; Petra Epperlein
- Written by: Michael Tucker; Petra Epperlein
- Produced by: Petra Epperlein
- Distributed by: Truly Indie
- Release dates: September 8, 2006 (Toronto International Film Festival); March 23, 2007 (United States)
- Running time: 72 minutes
- Language: English

The Prisoner or: How I Planned to Kill Tony Blair is a 2006 documentary film by American documentary filmmaker Michael Tucker.

The film depicts Yunis Khatayer Abbas, an Iraqi journalist who was detained by US troops in 2003 and later imprisoned at Abu Ghraib prison for nine months. Although innocent, he was accused by American military officials of plotting to assassinate then British Prime Minister Tony Blair, along with his two brothers.

== Production notes ==
Director Tucker was shooting his film, Gunner Palace, when he first encountered Abbas.

Abbas and his brothers were suspected of being a bomb-making cell planning to kill British prime minister Tony Blair during a planned visit to Iraq. In September 2003, 2/3 Field Artillery raided his home and Abbas and his brothers were detained while Tucker filmed Abbas proclaiming his innocence.

== See also ==
- Abu Ghraib Prison
- Human rights in post-Saddam Iraq
- Iraq War
- Human rights violations in Iraq
