= Fightville =

Mixed martial arts documentary

- Directed by: Michael Tucker, Petra Epperlein
- Produced by: Michael W. Gray
- Starring: Dustin Poirier; Tim Credeur; Albert Stainback; Gil Guillory
- Cinematography: Michael Tucker
- Edited by: Petra Epperlein, Michael Tucker
- Distributed by: Showtime Networks
- Release dates: March 12, 2011 (South by Southwest Film Festival); April 28, 2011
- Country: United States
- Language: English

Fightville is a mixed martial arts documentary film released in 2011. It was co-directed by Petra Epperlein and Michael Tucker.

The film features interviews with a group of Lafayette, Louisiana fighters and coaches, which includes Dustin Poirier, Tim Credeur, and Albert Stainback. Other fighters featured are Derrick Krantz and Ronny Lis. Poirier and Stainback receive much of the screen time as the filmmakers explore their troubled respective backgrounds and reasons for fighting. Credeur, a fighter and coach, is interviewed about his Gladiator Academy which seeks to "build better men". Gil "The Thrill" Guillory, the promoter of a local promotion named USA MMA, is also featured.

It premiered internationally on April 28, 2011, at the Hot Docs Canadian International Documentary Festival.

The idea for Fightville came about during production of Gunner Palace, when the filmmakers found out about MMA by observing soldiers watching and practicing the sport.
