= Christeene Vale =

American rapper

Christeene
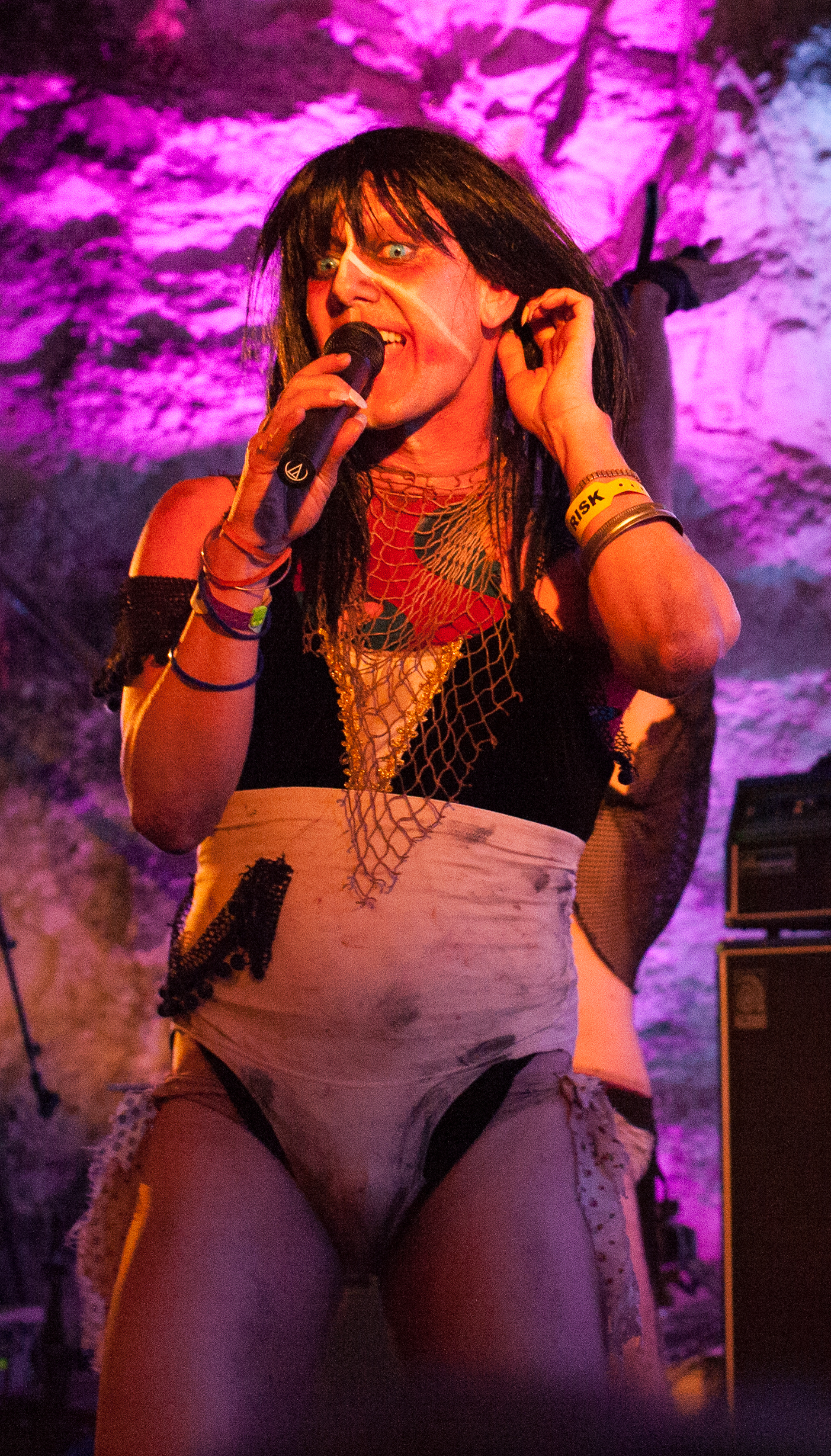
- Christeene performing at SXSW, 2014.
- Born: Paul Soileau; Lake Charles, Louisiana
- Other name: Christeene
- Occupations: Drag performer; singer-songwriter; rapper
- Website: ChristeeneMusic.com

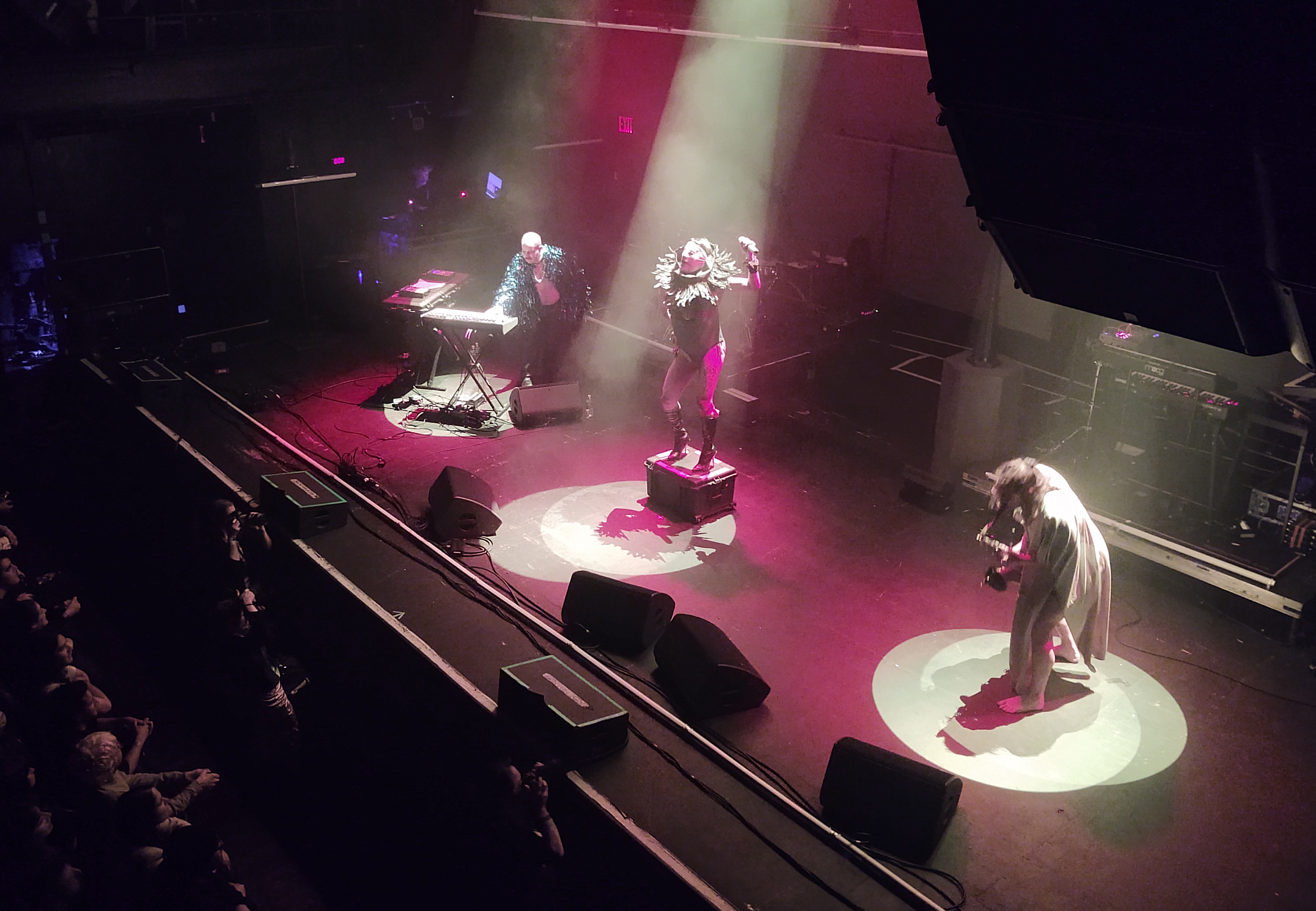
Christeene performing at Terminal 5 in Manhattan in 2023

Christeene is the stage name of Paul Soileau, an American drag queen, performance artist, singer-songwriter and rapper. Christeene is noted for untraditional, "terrorist drag," which features her wearing torn-up clothing, stringy matted black wigs, and heavy and smeared makeup with aims to expose hypocrisy and intolerance.

== Early life ==
Christeene is a character created and performed by Paul Soileau. Paul grew up in Lake Charles, Louisiana. He attended Loyola University New Orleans. Following college, he lived in New York City and New Orleans. After Hurricane Katrina, Soileau moved to Austin, Texas.

== Career ==
Christeene is Soileau's second drag character, his first being Rebecca Havemeyer, who is similar to Barry Humphries' Dame Edna. "When Christeene came out of me," said Soileau, "I was searching for something that had the action of a switchblade in my pocket -- a character I could really put on quickly, but affect people in a much stronger way. Something strong enough to channel things inside of me that needed to come out -- more aggressive things. When everything aligned properly, Christine [sic] kind of just appeared. I found the wig and went to town... Both characters speak honestly from within me, but Christeene addresses issues that Rebecca does not. There's a lot of political and social commentary going on. It allows me to try to process and understand me, Paul -- as a queer, a Southern boy. Someone understanding my environment and my own social realms. I can push it out through this Christeene character."

Christeene's first public appearance was at Camp Camp, a queer open-mic show in Austin, Texas. In 2011, Christeene was a resident at the CentralTrak Artist Residency in Dallas, TX.

Christeene contributed to the 2012 art magazine Satanica, which was printed in a limited edition of 350 copies. Other contributors included Bruce La Bruce and Michael Alig.

Soileau served as understudy for the role of Dr. Frank-N-Furter in the 2026 Broadway revival of The Rocky Horror Show. He took over the lead for two weeks between the departure of Luke Evans from the cast and the debut of permanent replacement Jake Shears. His stint in the role coincided with the death of Tim Curry, who had originated the role in its original 1973 production and the 1975 film adaptation, with Soileau leading a special performance of "I'm Going Home" in Curry's memory following the August 26 show.

== Music ==
Christeene's music videos are made by filmmaker PJ Raval. The final budget for each music video is around $200. For Christeene's first music video, "Fix My Dick", Raval borrowed a camera and they spent "about $20 on baby props from a thrift store." They finished the video in one day. The music video for "African Mayonnaise" was nominated for a SXSW Competition Award in 2012. Paul Soileau was an artist-in-residence in 2012 at CentralTrak.

He and PJ Raval developed new work for an experimental collaborative project entitled, "The O.T. (Old Testament)", giving Christeene a brief and much needed vacation.

== Artistry ==
Christeene describes themselves as a genderqueer "drag terrorist," and is influenced by Jayne County and Bruce LaBruce's use of non-heteronormative gender roles and sexuality. Chelsea Weathers of Art Lies compared Christeene's "drag terrorism," sexual and racial commentary to Vaginal Davis: "the reflection Christeene offers includes the necessarily unsanitized underbelly of queer experience—the ambiguity of identifying as queer and the anger and humor that is part and parcel of that experience."

== Discography ==
=== Albums ===
- Waste Up, Kneez Down (2012)
- Basura (2018)
- Midnite Fukk Train (2022)

=== Music videos ===
Song	Year	Director	Notes
"Fix My Dick"	2010	PJ Raval	
"Slowly/Easy"	2010	PJ Raval	
"Bustin' Brown"	2011	PJ Raval	
"Tears from My Pussy"	2011	PJ Raval	
"African Mayonnaise"	2012	PJ Raval	
"Workin' on Grandma"	2012	PJ Raval	
"Big Shot"	2013	PJ Raval	
"FUK V29"	2015	PJ Raval	
"Butt Muscle"	2017	Matt Lambert	
"Aktion Toilet"	2017	PJ Raval	
"T.S.S.P."	2018	PJ Raval	

== Filmography ==
Year	Title	Role	Notes
1998	Out of Sight	Lulu	
2010	Fourplay: San Francisco	Aliya	
2011	Fightville	Himself	
2011	Fourplay: Tampa	Himself	
2011	Slacker	Ranter on Bike	
2012	Fourplay	Aliya	
2012	The Reverie & Randee Show	Reverie	Won – aGLIFF Award at Austin Gay & Lesbian International Film Festival as writer
2013	The Bounceback	Emcee	
