= Visoko Sport Airfield =

- IATA: none; ICAO: LQVI

Summary
- Airport type: Public
- Serves: Visoko
- Location: Bosnia and Herzegovina
- Elevation AMSL: 1,470 ft / 448 m
- Coordinates: 44°1′30.2″N 018°5′50.1″E

Map
- Location of Visoko Sport Airfield in Bosnia and Herzegovina

Runways
Direction	Length		Surface
Direction	ft	m	Surface
08/26	2,340	713	Grass
- Source: Landings.com

Visoko Sport Airfield (ICAO: LQVI) is a public use airport located near Visoko, Bosnia and Herzegovina.

== See also ==
- List of airports in Bosnia and Herzegovina
