= Prijedor Urije Airfield =

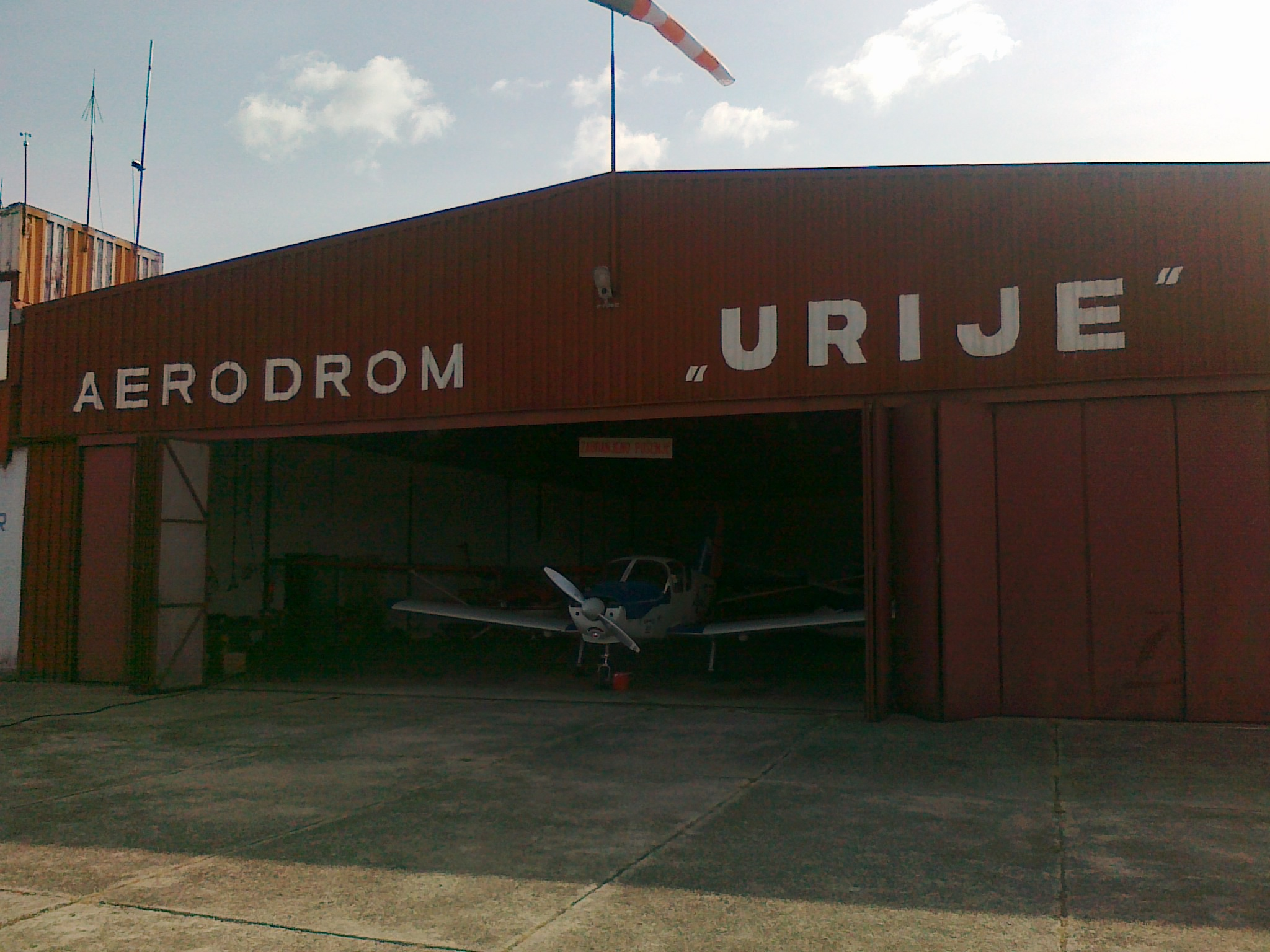
- IATA: none; ICAO: LQPD

Summary
- Airport type: Public
- Serves: Prijedor
- Location: Bosnia and Herzegovina
- Elevation AMSL: 591 ft / 180 m
- Coordinates: 44°59′37.7″N 16°44′11.8″E

Map
- Location of LQPD in Bosnia and Herzegovina

Runways
Direction	Length		Surface
Direction	ft	m	Surface
09/27	2,970	1,905	Grass
09/27	2,297	700	Concrete

Prijedor Urije Airfield (ICAO: LQPD) (Serbian: Аеродром Урије Приједор, romanized: Aerodrom Urije Prijedor) is a public use recreational aerodrome located near Prijedor, Bosnia and Herzegovina.

== See also ==
- List of airports in Bosnia and Herzegovina
