= List of airports in Bosnia and Herzegovina =

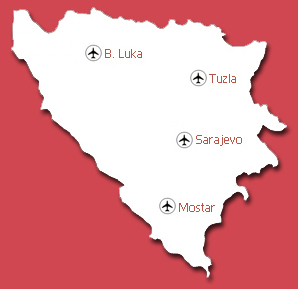
Airports of Bosnia and Herzegovina

This is a list of airports and airfields in Bosnia and Herzegovina.

Bosnia and Herzegovina has:

- 4 International airports (one main airport; Sarajevo International Airport)
- 2 International airport under construction (Bihać Golubić Airport and Trebinje International Airport)
- 20 airfields of which 14 have grass runways and 6 have asphalt runways

== Statistics ==
=== Passenger statistics ===
Statistics data for all International airports in Bosnia and Herzegovina. Source: Bosnia and Herzegovina Directorate of Civil Aviation

Rank	Airport	2026 (JAN-OCT)	2027	2028	2029	2030
1)	Sarajevo International Airport	1.963.069	-	-	-	-
2)	Tuzla International Airport	564.577	-	-	-	-
3)	Banja Luka International Airport	359.242	-	-	-	-
4)	Mostar International Airport	59.140	-	-	-	-
Total	Bosnia and Herzegovina	2.946.028	-	-	-	-
Percent change		+%	-	-	-	-

Source: Bosnia and Herzegovina Directorate of Civil Aviation

Rank	Airport	2025	2024	2023	2022	2021	2020	2019	2018	2017	2016	2015
1)	Sarajevo International Airport	2,226,692	1,821,762	1,362,007	1,377,348	767,133	249.642	1.143.680	1.046.635	957.971	838,968	772,904
2)	Tuzla International Airport	338,130	207,551	582,336	474.336	299.012	228.425	593.083	584.589	535.834	311,398	259,074
3)	Banja Luka International Airport	484,711	399,173	460.719	343.009	139.885	43.775	149.693	36.180	20.867	21,694	22,800
4)	Mostar International Airport	72,367	47,544	20.544	10.727	1.942	1.374	32.866	28.463	43.118	53,618	75,024
Total	Bosnia and Herzegovina	3,121,858	2,476,030	2,425,606	2,205,521	1.207.971	523.413	1.919.342	1.695.842	1.557.790	1.225.678	1.129.802
Percent change		+26.07%	+2.07%	+9.97%	+82.58%	+130.78%	-72.72%	+13.17%	+8.8%	+27.09%	+8.48%	

== Market Share ==
=== Bosnia and Herzegovina Airport's Market share ===
2025	2018	2017	2016	2015
Bosnia and Herzegovina airports market share in 2025	Bosnia and Herzegovina airports market share in 2018	Bosnia and Herzegovina airports market share in 2017	Bosnia and Herzegovina airports market share in 2016	Bosnia and Herzegovina airports market share in 2015

== Airports and Airfields ==
=== Airports and Airfields ===
Airport names shown in bold indicate the airport has scheduled service on commercial airlines.

Location	Runway	ICAO	IATA	Airport name	Type
Banja Luka	Asphalt	LQBK	BNX	**Banja Luka International Airport**	Public
Banja Luka / Zalužani	Grass	LQBZ		Banja Luka Zalužani Airfield	Public
Bijeljina	Grass	LQBN		Bijeljina Airport	
Brčko	Grass	LQMG		Camp McGovern	Public
Bihać	Grass	LQBI		Bihać Golubić Airport	Public
Ćoralići	Asphalt	LQCO		~~Ćoralići Airfield~~	(Closed)
Bihać	Asphalt	LYBI		Željava Air Base	Military
Doboj	Grass	LQDO		Doboj Airport	
Glamoč	Grass	LQGL		Glamoč road runway	Public
Kupres	Asphalt	LQKU		Kupres Bajramovići Airport	Public
Livno	Asphalt	LQLV		Livno Brda Bosni Airport	Public
Modriča	Grass	LQMD		Modriča Airport	
Mostar	Asphalt	LQMO	OMO	**Mostar International Airport**	Public
Mostar / Jasenica	~~Asphalt~~	LQMJ		~~Mostar Jasenica Airport~~	(Closed)
Novi Travnik	Grass	LQTR		Novi Travnik Airport	
Prijedor	Asphalt	LQPD		Prijedor Urije Airport	Public
Sarajevo	Asphalt	LQSA	SJJ	**Sarajevo International Airport**	Public
Sarajevo / Butmir	Asphalt	LQBU		Sarajevo Butmir Airport	Public
Sarajevo	Asphalt	LQSV		Sarajevo Military Airport	Military
Tomislavgrad	Grass	LQTG		Tomislavgrad Airport	Public
Trebinje	Grass	LQTB		Trebinje Airport	
Tuzla	Asphalt	LQTZ	TZL	**Tuzla International Airport**	Public
Tuzla	Grass	LQJL		Tuzla Jegen Lug Airport	Public
Tuzla	Asphalt			Tuzla Air Base	Military
Visoko	Grass	LQVI		Visoko Sport Airfield	Public
Živinice	Asphalt	LQCG		Sport Airfield Ciljuge	Public

== See also ==
- Transport in Bosnia and Herzegovina
- Bosnia and Herzegovina Air Force
- List of airports by ICAO code: L#LQ – Bosnia and Herzegovina
- Wikipedia:WikiProject Aviation/Airline destination lists: Europe#Bosnia and Herzegovina
