= Tuzla Jegen Lug Airport =

Tuzla Jegin Lug Airport Aerodrom Jegin Lug Tuzla
- IATA: none; ICAO: LQJL

Summary
- Airport type: Public
- Serves: Tuzla
- Location: Bosnia and Herzegovina
- Elevation AMSL: 869 ft / 265 m
- Coordinates: 44°27′27.7″N 18°48′29.8″E

Map
- Location of Tuzla Jegin Lug Airport in Bosnia and Herzegovina

Runways
Direction	Length		Surface
Direction	ft	m	Surface
04/22	3,650	1,113	Grass
- Source: Landings.com

Tuzla Jegin Lug Airport (ICAO: LQJL) is a public use airport located near Tuzla, Bosnia and Herzegovina. Tuzla Jegin Lug Airport is situated in Donji Rainci, about 7 miles far away from Tuzla Town in SE direction (heading 110 degrees). The function of the airport is currently sport flying, recreation and tourism, with BHDCA registered flight training school. Owner and operator of Tuzla Jegin Lug Airport (LQJL) is Aero club Tuzla (BHDCA Certificate no. Е-7-L-004).

In 2017, the airfield underwent major renovation and modernization and is now able to host more recreational events.

== See also ==
- List of airports in Bosnia and Herzegovina
