= 39th Mobile Brigade Combat Team =

39th Mobile Brigade Combat Team (The Arkansas Brigade)
- 39th MBCT Shoulder Sleeve Insignia
- Active: 1 December 1967–1 September 2005 (39th Infantry Bge.); 1 September 2005–present (39th MBCT)
- Country: United States of America
- Branch: Army National Guard
- Type: Infantry
- Role: Brigade Combat Team
- Part of: 35th Infantry Division (United States)
- Headquarters: Camp Robinson Maneuver Training Center, Arkansas
- Nickname: "The Arkansas Brigade"
- Motto: Courage
- Anniversaries: Organization Day (25 August)
- Campaigns: World War I; Iraq War (U.S. phase, 2003-2010)
- Decorations: Meritorious Unit Commendation

Commanders
- Current commander: Col. Matt Bially

Insignia
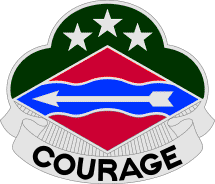
- Distinctive insignia

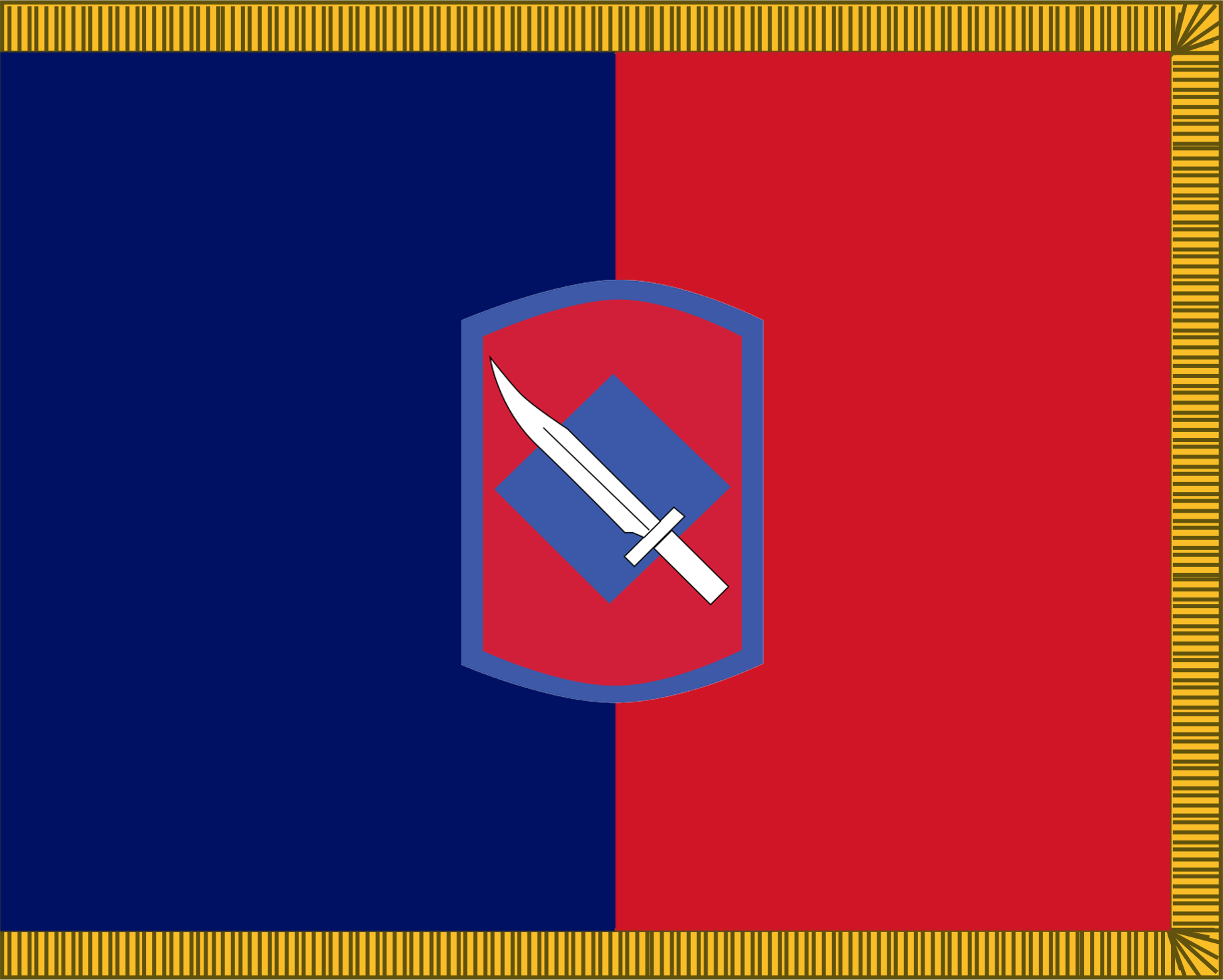
- 39th Infantry Brigade Flag

The 39th Mobile Brigade Combat Team (39th MBCT), also officially known as The Arkansas Brigade, is an infantry brigade combat team of the Army National Guard composed of personnel from the U.S. states of Arkansas, Missouri, and Nebraska. The unit is the largest Army National Guard command in Arkansas and is headquartered at the Camp Robinson Maneuver Training Center. It was ordered into federal service in 2003 to fight in the Iraq War. The 39th was attached to the 1st Cavalry Division and served in and around Baghdad for a year, as part of the OIF II rotation, returning to the United States in March 2005.

In late August 2005, after Hurricane Katrina hit the Gulf Coast of the United States, elements of the 39th Infantry Brigade Combat Team were among the first military units to provide recovery and relief efforts to citizens of New Orleans, Louisiana. The brigade combat team led the effort to evacuate an estimated 16,000 people from the New Orleans Convention Center. The 39th Infantry Brigade Combat Team completed its second deployment to Iraq in 2008, after spending a year on active federal duty. Unlike the first deployment, the brigade combat team did not have command and control of all its subordinate units. In 2026 the brigade was reorganized as 39th Mobile Brigade Combat Team.

== History ==
=== 20th century ===
==== World War I ====
The unit was organized for service in World War I on 25 August 1917 at Camp Beauregard, Louisiana as the 39th Division (Delta Division) from National Guard troops of Louisiana, Mississippi, and Arkansas. It arrived in France during August and September 1918. Upon arrival the division was sent to the St. Florent area south-west of Bourges where it was designated as a replacement division. On 2 November it moved to St. Aignan and the personnel of most of the units was withdrawn and sent to other organizations leaving the 39th Division skeletonized. With one exception the units of the division did not participate in combat operations, although a large number of the personnel was transferred to combat divisions, and took part in operations. The 114th Engineers participated as a unit in the Meuse-Argonne Offensive from 3 October – 11 November 1918. The 39th Division permanent cadre returned to the United States in December 1918. It demobilized the following month at Camp Beauregard. In 1923, when the 39th Division was redesignated the 31st Division (Dixie Division), its Arkansas units were transferred from the division and continued to operate as non-divisional units. For a history of those units, see articles on the 153rd Infantry and the 206th Coast Artillery.

==== Cold War ====
On 26 August 1947, the unit was reorganized and federally recognized in part at Little Rock as the 39th Infantry Division. During this period the division included the 153d Infantry Regiment, the 156th Infantry Regiment, and the 206th Field Artillery Regiment. On 2 November 1967, the division was reorganized again and subsequently redesignated the 39th Infantry Brigade. This change resulted in a massive restationing within the state as follows:

New unit	Former unit	Station
Headquarters and Headquarters Company, 39th Infantry Brigade	Headquarters and Headquarters Company, 39th Infantry Division	Little Rock
Troop E, 151st Cavalry Regiment	Company C, 2d Battalion, 153d Infantry Regiment	Conway
239th Engineer Company	Company A, 217th Engineer Battalion	Clarksville
Detachment 1, 239th Engineer Company	Company E, 217th Engineer Battalion	Russellville
39th Aviation Company	Company A, 39th Aviation Battalion, and Headquarters and Company A, 739th Maintenance Battalion	North Little Rock
Headquarters and Headquarters Detachment, 39th Support Battalion	Headquarters and Headquarters Battery, 2d Battalion, 206th Field Artillery Regiment	Hazen
Company A, 39th Support Battalion	39th Admin Company and Headquarters and Headquarters Company, 39th Infantry Division Support Command	Little Rock
Company C, 39th Support Battalion	Company B, 125th Medical Batatlion	Lonoke
Detachment 1, Company B, 39th Support Battalion	Company C, 125th Medical Battalion	DeWitt
Company C, 39th Support Battalion	222d Engineer Company	Stuttgart
Detachment 1, Company C, 39th Support Battalion	New unit	Hazen
Company D, 39th Support Battalion	176th Ordnance Company	Little Rock
Detachment 1, Company D, 39th Support Battalion	Detachment 1, Headquarters and Company A, 739th Ordnance Battalion	Perryville
Headquarters and Headquarters Service Battery, 5th Battalion, 206th Field Artillery Regiment	Headquarters and Headquarters Battery, 5th Battalion, 142d Artillery and Service Battery, 5th Battalion, 142d Artillery	West Memphis
Detachment 1, Headquarters and Headquarters Service Battery, 5th Battalion, 206th Field Artillery Regiment	Headquarters and Headquarters Battery, 3d Battalion, 206th Field Artillery Regiment	Marianna
Battery A, 5th Battalion, 206th Field Artillery Regiment	Battery A, 5th Battalion, 142d Artillery	Wynne
Battery B, 5th Battalion, 206th Field Artillery Regiment	Battery B, 5th Battalion, 142d Artillery	Forrest City
Battery C, 5th Battalion, 206th Field Artillery Regiment	Battery C, 5th Battalion, 142d Artillery	Harrisburg
Headquarters and Headquarters Company, 1st Battalion, 153d Infantry Regiment	Malvern	
Detachment 1, Headquarters and Headquarters Company, 1st Battalion, 153d Infantry Regiment	Detachment 1, Headquarters and Headquarters Company, 2d Battalion, 206th Armor	Sheridan
Detachment 2, Headquarters and Headquarters Company, 1st Battalion, 153d Infantry Regiment	Headquarters and Headquarters Company, 2d Battalion, 206th Armor	Pine Bluff
Company A, 1st Battalion, 153d Infantry Regiment	Company C, 1st Battalion, 153d Infantry Regiment	Prescot
Detachment 1, Company A, 1st Battalion, 153d Infantry Regiment	Company A, 1st Battalion, 153d Infantry Regiment	Arkadelphia
Company B, 1st Battalion, 153d Infantry Regiment	Company B, 1st Battalion, 153d Infantry Regiment	Texarkana
Detachment 1, Company B, 1st Battalion, 153d Infantry Regiment	Detachment 1, Company B, 1st Battalion, 153d Infantry Regiment	Hope
Company C, 1st Battalion, 153rd Infantry	Detachment 1, Headquarters and Headquarters Company, 1st Battalion, 153d Infantry Regiment	Mena
Detachment 1, Company C, 1st Battalion, 153d Infantry Regiment	1121st Transportation Company	Dequeen
Headquarters and Headquarters Company, 2d Battalion, 153d Infantry Regiment	Searcy	
Detachment 1, Headquarters and Headquarters Company, 2d Battalion, 153d Infantry Regiment	Newport	
Detachment 2, Headquarters and Headquarters Company, 2d Battalion, 153d Infantry Regiment	Headquarters and Headquarters Company, 3d Brigade, 39th Infantry Division	Beebe
Company A, 2d Battalion, 153d Infantry Regiment	Walnut Ridge	
Detachment 1, Company A, 2d Battalion, 153d Infantry Regiment	Battery C, 4th Battalion, 142d Artillery	Piggott
Company B, 2d Battalion, 153d Infantry Regiment	Batesville	
Detachment 1, Company B, 2d Battalion, 153d Infantry Regiment	Battery A, 2d Battalion, 206th Field Artillery Regiment	Augusta
Company C, 2d Battalion, 153d Infantry Regiment	Battery B, 2d Battalion, 206th Field Artillery Regiment	Brinkley
Detachment 1, Company C, 2d Battalion, 153d Infantry Regiment	Battery A, 3d Battalion, 206th Field Artillery Regiment	Helena
Detachment 2, Company C, 2d Battalion, 153d Infantry Regiment	Battery C, 2d Battalion, 206th Field Artillery Regiment	West Helena
Headquarters and Headquarters Company, 3d Battalion, 153d Infantry	Headquarters and Headquarters Company, 1st Battalion, 206th Armor	Warren
Detachment 1, Headquarters and Headquarters Company, 3d Battalion, 153d Infantry	Detachment 1, Headquarters and Headquarters Company, 1st Battalion, 206th Armor	Magnolia
Detachment 2, Headquarters and Headquarters Company, 3d Battalion, 153d Infantry	295th Medical Company	Dermontt
Company A, 3d Battalion, 153d Infantry	Company A, 1st Battalion, 206th Armor	El Dorado
Detachment 1, Company A, 3d Battalion, 153d Infantry	Company C, 1st Battalion, 206th Armor	Crossett
Company B, 3d Battalion, 153d Infantry	Company C, 2d Battalion, 206th Armor	Fordyce
Detachment 1, Company B, 3d Battalion, 153d Infantry	Company B, 1st Battalion, 206th Armor	Camden
Company C, 3d Battalion, 153d Infantry	Company A, 2d Battalion, 206th Armor	McGehee
Detachment 1, Company C, 3d Battalion, 153d Infantry	Company B, 2d Battalion, 206th Armor	Dumas

In 1967 the division was redesignated as the 39th Infantry Brigade (Separate) and in 1973 was paired with the US 101st Airborne Division as a training partner and became an air-assault brigade. The following Regiments were represented in the 39th Infantry Brigade (Separate): 153d Infantry Regiment, 151st Cavalry Regiment and the 206th Field Artillery Regiment. 39th Brigade units conducted numerous overseas training rotations throughout the 1980s and early 1990s.

==== 1990s ====
In 1994 the brigade was again reorganized and gained its designation as an "enhanced" brigade. In 1999, the 39th became part of the 7th Infantry Division under the Army Integrated Division concept which paired National Guard and Reserve brigades with active duty headquarters and support units.

Company B, 2d Battalion, 153d Infantry Regiment, and Company B, 3d Battalion, 153d Infantry Regiment of the 39th Infantry Brigade Combat Team were activated for Operation Southern Watch, May through September 1999. Company B, 2d Battalion, 153d Infantry Regiment deployed to Kuwait while Company B, 3d Battalion, 153d Infantry Regiment deployed to Prince Sultan Air Base, Saudi Arabia. Soldiers provided security at Patriot missile batteries during these deployments. The mission lasted a total of seven months, and was the first "pure" National Guard effort in the region. Company C, 1st Battalion, 153d Infantry carried on the 39th's role in Operation Southern Watch when they replaced Company B, 2d Battalion, 153d Infantry Regiment in September 1999.

Company B, 3d Battalion, 153d Infantry Regiment was the first National Guard unit since the Vietnam War to be involuntarily mobilized by presidential order (President Bill Clinton). The unit was mobilized to support operations in Operation Southern Watch. The battalion commander was Lieutenant Colonel Ewing, company commander was Captain Rozenberg and the company first sergeant was First Sergeant Nutt. B Company consisted of over 120 soldiers from the Camden and Fordyce units and volunteers from other areas of south and central Arkansas. The unit primarily provided security for two active duty Army Patriot missile batteries in Saudi Arabia. The units conducted initial training for the deployment in Camp Joseph T. Robinson, Arkansas and Fort Carson, Colorado. The success of the mission laid the ground work for additional deployments of National Guard units.

=== 21st century ===
In March 2001, Company D, 1st Battalion, 153d Infantry Regiment and Company D, 3d Battalion, 153d Infantry Regiment deployed to Bosnia as part of the Multinational Stabilization Force (SFOR), Security Force Nine in order to assist with the enforcement of the mandate of the United Nations Mission in Bosnia and Herzegovina (UNMIBH). The companies were attached to 3d Squadron, 7th Cavalry Regiment, 3d Infantry Division for the deployment as part of Task Force Eagle. They performed presence patrols outside Forward Operating Base Morgan and Camp McGovern, and participated in the consolidation of weapon storage sites. The soldiers also guarded the sites.

On 8 October 2001, 2d Battalion, 153d Infantry Regiment was activated. Second Battalion was sent to Egypt in order to take over the Multinational Force and Observers mission, freeing up regular army infantry units to deploy to Afghanistan. The 2d Battalion, 153d Infantry Regiment mission during the MFO was: "...to supervise the implementation of the security provisions of the Egyptian-Israeli Treaty of Peace and employ best efforts to prevent any violation of its terms." This mission was accomplished by carrying out four tasks: operating checkpoints, observation posts and conducting reconnaissance patrols on the international border as well as within Zone C; verification of the terms of the peace treaty not less than twice a month; verification of the terms of the peace treaty within 48 hours, upon the request of either party, and ensuring freedom of international marine navigation in the Strait of Tiran and access to the Gulf of Aqaba. This was the first "pure" National Guard takeover of the MFO mission. 2d Battalion, 153d Infantry Regiment deactivated on 11 October 2002.

==== Iraq 2003-2005 ====
The brigade was notified in 2002 that it would be participating in a rotation to the Joint Readiness Training Center at Fort Polk, Louisiana. For National Guard brigades, a rotation is a three-year process that provides additional money, resources and training opportunities in order to improve unit readiness before the actual rotation through the Joint Readiness Training Center. The brigade was required to complete a mission rehearsal exercise during the 2003 annual training which was conducted at Fort Chaffee, Arkansas. Less than a month after the completion of this major training milestone, the brigade received its alert for deployment to Iraq in support of Operation Iraqi Freedom on 28 July 2003.

On 12 October 2003, the brigade, commanded by Brigadier General Ronald Chastain, was ordered to federal service to fight in the Iraq War for a period of up to 18 months. The brigade conducted post mobilization training at Fort Hood, Texas from October 2003 until January 2004. In January the brigade shipped its vehicles and equipment to Iraq from Fort Hood, and then moved to Fort Polk for a Mission Rehearsal Exercise at the Joint Readiness Training Center. On 17 February 2004, President George W. Bush visited the brigade and had an MRE (Meal, Ready-to-Eat) lunch in a field mess tent with soldiers. After lunch, President Bush made brief remarks to the soldiers.

When the brigade combat team received its alert, it was approximately 700 soldiers short of its authorized end strength. This shortage was due in large part to the way new recruits are accounted for in the National Guard. In the active Army a new recruit only comes to a unit and is counted on its books after the soldier has completed Basic Combat Training and Advanced Individual Training. In the National Guard, the new recruit is counted on the unit's strength reports as soon as the Soldier signs their contract. The brigade combat team had over 500 soldiers who had not completed either Basic or Advanced Individual Training upon alert.

This shortage led to the decision to consolidate the available manning into two infantry battalions that would be supplied for the brigade by the Arkansas National Guard and to ask the National Guard Bureau to provide the third infantry battalion. Because of the 2002 deployment of the 2d Battalion, 153d Infantry Regiment to the MFO, the battalion was deemed non-deployable as an organization; however, the soldiers of the battalion were to deploy. The decision was made by BG Chastain to transfer the battalion commander and staff from 2d Battalion, 153d Infantry Regiment to 3d Battalion, 153d Infantry Regiment. The 3d Battalion, 153d Infantry Regiment commander and staff were transferred to 2d Battalion, 153d Infantry Regiment and were designated to function as the brigade's rear detachment during Operation Iraqi Freedom. This transfer led to the 3d Battalion, 153d Infantry Regiment often being referred to as the two-thirds (2/3) battalion by personnel of the brigade. 3d Battalion, 153d Infantry Regiment adopted the 2d Battalion, 153d Infantry Regiment nickname and call sign, "Gunslingers" for Operation Iraqi Freedom.

The National Guard Bureau met the brigade's need for additional soldiers by alerting 2d Battalion, 162d Infantry Regiment, from the Oregon National Guard; a platoon of Company B, 1st Battalion, 108th Infantry Regiment, New York National Guard; a platoon of Company C, 1st Battalion, 102d Infantry Regiment from the Connecticut National Guard; the 1115th Transportation Company and elements of the 642d Maintenance Company from the New Mexico Army National Guard; elements of 629th Military Intelligence Battalion from the Maryland National Guard; elements of HHSC, 233d Military Intelligence Company, California National Guard; and, Battery A, 1st Battalion, 103d Field Artillery, Rhode Island National Guard to round out the brigade and bring it to its full deployment strength of 3700 soldiers. With the addition of Company A, 28th Signal Battalion, from the Pennsylvania National Guard, the brigade included National Guard soldiers from ten states.

The brigade's mission during Operation Iraqi Freedom was to conduct stability and support operations and to secure key terrain in and around Baghdad, supported by focused and fully integrated information (IO) and civil-military operations, in order to enable the progressive transfer of authority to the Iraqi people, their institutions and a legitimate Iraqi national government. The lines of operation as established by 1st Cavalry Division included: combat operations; train and equip security forces; essential services; promote governance; and, economic pluralism, with information operations interconnected throughout. The end state envisioned by Maj. Gen. Peter W. Chiarelli of these full spectrum operations was a secure and stable environment for Iraqis, maintained by indigenous police and security forces under the direction of a legitimate, national government that is freely elected and accepts economic pluralism.

The 39th Infantry Brigade relieved the 1st Brigade, 1st Armored Division in the Baghdad neighborhoods of Adhamiyah and Rusafa as well as elements of 3rd Brigade, 1st Armored Division at Camp Taji. This relief in place took place in the midst of a multiparty insurgency uprising. The brigade's convoys were heavily opposed during the convoy north. The brigade was task organized with 1st Battalion, 153d Infantry Regiment being detached to 3d Brigade, 1st Cavalry Division, in exchange for the attachment of 2d Squadron, 7th Cavalry Regiment, of George Armstrong Custer and LZ Albany fame, to the brigade. The 1st Battalion, 153d Infantry Regiment was headquartered in the Green Zone in Baghdad with the 3d Brigade, 1st Cavalry Division. The 39th Infantry Brigade headquarters, 239 MI Company, 239 Engineer Company, 2d Squadron, 7th Cavalry Regiment and 1st Battalion, 206th Field Artillery Regiment were stationed at Camp Cooke in Taji, Iraq.

The 2d Squadron, 7th Cavalry Regiment controlled a massive area of operations that stretched from just north of the Baghdad City Gate, north along Iraqi Highway 1, (Main Supply Route Tampa) to the city of Mushada, bounded on the east by the Tigris River, and stretching west to the boundary with the 1st Marine Expeditionary Force, approximately 10 kilometres (6.2 mi) east of Fallujah. This Area of Operations was twice assumed by 1st Battalion, 206th Field Artillery Regiment when 2d Squadron, 7th Cavalry Regiment was detached from the brigade. 2d Squadron, 7th Cavalry Regiment was tasked with providing a Military Assistance Training Team to Company D, 307th Iraq National Guard Battalion, based in Mushada, Iraq.

The 1st Battalion, 206th Field Artillery Regiment provided fires in support of brigade combat operations from Camp Taji; functioned as the base defense operations center for Camp Taji, manned the main entry control point (ECP) for Camp Taji; provided convoy and VIP escorts; and, controlled a small area of operations south of Camp Taji between Iraqi Highway 1 and the Tigris River. On two occasions 1st Battalion, 206th Field Artillery Regiment became responsible for the entire area of operations assigned to the 2d Squadron, 7th Cavalry Regiment. The 1st Battalion, 206th Field Artillery Regiment Field Artillery also provided a military assistance training team to the Headquarters and Companies A, B, and C of the 307th Iraqi National Guard Battalion, which was also stationed at Camp Taji. The 307th was the only Iraqi army element stationed on the Coalition Forces side of Camp Taji.

The 3d Battalion, 153d Infantry Regiment was stationed at FOB Gunslinger (aka FOB Solidarity), in the Adhamiyah neighborhood of Baghdad which lies immediately to the west of Sadr City. Additionally the battalion was charged with patrolling a large area of operations that stretched north from Baghdad along the east side of the Tigris River, and included the city of Hussainiyah, a town of 500,000 about 12 miles north of Baghdad. the battalion was tasked with providing a military assistance training team to support the Headquarters and Companies C and D of the 301st Iraqi National Guard Battalion, and Company C, 102d Iraqi National Guard Battalion.

The 2d Battalion, 162d Infantry Regiment was stationed at FOB Volunteer in the Rusafa neighborhood of Baghdad which lies to the south of Sadr City. The battalion was tasked with supplying a military assistance training team to Companies A and B, of the 301st Iraqi National Guard Battalion.

In April 2004 the 39th came under rocket attack at Camp Cooke in Taji, resulting in four Arkansas soldiers killed in action, all members of the 39th Support Battalion, headquartered in Hazen. The 24 April attack resulted in the highest single day casualty total for Arkansas soldiers since the Korean War. Members of Company C, 1st Battalion, 153d Infantry Regiment spent weeks fighting as part of Task Force 1–9 CAV, 3rd Brigade, 1st Cavalry Division on the hotly contested area of Haifa Street in Baghdad.

The 2d Squadron, 7th Cavalry Regiment, including 1st Platoon, Company C, 3d Battalion, 153d Infantry Regiment was twice detached from the 39th Infantry Brigade to act as the corps reserve. In August 2004, the squadron was detached from Multi National Division-Baghdad to Multi National Division-South as part of the Battle of Najaf (2004). In November 2004, the squadron was attached to the 1st Marine Expeditionary Force to take part in the Second Battle of Fallujah.

The 3d Battalion, 153d Infantry Regiment provided security to two massive Shiite marches to the Khadamiyah Shrine which were staged through Sunni neighborhoods. They were accompanied by very little violence due to the battalion's work with Iraqi National Guard and Iraqi Police officials.

On 3 October 2004, Staff Sergeant Christopher Potts (Battery A, 1–103rd FA) and Sergeant Russell "Doc" Collier, from 1st Battalion, 206th Field Artillery were killed in a fire fight with insurgents near the village of Musurraf, south of Camp Taji along the Tigris River. Sergeant Collier was posthumously awarded the Silver Star for his actions when he moved forward under heavy enemy fire in order to render aid to Staff Sergeant Potts who had been shot while attempting to silence an enemy automatic weapon. Staff Sergeant Potts was posthumously awarded the Bronze Star Medal with V Device for his actions.

On 14 November 2004, a patrol of 307th Iraqi National Guard Soldiers with an adviser team from 1st Battalion, 206th Field Artillery led by Captain John Vanlandingham, and an escort platoon from B Company, 3d Battalion, 153d Infantry Regiment was ambushed north of Mushada, Iraq. Vanlandingham received the Silver Star medal for his actions to save several wounded Iraqi Army soldiers who had become separated from the patrol during the ambush. Vanlandingham repeatedly exposed himself to enemy fire in order to carry wounded Iraqi soldiers to safety.

The most coordinated enemy attack the brigade had seen occurred on 20 November 2004 when twenty-six soldiers of Company C, 3d Battalion, 153d Infantry Regiment Infantry were ambushed near Fort Apache in North Baghdad. They fended off over 100 insurgents for several hours without ammunition resupply or support. The platoon leader, First Lieutenant Michael McCarty, despite being wounded, endured intense enemy direct fire and personally neutralized an enemy machine gun emplacement without support. Lieutenant McCarty received the Silver Star for going above and beyond the call of duty.

The 1st Battalion, 153d Infantry Regiment conducted over 8,200 combat patrols, captured six division targets and contained or disrupted 15 vehicle borne improvised explosive device (VBIED) attacks in their sector. The battalion worked to suppress indirect fire attacks on the International Zone during the Transfer of Iraqi Sovereignty and weekly Iraqi National Congress meetings. Lieutenant Colonel Kendall Penn, battalion commander, also worked closely with the Karahda District Counsel to oversee over six million dollars of infrastructure and community improvement projects in the battalion's area of operations.

The 39th Infantry Brigade was instrumental in the January 2005 elections. The brigade was responsible for the establishment and security of 20 different polling sites within the brigade's area of operations. In order to avoid jeopardizing the credibility of the election process, it was necessary to avoid a Coalition Force presence at the polling sites. This meant that the security at the polling sites would be the responsibility of the New Iraqi Army units for which the 39th was responsible. 39th Brigade leaders spent countless hours planning and coordination with Iraqi counterpart units and governmental elections officials, and not one polling site in the 39th Infantry Brigade Combat Team area of operations was disrupted or forced to close.

The members of the 239th Engineer Company stationed in Camp Cooke and their families back in Arkansas were the subject of a TV documentary series that aired on the Discovery Times channel called Off To War. The 39th was also covered by embedded reporter Amy Schlesing of the Arkansas Democrat Gazette for the entire time in Iraq. The definitive work on the 39th Brigade's first deployment to Iraq was published by the Arkansas Democrat Gazette. The work entitled The Bowie Brigade, Arkansas National Guard's 39th Infantry Brigade in Iraq was published in 2005 and is a collection of the work of Ms. Schlesing and the embedded writers and photographers who accompanied the brigade: Statnon Breidenthal, Karen E. Segrave, Arron Skinner, Stephen B. Thorton and Michael Woods.

The 39th Infantry Brigade was relieved in place by the 3d Brigade, 1st Armored Division, on 12 March 2005, which was the same unit that the 1st Battalion, 206th Field Artillery Regiment had relieved at Camp Taji on 24 March 2004. During the deployment the 39th Infantry Brigade suffered a total of thirty six killed in action, including soldiers from attached units. Sixteen of those killed in action were members of the Arkansas National Guard. Members of the brigade were awarded three Silver Stars, dozens of Bronze Star Medals and Army Commendation Medals with V device and over 250 Purple Heart Medals. In the March 2005, units of the brigade started their rotation back to Fort Carson, Colorado, Fort Hood, Texas, and Fort Sill, Oklahoma for demobilization.

The following units were task organized under the 39th Infantry Brigade Team during Operation Iraqi Freedom II

Battalion	Company	Source
Headquarters and Headquarters Company, 39th Infantry Brigade Combat Team		Arkansas National Guard
*2d Squadron, 7th Cavalry Regiment	Headquarters and Headquarters Company, 2d Squadron, 7th Cavalry Regiment	Fort Hood, TX
	Troop A, 2d Squadron, 7th Cavalry Regiment	Fort Hood, TX
	Troop B, 2d Squadron, 7th Cavalry Regiment	Fort Hood, TX
	Troop C, 2d Squadron, 7th Cavalry Regiment	Fort Hood, TX
	1st Platoon, Company C, 3rd Battalion, 153d Infantry Regiment	Arkansas National Guard
	Troop C, 3rd Squadron, 8th Cavalry Regiment	Fort Hood, TX
	Company B, 2d Battalion, 162d Infantry Regiment	Oregon National Guard
	Battery F, 1st Battalion, 202rd Air Defense Artillery Regiment	Illinois National Guard
3rd Battalion, 153d Infantry Regiment	Headquarters and Headquarters Company, 3rd Battalion, 153d Infantry Regiment	Arkansas National Guard
	Company A, 3d Battalion, 153d Infantry Regiment	Arkansas National Guard
	Company C, 3d Battalion, 153d Infantry Regiment	Arkansas National Guard
	Company D, 3d Battalion, 153d Infantry Regiment	Arkansas National Guard
	Troop E, 151st Cavalry Regiment	Arkansas National Guard
	Elements of Company C, 1st Battalion, 102d Infantry Regiment	Connecticut National Guard
2d Battalion, 162d Infantry Regiment	Headquarters and Headquarters Company, 2d Battalion, 162d Infantry Regiment	Oregon National Guard
	Company A, 2d Battalion, 162d Infantry Regiment	Oregon National Guard
	Company C, 2d Battalion, 162d Infantry Regiment	Oregon National Guard
	Company D, 2d Battalion, 162d Infantry Regiment	Oregon National Guard
	Elements of Company B, 1st Battalion, 108th Infantry Regiment	New York National Guard
1st Battalion, 206th Field Artillery Regiment	HHSB, 1st Battalion, 206th Field Artillery Regiment	Arkansas National Guard
	Battery A, 1st Battalion, 206th Field Artillery Regiment	Arkansas National Guard
	Battery B, 1st Battalion, 206th Field Artillery Regiment	Arkansas National Guard
	Battery C, 1st Battalion, 206th Field Artillery Regiment	Arkansas National Guard
	Battery A, 1st Battalion, 103d Field Artillery Regiment	Rhode Island National Guard
	Section 1, Battery B, 2d Battalion, 82d Field Artillery Regiment	Fort Hood, Texas
	Section 2, Battery B, 2d Battalion, 82d Field Artillery Regiment	Fort Hood, Texas
39th Brigade Support Battalion	Headquarters and Headquarters Company, 39th Support Battalion	Arkansas National Guard
	Company A, 39th Support Battalion	Arkansas National Guard
	Company B, 39th Support Battalion	Arkansas National Guard
	Company C, 39th Support Battalion	Arkansas National Guard
	1115th Transportation Company	New Mexico National Guard
	642d Maintenance Company	New Mexico National Guard
Separate Units	239th Engineer Company	Arkansas National Guard
	239th Military Intelligence Company	Arkansas National Guard
	Elements of 629th Military Intelligence Battalion	Maryland National Guard
	Elements of HHSC, 233d Military Intelligence Company	California National Guard
	Company A, 28th Signal Battalion	Pennsylvania National Guard
**1st Battalion, 153d Infantry Regiment	Headquarters and Headquarters Company, 1st Battalion, 153d Infantry Regiment	Arkansas National Guard
	Company A, 1st Battalion, 153d Infantry Regiment	Arkansas National Guard
	Company B, 1st Battalion, 153d Infantry Regiment	Arkansas National Guard
	Company C, 1st Battalion, 153d Infantry Regiment	Arkansas National Guard
	Company D, 1st Battalion, 153d Infantry Regiment	Arkansas National Guard
	Troop A, 1st Squadron, 9th Cavalry Regiment	Fort Hood, Texas

1st Battalion, 153d Infantry Regiment was task organized under 3d Brigade, 1st Cavalry Division during Operation Iraqi Freedom. Upon redeployment in 2005, the brigade immediately began a major reorganization that transformed the brigade from an enhanced separate brigade to an infantry brigade combat team under the U.S. Army's new Modular Design. This redesign of the army was intended to make the force more easily deployable by making brigades more self contained and less dependent on support organizations at the division level. Major changes for the brigade included: Transition from a brigadier general to a colonel as brigade commander; Deactivation of 3d Battalion, 153d Infantry Regiment; Deactivation of Troop E, 151st Cavalry Regiment; Deactivation of Battery C, 1st Battalion, 206th Field Artillery Regiment; Activation of 1st Squadron, 151st Cavalry Regiment, with headquarters at Warren; Activation of the Special Troops Battalion, 39th Infantry Brigade Combat Team, with headquarters at Conway; Activation of four new forward support companies, D, E, F and G under the 39th Brigade Support Battalion; Reorganization of 239th MI Company as Company B, Special Troops Battalion, 39th Infantry Brigade Combat Team; Reorganization of 239th Engineer Company as Company A, Special Troops Battalion, 39th Infantry Brigade Combat Team; Activation of Company C, Special Troops Battalion, 39th Infantry Brigade Combat Team. Along with this reorganization came a significant re-stationing of several units within the state of Arkansas.

After Hurricane Katrina hit Louisiana in August 2005, elements of the brigade combat team deployed to New Orleans by C-130s from the Little Rock Air Force Base to support the relief and recovery efforts as part of Operation Katrina. Under tactical control of the Louisiana National Guard, 39th soldiers were given the mission of providing security and food and water to an estimated 20,000 people at the New Orleans Convention Center on 2 September. By the afternoon of 3 September, all individuals staying in and around the Convention Center had been evacuated. The mission of the 39th in Louisiana grew to the point that at one time the brigade combat team was responsible for working with local officials in fourteen parishes. Elements of the 39th and the Arkansas National Guard stayed deployed in Louisiana until February 2006.

In 2006, the 7th Infantry Division was deactivated and the brigade combat team was placed under the command and control of the 36th Infantry Division. In June 2006 the brigade combat team began deploying troops along the Southwest Border with Mexico as part of Operation Jump Start. The brigade combat team manned two sectors of the border around Lordsburg and near Deming, New Mexico. Personnel occupied observation posts and reported activity along the border to the United States Border Patrol. Various battalions within the brigade combat team were tasked with supplying volunteer companies during this period. Headquarters and Headquarters Battery, 1st Battalion, 206th Field Artillery manned the Deming station from December 2006 through June 2007. While serving in Operation Jump Start, personnel from the brigade combat team were able to begin preparing for the brigade combat team's second deployment in support of Operation Iraqi Freedom.

The First and Second Arkansas were stationed in the same part of New Mexico 90 years earlier during John J. Pershing's punitive Mexican Expedition against Pancho Villa.

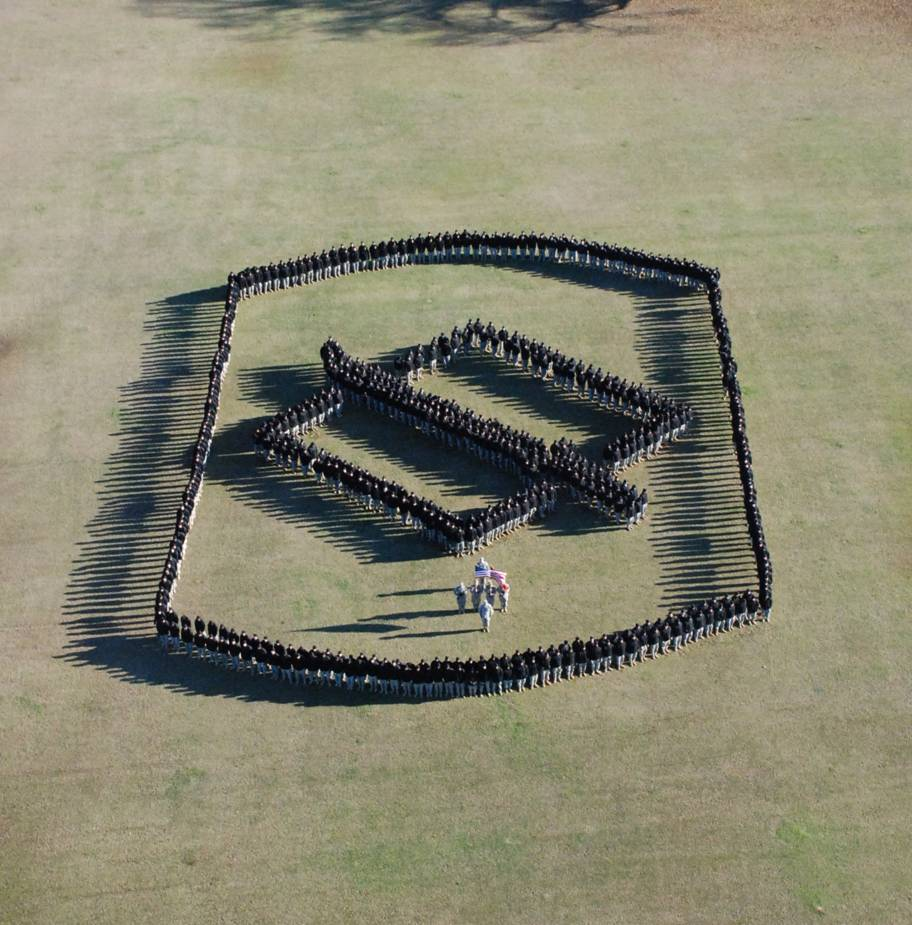
39th IBCT personnel stand forming the brigade patch on the parade field at Camp Shelby, Mississippi in 2008.

In April 2007, the 39th Infantry Brigade Combat Team received an alert for a second deployment in support of Operation Iraqi Freedom. The brigade combat team had been home almost exactly two years since demobilizing after Operation Iraqi Freedom. This deployment would be dramatically different from the first. Instead of deploying as a brigade combat team, the brigade was tasked with filling 28 unit requests for forces. These taskings involved supplying convoy security companies, force protection companies, base defense operations center and garrison command cells. Additionally, instead of an 18-month mobilization, with 12 months actually deployed to Iraq like the first tour, this mobilization would be for a total of 12 months, with approximately 10 months being deployed to the combat theater.

Once again the unit found itself with a shortage of personnel to fill these taskings. Many of these shortages were caused by unresolved medical issues from the first deployment. This time the Arkansas National Guard decided not to ask for outside support, but met the brigade combat team's need for personnel by task organizing the 217th Brigade Support Battalion from the 142d Fires Brigade, and three companies from the 87th Troop Command to the brigade combat team for this deployment. The brigade combat team was placed on duty in October 2007 to prepare for its second deployment to Iraq while still under state control. It began a 90-day pre-mobilization training period at Fort Chaffee Maneuver Training Center on 1 October 2007. This allowed the unit to perform certain tasks in Arkansas and allowed unit members to be closer to their families for a longer period of time.

The brigade combat team was placed in federal service in January 2008 and trained at Camp Shelby, Mississippi until it deployed to Iraq beginning in March 2008. Upon reaching their final destinations, most of the brigade combat team elements fell under the tactical command of Regular Army units, primarily the 4th Infantry Division and the 3rd Sustainment Command (Expeditionary). The brigade combat team and its subordinate battalions retained administrative control (ADCON) of all team elements.

Battalion	Company	Station
Headquarters and Headquarters Company, 39th Infantry Brigade Combat Team		Camp Victory
1st Battalion, 153d Infantry Regiment	Headquarters and Headquarters Company, 1st Battalion, 153d Infantry Regiment	Camp Victory
	Company A, 1st Battalion, 153d Infantry Regiment	Camp Victory
	Company B, 1st Battalion, 153d Infantry Regiment	Camp Victory
	Company C, 1st Battalion, 153d Infantry Regiment	Camp Victory
	Troop A, 1st Battalion, 151 Cavalry Regiment	International Zone
	Company A, 39th Support Battalion	Green Zone
2d Battalion, 153d Infantry Regiment	Headquarters and Headquarters Company, 2d Battalion, 153d Infantry Regiment	Al Asad Airbase
	Company A, 2d Battalion, 153d Infantry Regiment	Al Asad Airbase
	Company B, 2d Battalion, 153d Infantry Regiment	Al Asad Airbase
	Company C, 2d Battalion, 153d Infantry Regiment	Al Asad Airbase
	Company D, 2d Battalion, 153d Infantry Regiment	Al Asad Airbase
1st Squadron, 151st Cavalry Regiment	HHT, 1st Battalion, 151 Cavalry Regiment	Talil Air Base
	Troop B, 1st Battalion, 151 Cavalry Regiment	Talil Air Base
	Troop C, 1st Battalion, 151 Cavalry Regiment	Talil Air Base
	216th Military Police Company, 871st Troop Command	Talil Air Base
	Company D, 39th Support Battalion	Talil Air Base
1st Battalion, 206th Field Artillery Regiment	HHSB, 1st Battalion, 206th Field Artillery Regiment	Camp Taji
	Battery A, 1st Battalion, 206th Field Artillery Regiment	Camp Liberty,
	Battery B, 1st Battalion, 206th Field Artillery Regiment	Camp Taji
	Company G, 39th SB	Camp Taji
	1123rd Transportation Company, 871st Troop Command	Camp Taji
	1038th Horizontal Construction Company, 875th Engineer Battalion	Camp Taji
217th Brigade Support Battalion	Headquarters and Headquarters Company, 217th Brigade Support Battalion	Talil Air Base
	Company A, 217th Brigade Support Battalion	Talil Air Base
	Company B, 217th Brigade Support Battalion	Talil Air Base
	Company A, Special Troops Battalion, 39th Infantry Brigade Combat Team	Talil Air Base
	Company F, 39th Support Battalion	Talil Air Base

While deployed in Iraq from April to December 2008, the headquarters of the brigade combat team assumed the mission as the base defense operations cell for Victory Base Camp (VBC) in Baghdad, Iraq, responsible for the security of over 65,000 coalition soldiers and civilians. With this mission, the brigade combat team headquarters managed and coordinated the security of four subordinate camps and area defense operation centers (ADOCs), to include: Camp Victory, Camp Striker, Camp Slayer, and Camp Liberty. The brigade combat team headquarters managed entry control and personnel processing at four major entry control points and processed over 2,500 local national workers each day. In addition to internal base security, the brigade combat team managed terrain outside the perimeter in order to better provide defense in depth, as well as improve quality of life for Iraqi population centers adjacent to VBC. These responsibilities also included the Baghdad International Airport (BIAP) that was located in the center of VBC. The brigade combat team, in partnership with its subordinate units, coordinated nearly ten million dollars in projects that benefited local Iraqi communities.

During this same time period, the brigade combat team invested over twenty-one million dollars in base defense improvement to VBC, to include improved towers, barriers, fencing, perimeter lighting, road improvement, water projects, and general force protection initiatives. The brigade combat team was also charged with providing command and control for the Counter-RAM, Joint Intercept Battery, a system used to destroy incoming artillery, rockets and mortar rounds in the air before they hit their ground targets. For their efforts, the headquarters, brigade combat team received the Meritorious Unit Citation (MUC) from the commander, 4th Infantry Division. The brigade combat team's task organization for the base defense operations cell mission was:

Battalion	Source	Station
Headquarters and Headquarters Company, 39th Infantry Brigade Combat Team		Camp Victory
1st Battalion, 153d Infantry Regiment	Arkansas National Guard	Camp Slayer
1st Battalion, 320th Field Artillery Regiment	2d Brigade, 101st Airborne Division	Camp Liberty
Counter-Rocket/Mortar Joint Intercept Battery		Victory Base Complex
Special Troops Battalion, 4th Infantry Division	4th Infantry Division	Victory Base Complex

Task Force 1st Battalion, 153d Infantry Regiment consisted of a Headquarters Company, a Joint Visitor's Bureau Company, a Personal Security Detachment Troop and two Base Defense Companies. The task force was responsible for the force protection and defense of Camp Slayer and the Radwiniya Palace Complex within the Victory Base Camp. The Task Force 1st Battalion, 153d Infantry Regiment searched over 10,000 cars and 35,600 Iraqis to ensure no threats penetrated the perimeter. Soldiers assigned to Task Force 1st Battalion, 153d Infantry Regiment executed 996 combat patrols in the area of operations surrounding Camp Slayer and captured six high-value targets.

Task Force 2d Battalion, 153d Infantry Regiment was stationed in Al Asad Airbase, Iraq and was organized as a convoy security battalion. The battalion provided convoy security to theater sustainment convoys using the Jordan Line of Communications from Trebil to Al Asad and Forward Operating Base TQ. The unit conducted seventy six combat logistical patrols, four to six days in length, driving over 1,587,000 miles. Task Force 2d Battalion, 153d Infantry Regiment experienced one casualty during Operation Iraqi Freedom when an escort vehicle was accidentally struck while providing security at an intersection by one of the escorted vehicles.

Task Force 1st Squadron, 151st Cavalry Regiment, based at Tallil Airbase, consisted of over 800 soldiers assigned to six companies/troops/batteries consisting of active and reserve components. Task Force 1st Squadron, 151st Cavalry Regiment conducted over 700 tactical convoy security missions, without losing a single soldier due to enemy activity. The task force was responsible for long haul fuel mission between Tallil Air Base, Logistical Base Sitz, Taji and Balad Air Base. Task Force 1st Squadron, 151st Cavalry Regiment suffered one non-combat related casualty when a soldier died while working on a vehicle in the motor pool.

The Headquarters and Headquarters Battery, 1st Battalion, 206th Field Artillery Regiment was assigned to function as the Garrison Command Cell at Camp Taji, Iraq. The brigade combat team deputy commander, Colonel Kirk Van Pelt accompanied the 1st Battalion, 206th Field Artillery Regiment to Taji and acted as the garrison commander. The organic units of the 1st Battalion, 206th Field Artillery Regiment were attached to various battalions in the 1st Sustainment Brigade as convoy security companies. Batteries A and B and Company G, 39th Brigade Support Battalion were tasked to escort convoys of concrete barriers to Baghdad during the Siege of Sadr City. The "Clear, Hold, Build Concept" as it was employed in Sadr City involved cordoning several city blocks by emplacing 12–14-foot-tall (3.7–4.3 m) concrete barriers around the area to be sealed off. These barriers weighed several tons each, so an entire convoy might move only 30–40 barriers. The convoy escort team would escort the civilian trucks hauling the barriers from Camp Taji or Camp Liberty to Sadr City, and then provide security on the site for up to six hours while cranes lifted and emplaced each barrier. These missions often came under small arms fire and the threat of improvised explosive devices was constant. The 1st Battalion, 206th Field Artillery Regiment suffered no killed in action during this second deployment, although Battery B had one killed in action from an attached Regular Army unit. Sergeant Jose Ulloa, of 515th Transportation Company was killed on 8 August 2008 went the MRAP that he was riding in was struck by an improvised explosive device during a convoy security mission in Sadr City, Baghdad. Sergeant Ulloa's platoon was attached to Battery B as a convoy security platoon at the time of his death.

The brigade combat team redeployed to Camp Shelby, Mississippi in December 2008 and demobilized. Unlike the first deployment, the soldiers of the 39th were supported by a massive reintegration effort. Soldiers and their families participated in Yellow Ribbon reintegration events at the thirty-, sixty- and ninety-day post redeployment intervals. The soldiers and their families were provided with lodging at convention centers around the state for these events. The soldiers were presented with information on Employer Support of the Guard and Reserve (ESGR), employment counseling, marriage counseling, Veterans Affairs benefits, post traumatic stress disorder and suicide prevention. Each event included a job fair to assist soldiers in finding employment.

=== Casualties in Iraq ===
==== Killed ====
- Sgt. 1st Class William W. Labadie Jr., 7 April 2004
- Capt. Arthur L. Felder, 24 April 2004
- Chief Warrant Officer Four Patrick W. Kordsmeier, 24 April 2004
- Staff Sgt. Billy J. Orton, 24 April 2004
- Staff Sgt. Stacey C. Brandon, 24 April 2004
- Sgt. Kenneth Melton of Batesville, 25 April 2004
- Staff Sgt. Hesley Box, 6 May 2004
- Sgt. 1st Class Troy Leon Miranda, 20 May 2004
- Sgt. Russell L. Collier, 3 October 2004
- Staff Sgt. Christopher S. Potts, 3 October 2004
- Sgt. Ronald Wayne Baker, 13 October 2004
- Sgt. Michael Smith, 26 November 2004
- Cpl. Jimmy Buie, 4 January 2005
- Spc. Joshua Marcum, 4 January 2005
- Spc. Jeremy McHalffey, 4 January 2005
- Spc. Lyle Rymer II, 28 January 2005
- Staff Sgt. William Robbins, 10 February 2005

==== Non-battle casualties ====
- Sgt. 1st Class Anthony Lynn Woodham, 5 July 2008
- Spc. James M. Clay, 13 November 2008

== Decorations ==
Headquarters and Headquarters Company, 39th Infantry Brigade Combat Team was awarded the Meritorious Unit Commendation for the period of 1 April 2008 through 1 December 2008.

== Organization 2025 ==
- 39th Infantry Brigade Combat Team, at Camp Robinson (AR)
  - Headquarters and Headquarters Company, 39th Infantry Brigade Combat Team, at Camp Robinson (AR)
  - 1st Squadron, 134th Cavalry Regiment, in Yutan (NE) — (Nebraska Army National Guard)
    - Headquarters and Headquarters Troop, 1st Squadron, 134th Cavalry Regiment, in Yutan (NE)
    - Troop A, 1st Squadron, 134th Cavalry Regiment, in Hastings (NE)
    - Troop B, 1st Squadron, 134th Cavalry Regiment, in York (NE)
    - Troop C (Dismounted), 1st Squadron, 134th Cavalry Regiment, in Beatrice (NE)
  - 1st Battalion, 138th Infantry Regiment, at Jefferson Barracks (MO) — (Missouri Army National Guard)
    - Headquarters and Headquarters Company, 1st Battalion, 138th Infantry Regiment, at Jefferson Barracks (MO)
    - Company A, 1st Battalion, 138th Infantry Regiment, in Mexico (MO)
    - Company B, 1st Battalion, 138th Infantry Regiment, in Bridgeton (MO)
    - Company C, 1st Battalion, 138th Infantry Regiment, in Perryville (MO)
    - Company D (Weapons), 1st Battalion, 138th Infantry Regiment, in Sikeston (MO)
  - 1st Battalion, 153rd Infantry Regiment, in Malvern (AR)
    - Headquarters and Headquarters Company, 1st Battalion, 153rd Infantry Regiment, in Malvern (AR)
      - Detachment 1, Headquarters and Headquarters Company, 1st Battalion, 153rd Infantry Regiment, in Arkadelphia (AR)
    - Company A, 1st Battalion, 153rd Infantry Regiment, in Camden (AR)
      - Detachment 1, Company A, 1st Battalion, 153rd Infantry Regiment, in Prescott (AR)
    - Company B, 1st Battalion, 153rd Infantry Regiment, in Texarkana (AR)
      - Detachment 1, Company B, 1st Battalion, 153rd Infantry Regiment, in Hope (AR)
    - Company C, 1st Battalion, 153rd Infantry Regiment, in Mena (AR)
      - Detachment 1, Company C, 1st Battalion, 153rd Infantry Regiment, in De Queen (AR)
    - Company D (Weapons), 1st Battalion, 153rd Infantry Regiment, in El Dorado (AR)
  - 2nd Battalion, 153rd Infantry Regiment, in Searcy (AR)
    - Headquarters and Headquarters Company, 2nd Battalion, 153rd Infantry Regiment, in Searcy (AR)
    - Company A, 2nd Battalion, 153rd Infantry Regiment, in Harrison (AR)
      - Detachment 1, Company A, 2nd Battalion, 153rd Infantry Regiment, in Walnut Ridge (AR)
    - Company B, 2nd Battalion, 153rd Infantry Regiment, in Batesville (AR)
      - Detachment 1, Company B, 2nd Battalion, 153rd Infantry Regiment, in Augusta (AR)
    - Company C, 2nd Battalion, 153rd Infantry Regiment, in West Memphis (AR)
      - Detachment 1, Company C, 2nd Battalion, 153rd Infantry Regiment, in Forrest City (AR)
    - Company D (Weapons), 2nd Battalion, 153rd Infantry Regiment, in Beebe (AR)
  - 1st Battalion, 206th Field Artillery Regiment, in Russellville (AR)
    - Headquarters and Headquarters Battery, 1st Battalion, 206th Field Artillery Regiment, in Russellville (AR)
      - Detachment 1, Headquarters and Headquarters Battery, 1st Battalion, 206th Field Artillery Regiment, in Paris (AR)
      - Detachment 2, Headquarters and Headquarters Battery, 1st Battalion, 206th Field Artillery Regiment, at Jefferson Barracks (MO) — (Missouri Army National Guard)
      - Detachment 3, Headquarters and Headquarters Battery, 1st Battalion, 206th Field Artillery Regiment, in Yutan (NE) — (Nebraska Army National Guard)
    - Battery A, 1st Battalion, 206th Field Artillery Regiment, in Dardanelle (AR)
      - Detachment 1, Battery A, 1st Battalion, 206th Field Artillery Regiment, in Morrilton (AR)
    - Battery B, 1st Battalion, 206th Field Artillery Regiment, in Rogers (AR)
    - Battery C, 1st Battalion, 206th Field Artillery Regiment, in Booneville (AR)
      - Detachment 1, Battery C, 1st Battalion, 206th Field Artillery Regiment, in Clarksville (AR)
  - 239th Brigade Engineer Battalion, in Conway (AR)
    - Headquarters and Headquarters Company, 239th Brigade Engineer Battalion, in Conway (AR)
    - Company A (Combat Engineer), 239th Brigade Engineer Battalion, at Camp Robinson (AR)
    - Company B (Combat Engineer), 239th Brigade Engineer Battalion, in Harrisburg (AR)
    - Company C (Signal), 239th Brigade Engineer Battalion, in White Hall (AR)
    - Company D (Military Intelligence), 239th Brigade Engineer Battalion, at Camp Robinson (AR)
      - Detachment 1, Company D (Military Intelligence), 239th Brigade Engineer Battalion, at Fort Chaffee (AR) (RQ-28A UAV)
  - 39th Brigade Support Battalion, in Hazen (AR)
    - Headquarters and Headquarters Company, 39th Brigade Support Battalion, in Hazen (AR)
    - Company A (Distribution), 39th Brigade Support Battalion, in White Hall (AR)
      - Detachment 1, Company A (Distribution), 39th Brigade Support Battalion, in Stuttgart (AR)
    - Company B (Maintenance), 39th Brigade Support Battalion, in Heber Springs (AR)
    - Company C (Medical), 39th Brigade Support Battalion, in Lonoke (AR)
    - Company D (Forward Support), 39th Brigade Support Battalion, in Yutan (NE) — attached to 1st Squadron, 18th Cavalry Regiment (Nebraska Army National Guard)
    - Company E (Forward Support), 39th Brigade Support Battalion, in Benton (AR) — attached to 239th Brigade Engineer Battalion
    - Company F (Forward Support), 39th Brigade Support Battalion, in Rogers (AR) — attached to 1st Battalion, 206th Field Artillery Regiment
    - Company G (Forward Support), 39th Brigade Support Battalion, in Warren (AR) — attached to 1st Battalion, 153rd Infantry Regiment
    - Company H (Forward Support), 39th Brigade Support Battalion, in Cabot (AR) — attached to 2nd Battalion, 153rd Infantry Regiment
    - Company I (Forward Support), 39th Brigade Support Battalion, in Poplar Bluff (MO) — attached to 1st Battalion, 138th Infantry Regiment (Missouri Army National Guard)

== Commanders ==
The unit was commanded by a brigadier general until 2005 when it was reorganized as a modular brigade combat team, at which time the brigade combat team was commanded by a colonel.

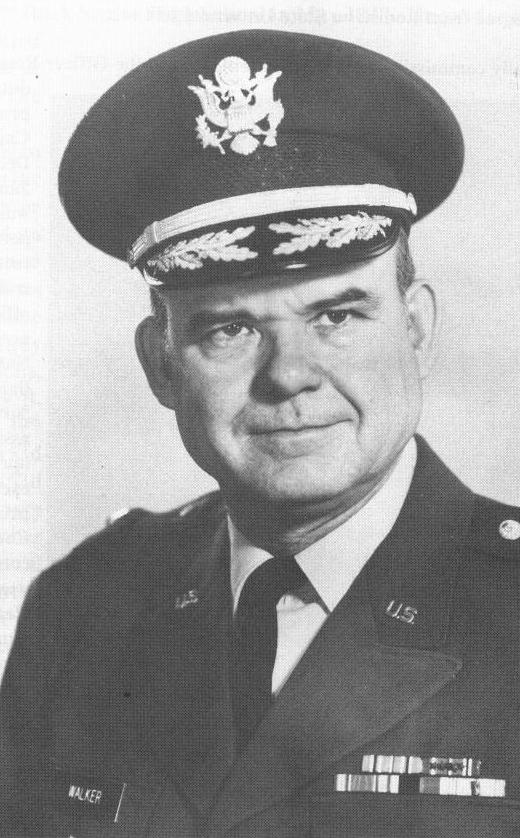
Brig. Gen. Dan Walker, 1967–1971

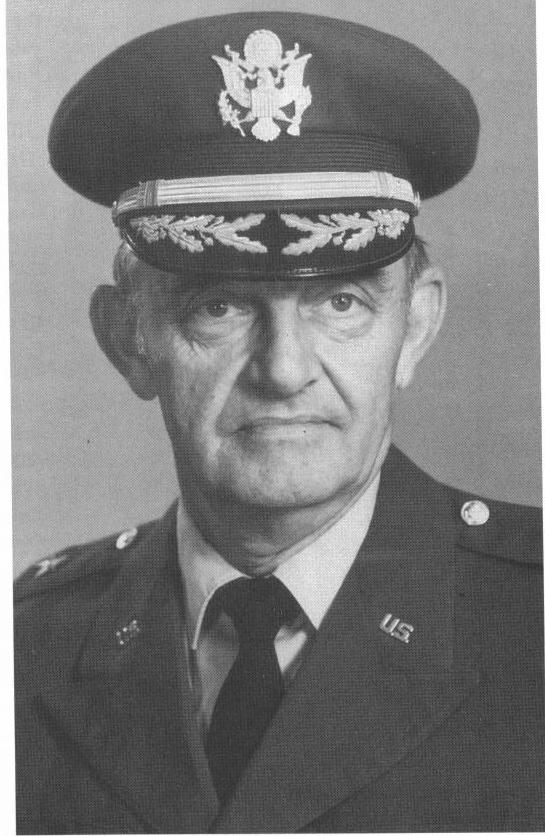
Brig. Gen. Joseph A. Chappell, 1971–1973

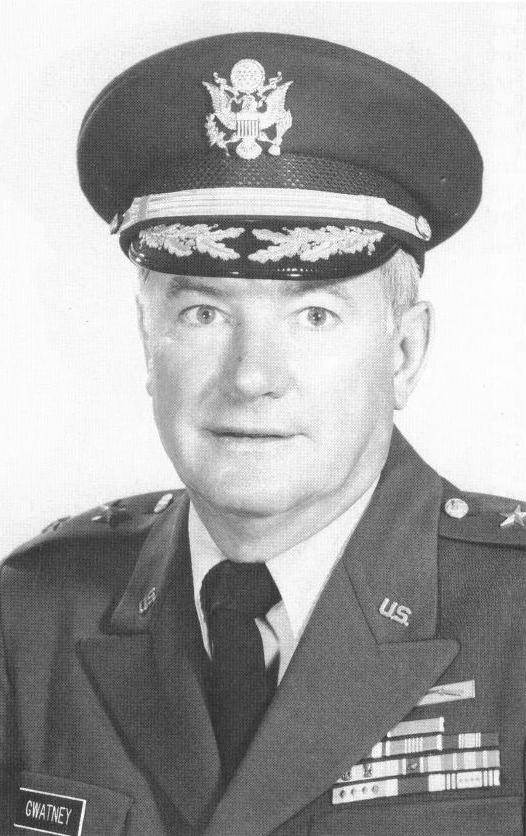
Brig. Gen. Harold L. Gwatney, 1973–1978

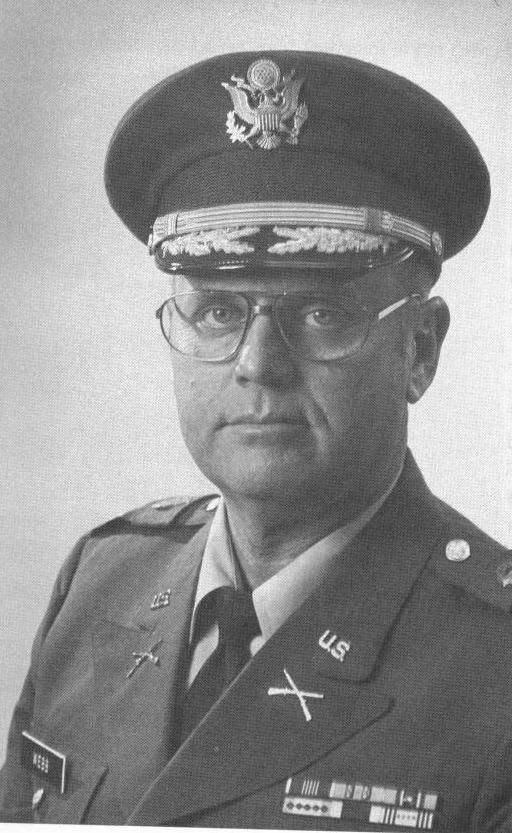
Brig. Gen. John B. Webb, Jr., 1978–1981

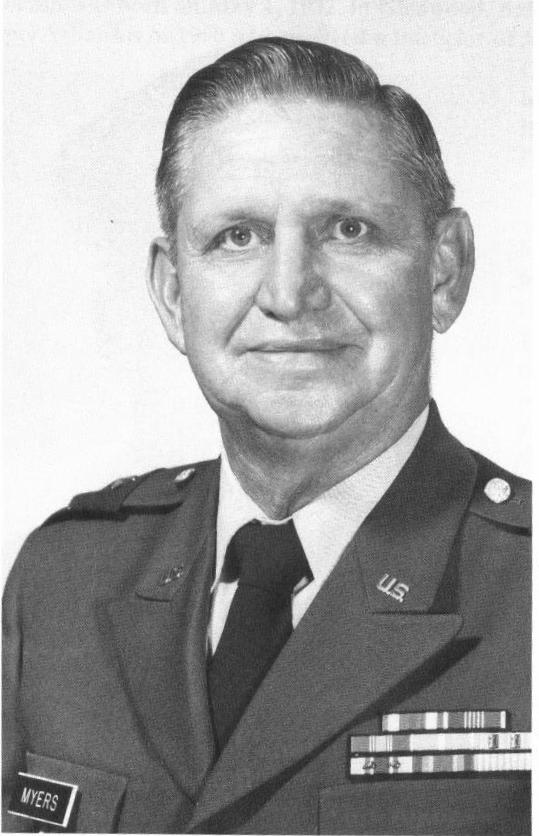
Brig. Gen. Oliver W. Myers, 1981–1984

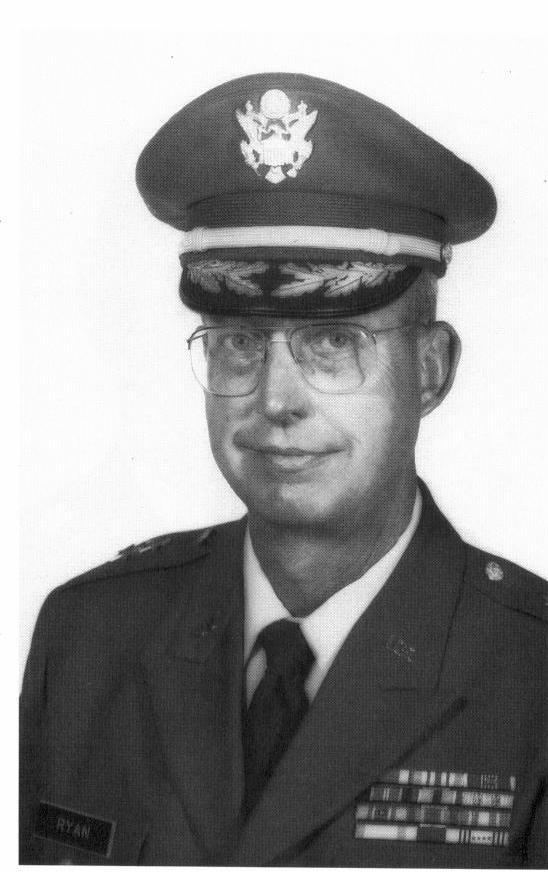
Brig. Gen. James A. Ryan, 1984–1986

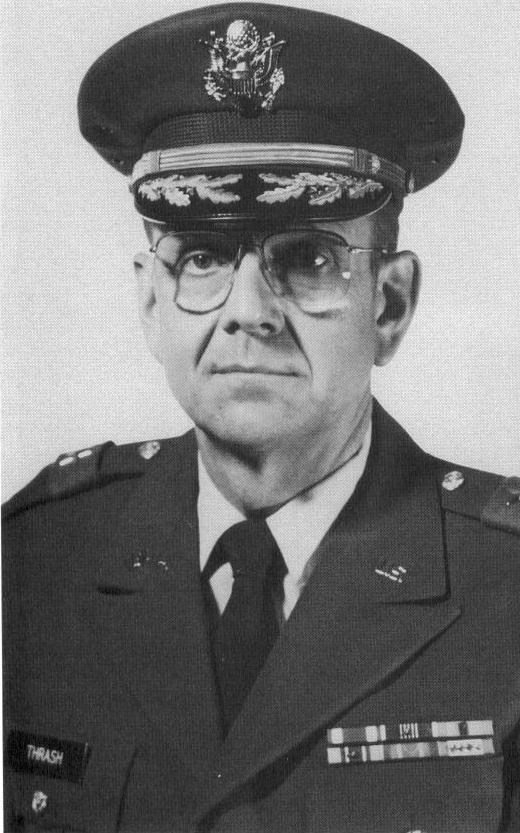
Brig. Gen. Melvin C. Thrash, 1986–1990

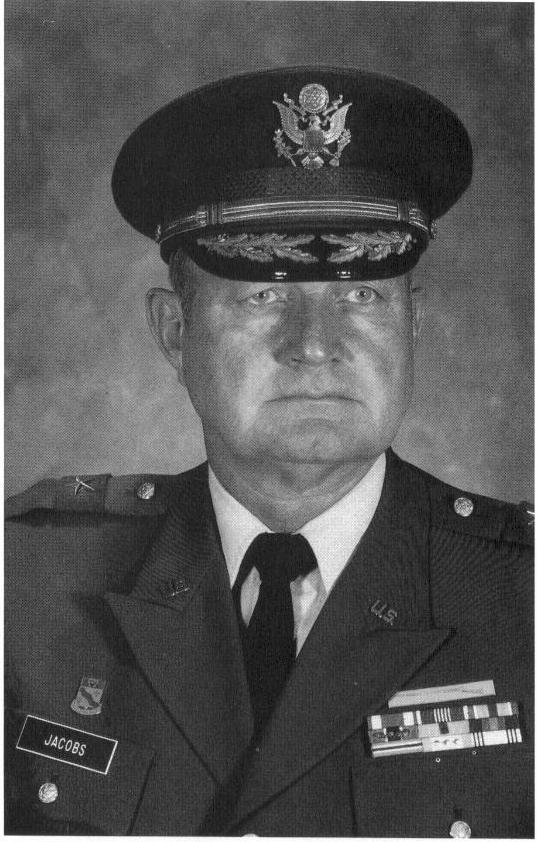
Brig. Gen. Wesley V. Jacobs, 1990–1994

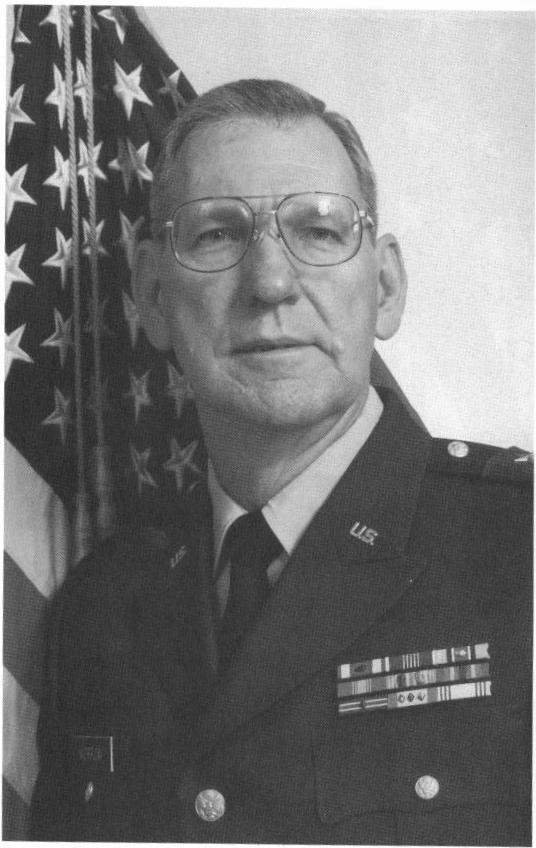
Brig. Gen. Don C. Morrow, 1994–1996

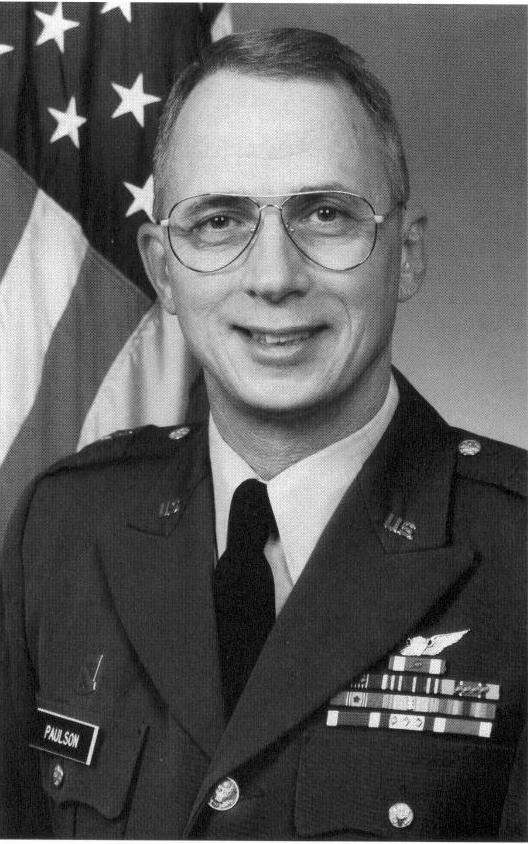
Brig. Gen. Walter A. Paulson II, 1996–2000

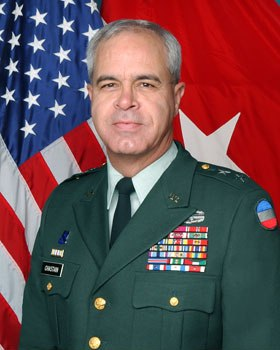
Brig. Gen. Ronald S. Chastain, 2000–2005

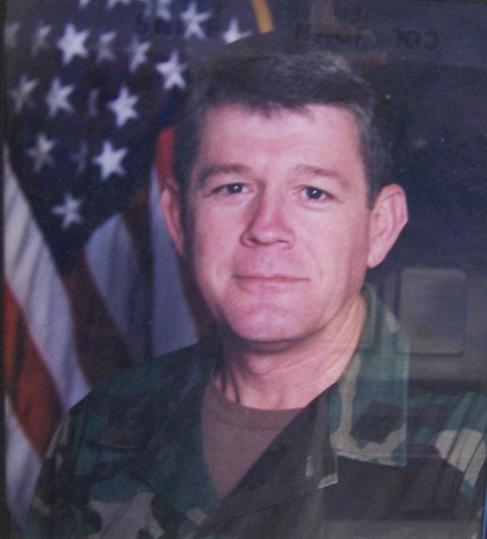
Col. George M. Ross, 2005–2007

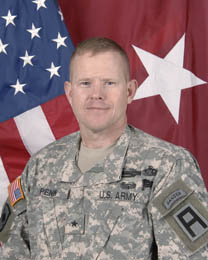
Col. Kendall W. Penn, 2007–2009

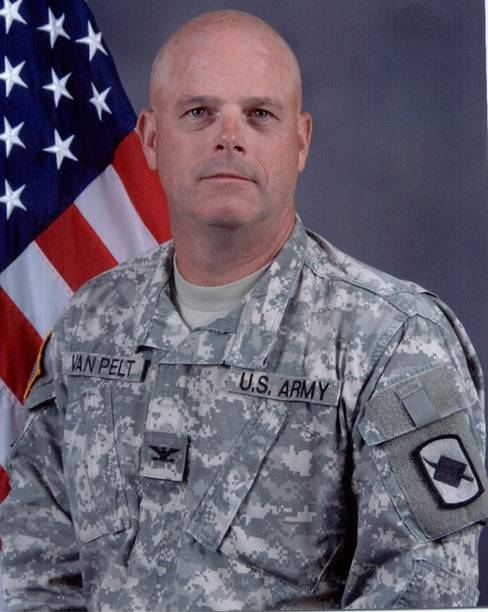
Col. Kirk E. Van Pelt, 2009–2012

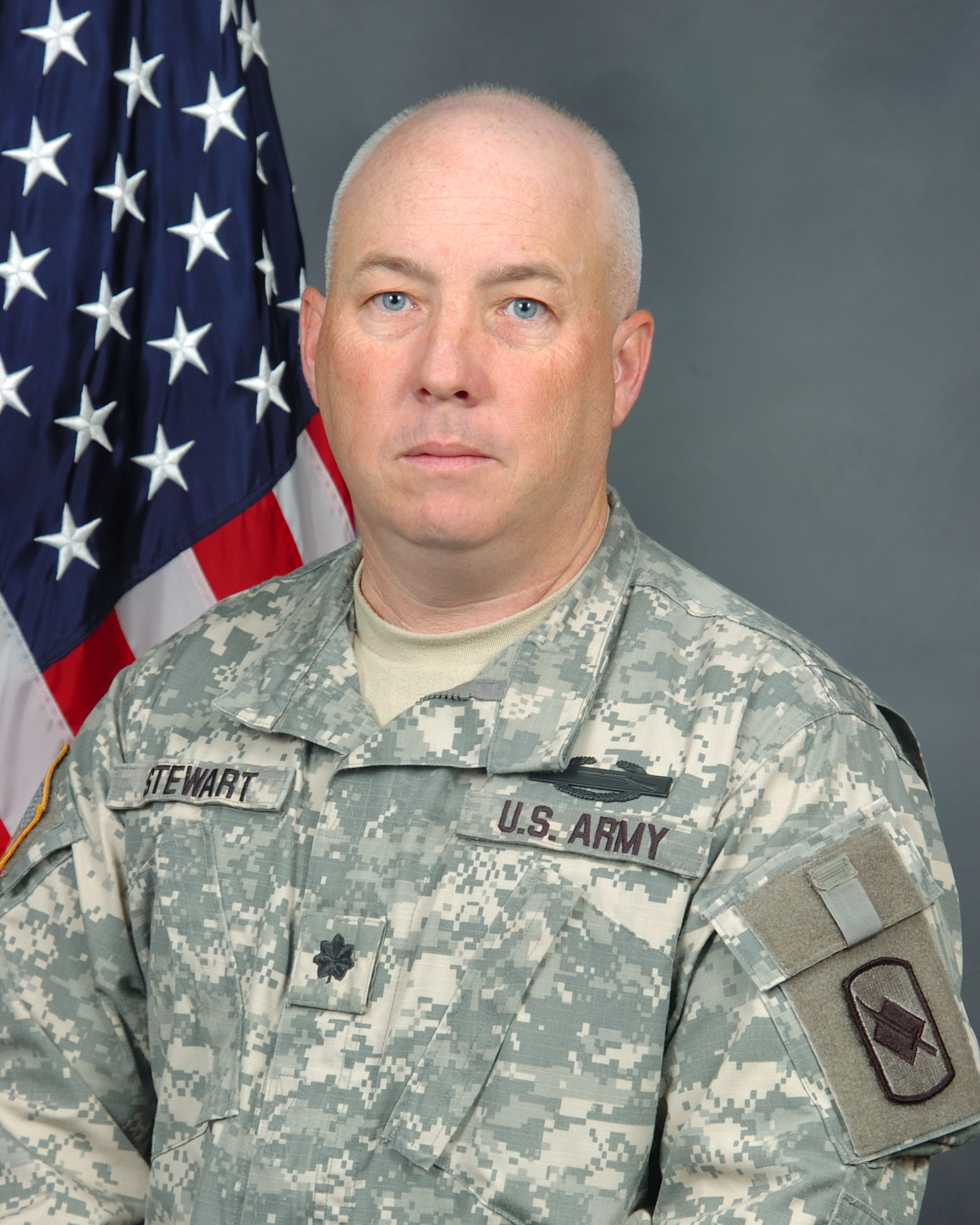
Col. John M. Stewart, 2012–2015

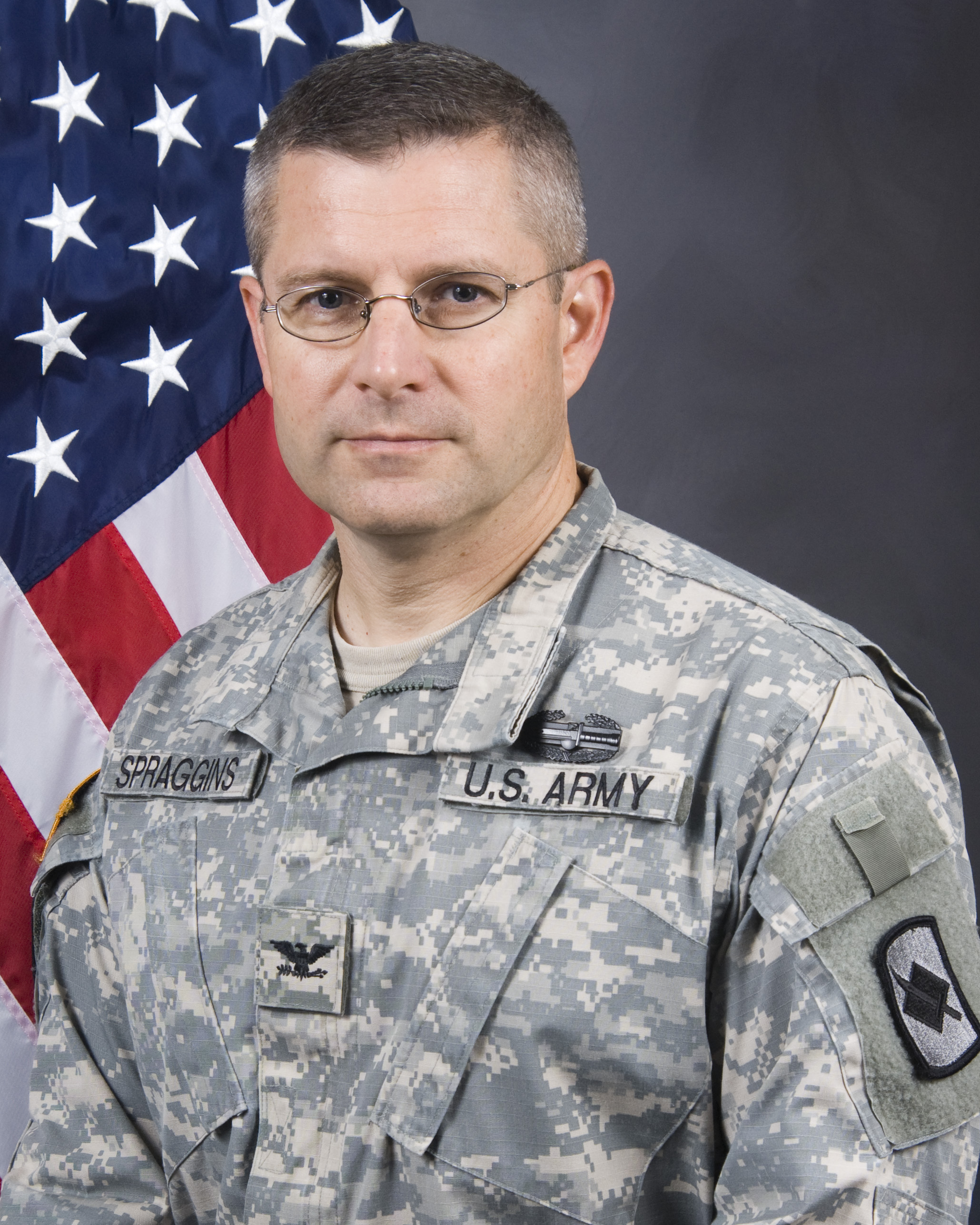
Col. Michael E. Spraggins, 2015–2018

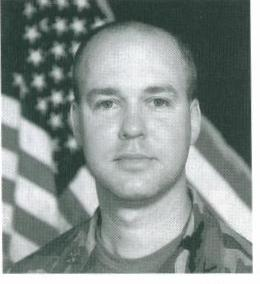
Col. Cary A. Shillcutt, 2018–2019

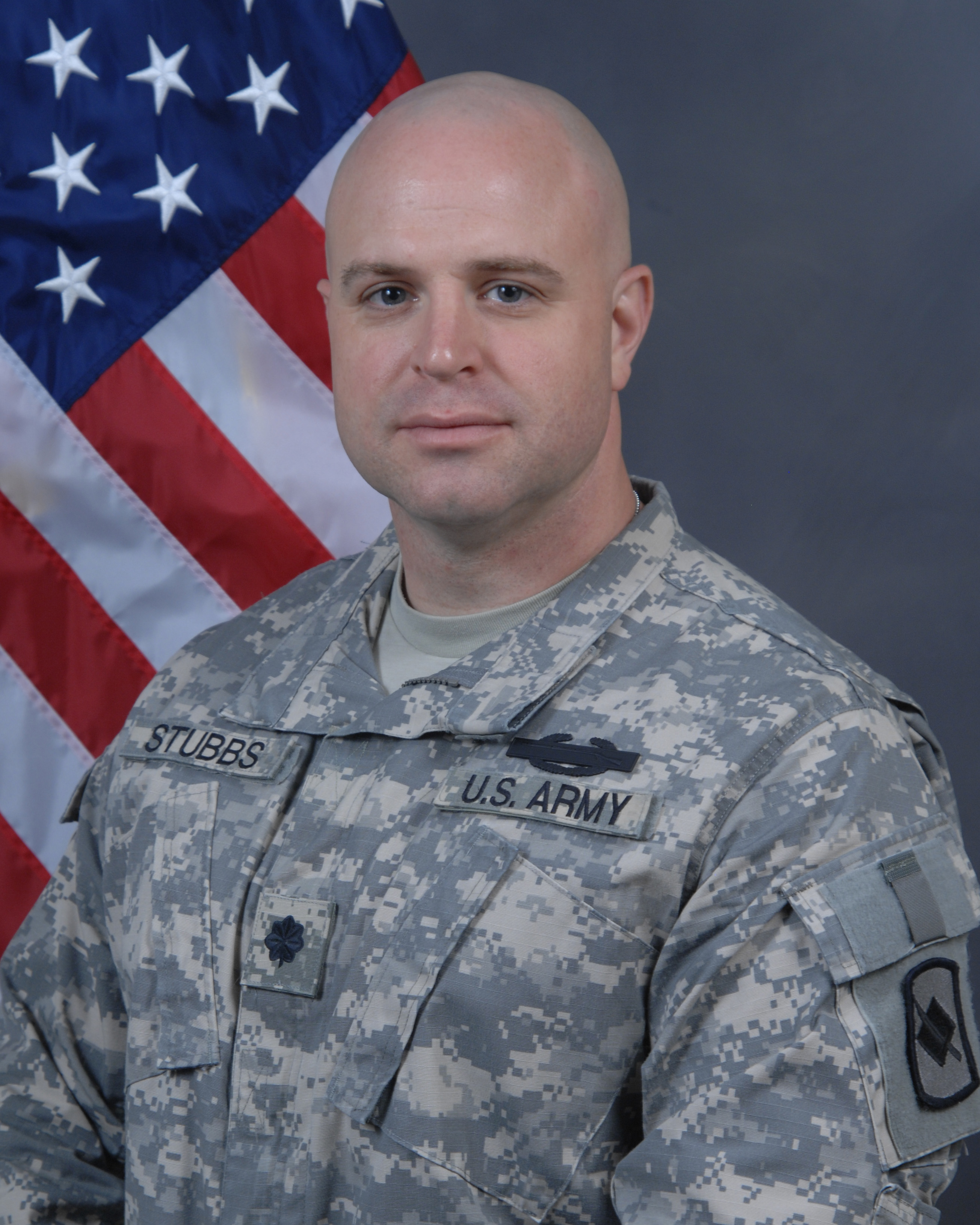
Col. Jonathan M. Stubbs, 2019–2021

== Insignia ==
=== Shoulder sleeve insignia ===
The unit's shoulder sleeve insignia consists of a Bowie knife over a diamond. The Bowie knife symbolizes the state of Arkansas, where the Bowie knife originated, and close hand-to-hand fighting which is the specialty of the light infantry. The diamond is a reference to a unique aspect of the state of Arkansas which has the only diamond field in North America in Murfreesboro. The red and blue colors are the colors of the state flag and represent both their loyalty (blue) and the blood (red) that its soldiers have shed for both the state of Arkansas, and the United States in its operations. The brigade motto is "Courage".

The Bowie knife that adorns the shoulder sleeve insignia is worn by certain field grade officers and command sergeants major in the brigade combat team. The most famous version of the Bowie knife was designed by Jim Bowie and presented to Arkansas blacksmith James Black in the form of a carved wooden model in December 1830. Black produced the knife ordered by Bowie, and at the same time created another based on Bowie's original design but with a sharpened edge on the curved top edge of the blade. Black offered Bowie his choice and Bowie chose the modified version. Knives like that one, with a blade shaped like that of the Bowie knife, but with a pronounced false edge, are today called "Sheffield Bowie" knives, because this blade shape became so popular that cutlery factories in Sheffield, England were mass-producing such knives for export to the United States by 1850, usually with a handle made from either hardwood, deer antler, or bone, and sometimes with a guard and other fittings of sterling silver.

Bowie returned, with the Black-made knife, to Texas and was involved in a knife fight with three men who had been hired to kill him. Bowie killed the three would-be assassins with his new knife and the fame of the knife grew. Legend holds that one man was almost decapitated, the second was disemboweled, and the third had his skull split open. Bowie died at the Battle of the Alamo five years later and both he and his knife became more famous. The fate of the original Bowie knife is unknown; however, a knife bearing the engraving "Bowie No. 1" has been acquired by the Historic Arkansas Museum from a Texas collector and has been attributed to Black through scientific analysis.

Black soon did a booming business making and selling these knives out of his shop in Washington, Arkansas. Black continued to refine his technique and improve the quality of the knife as he went. In 1839, shortly after his wife's death, Black was nearly blinded when, while he was in bed with illness, his father-in-law and former partner broke into his home and attacked him with a club, having objected to his daughter having married Black years earlier. Black was no longer able to continue in his trade. Black's knives were known to be exceedingly tough, yet flexible, and his technique has not been duplicated. Black kept his technique secret and did all of his work behind a leather curtain. Many claim that Black rediscovered the secret of producing true Damascus steel. In 1870, at the age of 70, Black attempted to pass on his secret to the son of the family that had cared for him in his old age, Daniel Webster Jones. However, Black had been retired for many years and found that he himself had forgotten the secret. Jones would later become Governor of Arkansas.

The birthplace of the Bowie knife is now part of the Old Washington Historic State Park which has over forty restored historical buildings and other facilities including Black's shop. The park is known as "The Colonial Williamsburg of Arkansas". The American Bladesmith Society established the William F. Moran School of Bladesmithing at this site to instruct new apprentices as well as journeyman, and mastersmiths in the art of bladesmithing.

As described in the 39th Anniversary Brigade Annual, published for the brigade combat team's 39th anniversary celebration in 2006 at the headquarters at Ricks Armory, Little Rock, Arkansas, the Bowie knife has been the individual weapon of senior leaders in the unit since the reorganization of the unit in 1967. Only knives that are procured by order of the brigade combat team commander are authorized for wear or presentation. The handle of the knife is commensurate with the leader's rank: General officers are authorized ivory handles; colonels wear knives with stag handles; field grade officers and the aide-de-camp wear black handles; CW3s and above are authorized walnut handles; command sergeants major and sergeants major are authorized the cherry wood handle; retired master sergeants are authorized cocobolo handles. The knife is worn on a pistol belt on the bear's left side with the Army Combat Uniform. The Arkansas Brigade Bowie knife has been worn by members through two deployments in support of Operation Iraqi Freedom II. The knife continues to be produced in Arkansas. Until his death, each presentation-grade knife was handmade by Mr. Jimmy Lile of Russellville, Arkansas. Mr. Lile was also commissioned to make the knives made by Sylvester Stallone in the "Rambo" movies. The Lile family continued to make the Bowie knife for the unit for several years following Mr. Lile's death. Today the brigade combat team's knife is produced by Mr. Kenny Teague of Mountainburg. The general public cannot purchase one of these knives, but can purchase a different style based on the Bowie knife pattern. Each brigade Bowie knife bears the recipient's name, social security number, rank, and military branch, as well as the maker's name and serial number of the knife.

=== Distinctive insignia ===
The stars stand for France, Spain, and the U.S., nations to which the Arkansas Territory belonged. The diamond shape was suggested by the state flag, while the wavy bar symbolizes the Arkansas River with the arrow referring to the Arkansa people. The green background alludes to the wooded hills of the Ouachita and Ozarks. The arrow in flight is used as a symbol of The Arkansas Brigade defending the state.

== See also ==
- World War I order of battle
