= Bihać Golubić Airport =

- IATA: none; ICAO: LQBI

Summary
- Airport type: Public
- Serves: Bihać
- Location: Bosnia and Herzegovina
- Elevation AMSL: 820 ft / 250 m
- Coordinates: 44°47′49.6″N 15°54′15.8″E

Map
- Location of Bihać Golubić Airport in Bosnia and Herzegovina

Runways
Direction	Length		Surface
Direction	ft	m	Surface
12/30	3,410	1,039	Grass
- Source: Landings.com

Bihać Golubić Airport (ICAO: LQBI) is a public use airport located near Bihać, Unsko-sanski Kanton, Bosnia and Herzegovina.

A new International Airport is under construction at the site, whose total value is estimated in EUR 20-25 million, of which EUR 5 million for the new runway. In 2017, the government of the Federation of Bosnia and Herzegovina entity allocated some EUR 2 million, followed by EUR 1.25 million in 2018, and EUR 1.8 million in 2019. In 2020, it received EUR 150.000 for operating costs, despite being "not even visible on online aviation radar services."

== Bihac International Airport Construction Timeline ==
- November 2017 -Bihac Airport has announced a tender for the design of the "Bihac International Airport"
- September 2018 - Bihac International Airport environmental study completed.
- September 2020 - Government of Federation of Bosnia and Herzegovina issued environmental permit for Bihac airport construction.
- May 2019 - Construction of 2.2 kilometers long Runway at Bihac Airport started.
- October 2020 - Bosnia's Euroing company completes main design of Bihac airport.
- January 2021 - Government of Federation of Bosnia and Herzegovina allocates 12 million Euros in 2021 budget for construction of Bihac Airport.
- December 2021 - Government of Federation of Bosnia and Herzegovina allocates 2,5 million Euros in 2022 budget for land expropriation for the construction of Bihac Airport.

== See also ==
- List of airports in Bosnia and Herzegovina
