= Yunis Khatayer Abbas =

Iraqi journalist

Yunis Khatayer Abbas (Arabic: يونس خضير عباس) is an Iraqi journalist who was imprisoned and tortured in 1998 for writings he had made as a journalist under Saddam Hussein. Five years later in 2003, he was detained by United States troops and imprisoned at Abu Ghraib prison for nine months. Although innocent he was suspected of plotting to assassinate then British prime minister Tony Blair along with his two brothers. During his time at Abu Ghraib he assisted American prison guards in basic translation to helping quell protests and riots; he was released in 2004.

He was the subject of the 2007 documentary The Prisoner or: How I Planned to Kill Tony Blair.

== See also ==
- Human rights in post-Saddam Iraq
- Iraq War
- Human rights violations in Iraq
