= Camp McGovern =

Camp McGovern AHP Heliport
- IATA: none; ICAO: LQMG

Summary
- Airport type: military
- Serves: Brčko
- Location: Bosnia and Herzegovina
- Elevation AMSL: 312 ft / 95 m
- Coordinates: 44°51′16.5″N 18°45′15.3″E

Map
- Location of Camp McGovern AHP Heliport in Bosnia and Herzegovina

Helipads
Number	Length		Surface
Number	ft	m	Surface
1	50	15	Asphalt
2	50	15	Asphalt
3	50	15	Asphalt
4	50	15	Asphalt
5	50	15	Asphalt
6	50	15	Asphalt
- Source: Landings.com

Camp McGovern AHP Heliport (ICAO: LQMG) was a military airport located inside Camp McGovern near Brčko, Bosnia and Herzegovina.

== See also ==
- List of airports in Bosnia and Herzegovina
