= USA-MMA =

MMA promoter based in Lafayette, Louisiana

- Company type: Private
- Industry: Mixed martial arts promotion
- Founded: August 7, 2007
- Founder: Gil Guillory
- Headquarters: Lafayette, Louisiana, United States
- Website: http://www.usa-mma.org

USA-MMA is a mixed martial arts (MMA) organization based in the United States that was created in 2007 by Gil Guillory, a twenty-year veteran of Mixed Martial Arts. USA-MMA features up and coming MMA stars and veterans based in and around Louisiana. They adhere to the North American Unified Rules of MMA. USA-MMA also has both amateur and professional rankings and titles, but there are no formal declarations of what qualifications a fighter must have to turn pro by the organization.

USA-MMA XIV, Return of the Champions, will feature two UFC World Heavyweight Champions. Ricco Rodriguez will be in the co-main event and the "world's most dangerous man", Ken Shamrock, will make his USA-MMA debut. This event is being held at The Cajundome in Lafayette, Louisiana.

== Final Champions ==
- Lightweight (155 lb.) Amateur Champion :

Paul Hebbler, Gladiator, Baton Rouge, Louisiana

- Middleweight (185 lb.) Amateur Champion :

Jeff Wuenschel, Cajun Karate, Lafayette, Louisiana

- Middleweight (185 lb.) Professional Champion :

Charlie Rader, Gracie Barra, Southshore

- Light Heavyweight (205 lb.) Professional Champion :

Roman Pizzolato, Gracie Barra, Baton Rouge, Louisiana

== STRIKE ==
Starting with USA-MMA 6: Night of Champions, USA-MMA has started a new strain of Mixed Martial Arts called STRIKE. Fought in a normal sized cage, STRIKE competitors are allowed to use punches, kicks, elbows, and knees, but are not allowed to clinch, go for a takedown, or use any wrestling skills. This new division is patterned after the world-famous K-1 organization, with a few subtle changes. STRIKE is developed to give boxers, kickboxers and other striking sports an opportunity to participate in more events. STRIKE also allows these participants, of striking sports, to transition into MMA. USA-MMA could possibly make this another division but currently fighters are allowed to move back and forth between STRIKE and normal MMA.

== List of shows ==
No.	Event	Date	Venue	Location
1	Natural Disaster	April 12, 2008	SugArena	New Iberia, Louisiana
2	Lafayette v. The World	June 10, 2008	Blackham Coliseum	Lafayette, Louisiana
3	Natural Disaster 2	August, 2008	SugArena	New Iberia, Louisiana
4	Border War	October, 2008	West Cal Arena	Sulphur, Louisiana
5	Salute to US Military	November 2008	Beauregard Parish Covered Arena	De Ridder, Louisiana
6	Night of Champions	February 28, 2009	Blackham Coliseum	Lafayette, Louisiana
7	River City Rampage	May 16, 2009	Shreveport Convention Center	Shreveport, Louisiana
8	Natural Disaster 3	August 1, 2009	SugArena	New Iberia, Louisiana
9	Team Louisiana versus Team Florida	October 9, 2009	Baton Rouge River Center	Baton Rouge, Louisiana
10	Border War 2	November 13, 2009	Lake Charles Civic Center	Lake Charles, Louisiana
11	Night of Champions 2	March 6, 2010	Cajundome	Lafayette, Louisiana
12	LEGENDS	May 22, 2010	Coushatta Casino Resort	Kinder, Louisiana
13	Stacked	July 31, 2010	Baton Rouge River Center	Baton Rouge, Louisiana
14	Return of the Champions	October 16, 2010	Cajundome	Lafayette, Louisiana
15	Rumble at Diamondjacks	November 13, 2010	Diamondjacks Casino	Shreveport, Louisiana
16	USA-MMA 16	May 7, 2011	Evangeline Downs Racetrack and Casino	Opelousas, Louisiana
17	Night of Champions 3	March 3, 2012	Cajundome	Lafayette, Louisiana
