= Michael Tucker (director) =

American documentary film director

Michael Tucker is an American documentary film director, best known for his recent documentary The Prisoner or: How I Planned to Kill Tony Blair. He also directed a documentary in Iraq during the 2003 Iraqi War entitled Gunner Palace. He was born in Hawaii.

== The Iraqi Experience ==
From May 2003 to June 2004 he traveled to Iraq numerous times during the height of the Iraqi insurgency for the purpose of putting together a documentary. For two months he lived with the 2/3 Artillery, a.k.a. "The Gunners" in one of Uday Hussein's palaces where they were stationed. His film was aimed at capturing the lives and humanity of the soldiers who were situated in the center of Baghdad, one of the most volatile regions of the city. The film was co-directed by Petra Epperlein and distributed by Palm Pictures, with a release in the United States on March 4, 2005.

He also co-directed a 16-minute short film called The Last Cowboy with Epperlein in 1998.

== Filmography ==
- The Last Cowboy (1998; short film)
- Gunner Palace (2004)
- The Prisoner or: How I Planned to Kill Tony Blair (2006)
- Bulletproof Salesman (2008)
- How to Fold a Flag (2009)
- Fightville (2010)
- The Flag (2013)
- Karl Marx City (2016)
