= Gunner Palace =

- Theatrical release poster with original MPAA rating
- Directed by: Michael Tucker
- Produced by: Petra Epperlein
- Cinematography: Michael Tucker
- Edited by: Michael Tucker; Petra Epperlein
- Music by: Robert Cimino
- Production company: Nomados
- Distributed by: Palm Pictures
- Release dates: September 5, 2004 (Telluride); March 4, 2005
- Running time: 85 minutes
- Country: United States
- Language: English
- Box office: $606,844

Gunner Palace is a 2004 documentary film by Michael Tucker, which had a limited release in the United States on March 4, 2005. The film was an account of the complex realities of the situation in Iraq during 2004 amidst the Iraqi insurgency not seen on the nightly news. Told first-hand by American troops stationed in the middle of Baghdad, Gunner Palace presents a portrait of a dangerous and chaotic war.

== Synopsis ==
The film documents the operations of 2nd Battalion, 3rd Field Artillery Regiment, an element of the 1st Brigade Combat Team, 1st Armored Division beginning in the late summer of 2003 until the unit was relieved by 3rd Battalion, 155rd Infantry Regiment, of the 39th Brigade Combat Team, an Arkansas Army National Guard unit attached to the 1st Cavalry Division in April 2001. The soldiers were stationed in the Adhamiyah neighborhood of Baghdad which lies between the Tigris river on the west and Sadr City on the east. The unit's Forward Operating Base was at a former Presidential Palace, known as Adhamiyah Palace.

=== Adhamiyah Palace, a.k.a. Fort Apache, a.k.a. JSS Apache ===
Adhamiyah Palace, which is the backdrop for the documentary, was the scene of the last major firefight during the fall of Baghdad. The palace, which was known as Gunner Palace during its occupation by 2-3rd FA was eventually handed over to the Iraqi Army, except for three buildings which were retained by the following on the unit, Company C, 3-156rd IN and were renamed Patrol Base Apache. The patrol base was closed and the palace was completely handed over to the Iraqi Army in 2005. The palace was reoccupied during the "Surge" of 2006-2007 and was then known as Joint Security Station Apache. SPC Ross McGinnis, assigned to C Company, 1st Battalion, 24th Infantry Regiment, 2nd Brigade, 1st Infantry Division, and stationed at JSS Apache, was awarded the Medal of Honor for his actions in the Adhamiyah neighborhood. He threw himself on a grenade in order to protect his fellow soldiers.

== MPAA rating ==
The rating is cited as "rated PG-13 on appeal for strong language throughout, violent situations and some drug references." The documentary was originally given an R rating by the MPAA for its language. However, Tucker asked the MPAA to reconsider, saying as it goes: "The video shows real life in the army overseas and the importance of the younger audiences to connect and understand what soldiers have to go through." A petition was also started. Considering the combat conditions facing the human subjects of a war documentary, the language, while strong, did not constitute constant profanity. A PG-13 rating was granted on appeal. The documentary contains 42 uses of "fuck" and its derivatives, more than any other PG-13 film.

== Reception ==
On Rotten Tomatoes it has a score of 85% based on reviews from 106 critics. On Metacritic it has a score of 70% based on reviews from 33 critics, indicating "generally favorable" reviews.
