= List of Ouachita Baptist University alumni =

Ouachita Baptist University is a private university in Arkadelphia, Arkansas. Following are some of its notable alumni.

== Education ==
- Thomas Lee Ballenger (1905) – educator and historian
- Henry G. Bennett (1907) – president of both Southeastern Oklahoma State University and Oklahoma State University and director of the Point Four Program
- Doak S. Campbell (non-degreed) – president of Florida State College for Women (1941–1947) and then Florida State University (1947–1957)
- Leon Green (1908) – legal scholar, dean of Northwestern University School of Law, and professor at Yale Law School
- Nell I. Mondy (1943) – biochemist and professor at Cornell University for fifty years
- Andrew Westmoreland (1979) – president of Samford University and Ouachita Baptist University

== Entertainment ==
- Shelley Breen – member of Christian pop music group Point of Grace
- Steven Bryant – composer and conductor for wind ensemble and orchestra
- Alyse Eady – news anchor and Miss Arkansas 2010
- Denise Jones – member of Christian pop music group Point of Grace
- Terry Jones – member of Christian pop music group Point of Grace
- Heather Payne – member of Christian pop music group Point of Grace
- Barrett Pfeiffer – Big Brother 28 cast member

== Law ==
- Winston Bryant (1960) – attorney general of Arkansas, secretary of state of Arkansas, and 14th lieutenant governor of Arkansas

== Military ==
- Lucien Abraham – college football coach and adjutant general of Arkansas
- James W. Kelly (1936) – chief of Chaplains of the United States Navy 1965–1970; rear admiral in the United States Navy
- John H. Yancey (non-degreed) – highly decorated United States Marine

== Nonprofit leadership ==
- Annie Guinn Massey – President General of the United Daughters of the Confederacy
- Pamela Rouse Wright – 46th president general of the Daughters of the American Revolution

== Politics ==
- Winston Bryant (1960) – attorney general of Arkansas, secretary of state of Arkansas, and 14th lieutenant governor of Arkansas
- Mark Darr (1997) – lieutenant governor of Arkansas between 2011 and 2014
- Gary Deffenbaugh – Arkansas House of Representatives
- Lance Eads (1992) – Arkansas House of Representatives
- Joyce Elliott (1981) – Arkansas Senate and Arkansas House of Representatives
- Jake Files (non-degreed) – Arkansas Senate
- Chad Griffin (non-degreed) – political strategist best known for his work advocating for LGBT rights in the United States; former president of Human Rights Campaign
- Fonda Hawthorne – Arkansas House of Representatives
- David Hillman – Arkansas House of Representatives
- DeAnna Hodges – Arkansas House of Representatives
- William J. Holloway (1910) – governor of Oklahoma 1929–1931
- Jon Hubbard (1968) – Arkansas House of Representatives
- Janet Huckabee – First Lady of Arkansas 1996–2007
- Mike Huckabee (1978) – governor of Arkansas 1996–2007; 2008 and 2016 Republican presidential candidate
- Cole Jester (2019) – 35th Arkansas secretary of state 2025–present
- Susan McDougal (1976) – involved in Whitewater controversy, author of The Woman Who Wouldn't Talk
- Catherine Dorris Norrell – U.S. House of Representatives from Arkansas 1961-1963
- Chris Richey – Arkansas House of Representatives
- Steve Russell (1985) – U.S. House of Representatives from Oklahoma, 2015 to 2019
- David J. Sanders (1967) – Arkansas Senate and Arkansas House of Representatives
- Sarah Huckabee Sanders (2004) – former White House press secretary and governor of Arkansas
- Matthew Shepherd (1998) – Arkansas House of Representatives
- Bryan Slaton (2000) – Texas House of Representatives
- Boyd Tackett (non-degreed) – U.S. House of Representatives from Arkansas 1949–1953
- Richard Womack (1997) – Arkansas House of Representatives

== Religion ==
- H. Dale Jackson – Baptist minister, denominational leader and ethicist
- James W. Kelly (1936) – Chief of Chaplains of the United States Navy from July 1965 to July 1970 and a rear admiral in the United States Navy
- Dwight McKissic (1978) - Baptist minister

== Sports ==
- Lucien Abraham – college football coach and Adjutant General of Arkansas
- Carl Allen – professional football player
- Al Baggett – college football coach
- Kiehl Frazier – college football player
- Linda Gamble – pioneer in women's basketball and Pan American Games silver medalist
- Cliff Harris – professional football player with the Dallas Cowboys (1970–1979) and Hall of Fame inductee
- Fitz Hill – college football coach and college administrator
- Travis Jackson – professional baseball player for New York Giants in the 1920s and 1930s and inductee in the Baseball Hall of Fame
- Gregory Junior – professional football player for the Jacksonville Jaguars
- Bill LaFitte – professional football player
- William Miller – professional football player in the Canadian Football League and the USFL
- Daniel Munday – professional basketball player
- Alexander Myres – professional football player for the Detroit Lions
- Ed Neal – professional football player or the Green Bay Packers in the National Football League
- Tommie Patterson – professional basketball player for the Washington Bullets (1972–1973)
- Julius Pruitt – professional football player for the Miami Dolphins (2009 to 2012)
- Steve Roberts – former head football coach at Southern Arkansas University, Northwestern State University, and Arkansas State University
- Carey Selph – professional baseball player
- Paul Sharp – college football coach
- Phillip Supernaw – professional football player
- Aaron Ward – professional baseball player for New York Yankees (1917–26), Chicago White Sox (1927) and Cleveland Indians (1928)
- Mel Wright – professional baseball player, coach, and scout
