= Admiral Kelly =

Admiral Kelly may refer to:

- Benedictus Marwood Kelly (1785–1867), British Royal Navy admiral
- Howard Kelly (Royal Navy officer) (1873–1952), British Royal Navy admiral
- James M. Kelly (Maryland politician) (born 1960), U.S. Coast Guard Reserve rear admiral
- James W. Kelly (1913–1989), U.S. Navy rear admiral
- John Kelly (Royal Navy officer) (1871–1936), British Royal Navy admiral
- Robert J. Kelly (born 1938), U.S. Navy admiral
