= Thomas Ballenger =

Thomas Ballenger may refer to:

- Thomas Cass Ballenger (1926–2015), American politician
- Thomas Lee Ballenger (1882–1987), American historian, author and teacher
