= General Abraham =

General Abraham may refer to:

- Erich Abraham (1895–1971), Nazi Germany Wehrmacht general
- Lucien Abraham (1902–1960), Arkansas Army National Guard major general
- Roman Abraham (1891–1976), Polish Army brigadier general
- William Abraham (British Army officer) (1897–1980), British Army major general
