= 153rd Infantry Regiment (United States) =

Infantry regiment of the United States Army

153rd Infantry Regiment (First Arkansas)
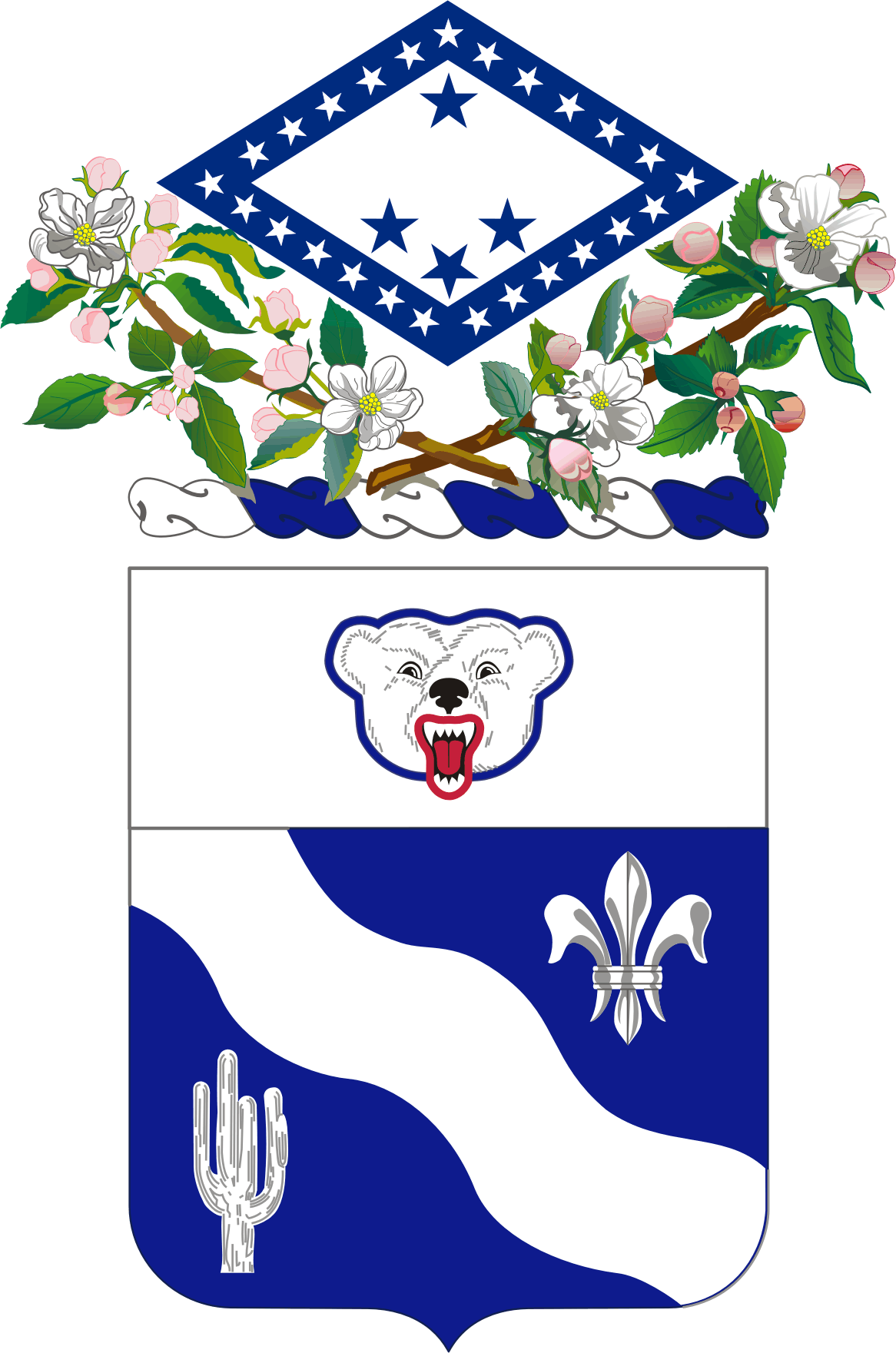
- Coat of Arms
- Active: 1890–1919; 1920–1944; 1946–present
- Country: United States
- Allegiance: Arkansas
- Branch: Army
- Type: Infantry
- Size: Regiment
- Part of: Arkansas Army National Guard
- Regimental Headquarters: Malvern, Arkansas
- Nickname: "First Arkansas"
- Motto: Let's Go
- Facings: Light blue
- Campaigns: World War I World War II: Aleutian Islands; War on terrorism: Iraq; Transition of Iraq; Iraqi Governance; Iraqi Surge
- Decorations: Meritorious Unit Commendation (Army)

Commanders
- Notable commanders: Colonel Lucien Abraham

Insignia
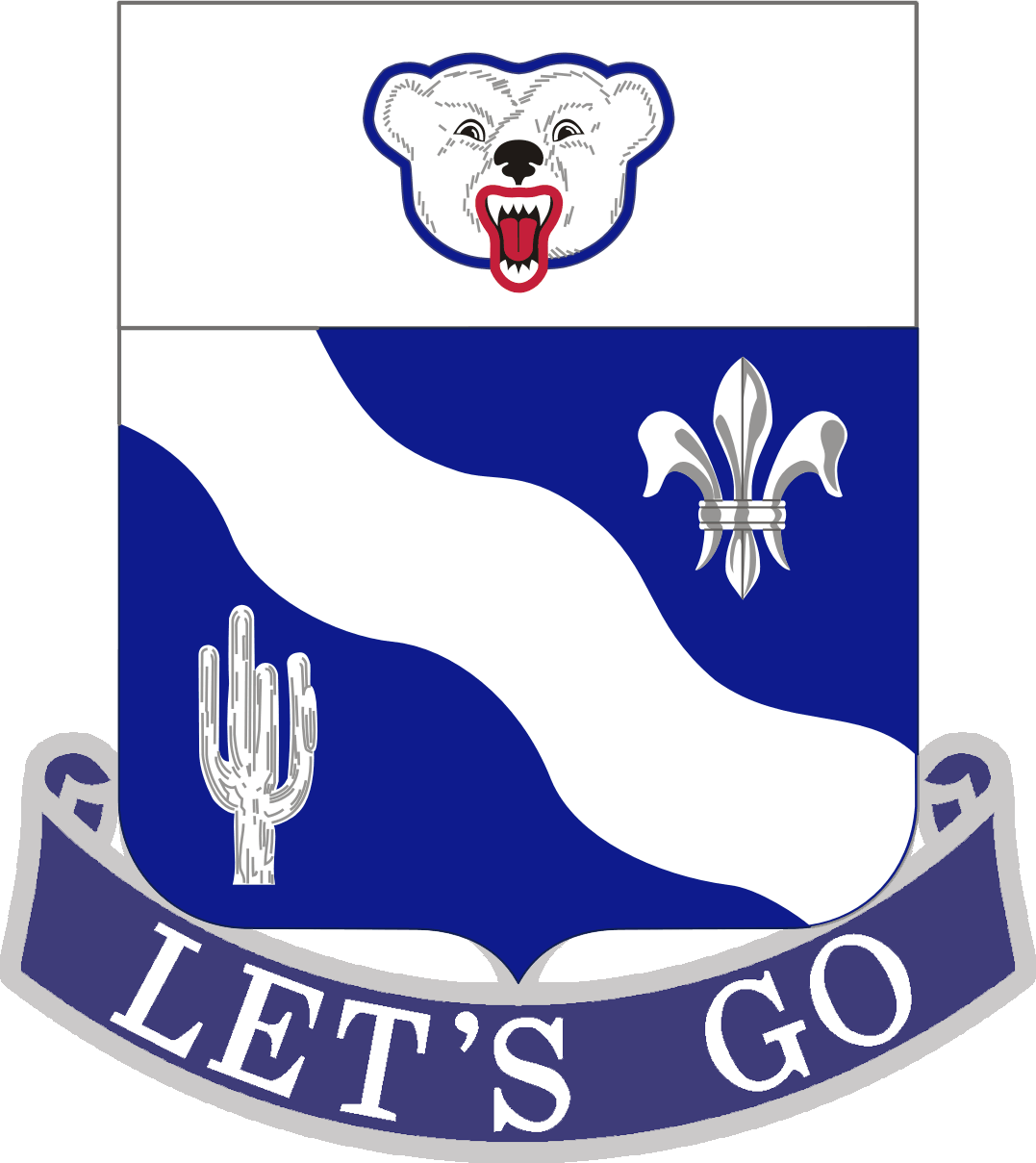
- Regimental Insignia

The 153rd Infantry Regiment (First Arkansas) is a United States infantry regiment, currently represented in the Arkansas Army National Guard by the 1st Battalion, 153rd Infantry, headquartered at Malvern, Arkansas, and 2nd Battalion, 153rd Infantry, headquartered at Searcy, Arkansas, elements of the 39th Brigade Combat Team. The regiment was also represented by the 3rd Battalion, 153rd Infantry Regiment headquartered at Warren, Arkansas until that unit was deactivated on 5 September 2005. The regiment was activated as the 1st Arkansas Volunteer Infantry for the Spanish–American War, but did not deploy overseas. The regiment was activated for World War I, redesignated as the 153rd Infantry and shipped to France as a part of the 39th Division, but became a replacement division and personnel were reassigned to other AEF units. The regiment was activated for World War II and deployed to the Aleutian Islands, participating in the Aleutian Islands Campaign. Recently, elements of the regiment have participated in two deployments in support of Operation Iraqi Freedom, in 2004 and again in 2008.

== Formation of the 1st Arkansas, State Troops ==
Two units claimed the name '1st Arkansas' during the American Civil War, one Confederate and one on the Union side, but neither have a direct connection to the 153d Infantry. These units were each recruited in the state by national governments for service in their respective army. Neither of them had any connection to the militia units of the State of Arkansas.

The 1st Arkansas (State Troops) was organized from Volunteer Companies organized in the Arkansas State Militia. Several of these Volunteer Companies had participated in the seizure of the Federal Arsenal at Little Rock in January 1861. These units were enrolled in state service on 14 May 1861 at Mound City, six miles upstream of Memphis on the Mississippi River. Captain Patrick R. Cleburne, of the Yell Rifles, was appointed colonel of the regiment. This unit was placed under the command of Col. Patrick Cleburne, and was enrolled in Confederate service on 23 July 1861, at Pitman's Ferry, AR and was initially designated as the '1st Arkansas Infantry'. However, the Confederate War Department discovered that there was already a 1st Arkansas Infantry, under Colonel James Fleming Fagan. The 1st Regiment, Arkansas State Troops, was thus redesignated as the 15th Arkansas Infantry Regiment, on 31 December 1861. Due to battle losses, the 13th and 15th Arkansas Regiments were consolidated on 20 December 1862, just before the Battle of Murfreesboro. Toward the end of the civil war, ten depleted Arkansas regiments, including the 15th Arkansas, were merged to form the 1st Arkansas Consolidated Infantry, 9 April 1865. This regiment surrendered with the Army of Tennessee at Greensboro, North Carolina, 26 April 1865. The 15th Arkansas was composed of Militia units from the following counties:

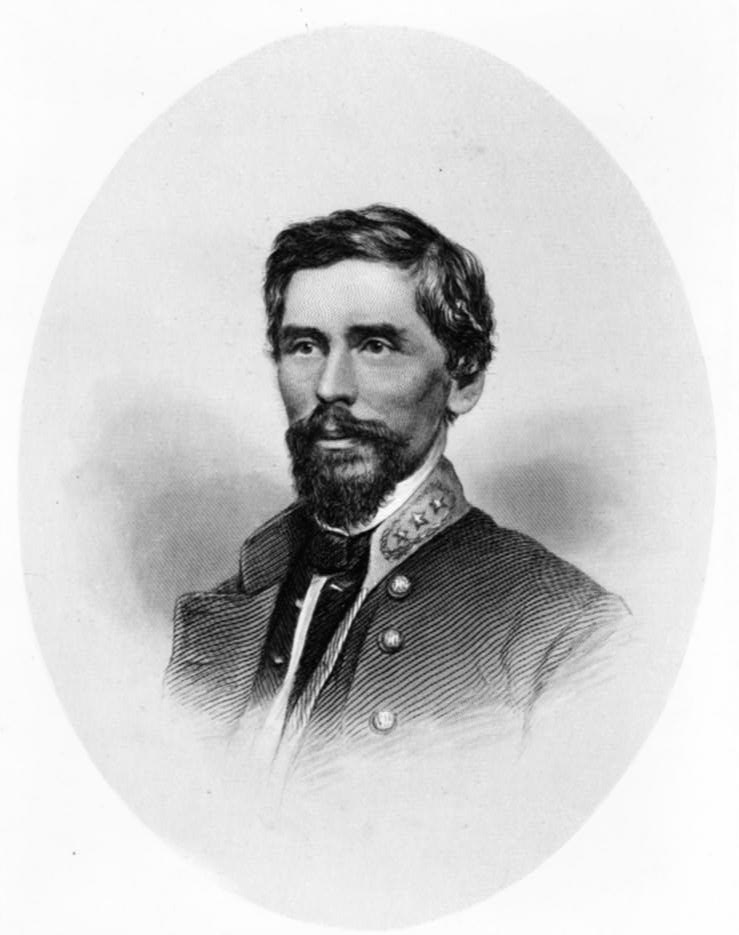
COL Patrick Cleburne, Commander, 1st Arkansas State Troops, 15th Arkansas, Confederate States Army

Company	Name	County	Militia Regiment	Commander	Organization Date
Company A	"Harris Guards"	Monroe	35th Militia Regiment	Capt. James T. Harris	27 May 1861
Company B	"Jefferson Guards"	Jefferson	24th Militia Regiment	Capt. Charles H. Carlton	24 September 1860
Company C	"Yell Guards"	Jefferson	None	Capt. Francis M. McNally	Unknown
Company D	"Rector Guards"	Prairie	50th Militia Regiment	Capt. George W. Glenn	12 February 1861
Company E	"Napoleon Grays"	Desha	6th Militia Regiment	Capt. Henry E. Green	28 February 1861
Company F	"Yell Riflemen"	Phillips	12th Militia Regiment	Capt. Patrick R. Cleburne	29 January 1861
Company G	"Hindman Guards"	White	None	Capt. Henry B. Blakemore	18 April 1861
Company H	"Phillips Guards"	Phillips	12th Militia Regiment	Capt. George Otey	29 January 1861
Company I	"Tyronza Rebels"	Mississippi	None	Capt. Robert L. Harding	3 June 1861
Company K	"Monroe Blues"	Monroe	35th Militia Regiment	Capt. Gaston K. Baldwin	16 May 1861

No connection between the 15th Arkansas Infantry Regiment (1st Arkansas State Troops) and the 1st Infantry, Arkansas State Guard, from which the 153rd Infantry Regiment was created, is formally recognized by the United States Army Center of Military History. Arkansas militia units were very active during the Reconstruction era, but interest in the militia waned in the years after Reconstruction ended and very little activity occurred above the local level for many years.

== Post Civil War ==
While the State Militia was heavily engaged in numerous civil disturbances following the Civil War, most notably the Brooks Baxter War, very little is known about the regimental organization of the units involved in these Reconstruction era conflicts. The Arkansas State Guard did not begin to take its modern form until the late 1890s. It was organized between 1890 and 1894 in the Arkansas State Guard as the 1st Regiment of Infantry, with its headquarters in Little Rock.

=== Post Reconstruction ===
Officially, the state militia of the 1880s and early 1890s consisted of the 1st and 2nd Infantry regiments, one battery of artillery, one troop cavalry, and one signal unit. In reality, interest in the state militia had waned following Reconstruction, and the state legislature failed to appropriate any funds to support the militia. The legislature had even abolished the office of adjutant general, so the only effective organization during this period was at the company level. Local militia units that existed were supported with private funds: local militia companies, such as the McCarthy Light Guards in Little Rock, participated in drill and ceremony competition; all their funding for travel, uniforms and equipment came from private sources. The McCarthy Light Guards organized in Little Rock in 1887 was named for John H. McCarthy, the local businessman who provided their uniforms. The unit competed in several drill competitions, including the Interstate Competitive Drill at Galveston, Texas, where the unit placed third, at Atlanta in 1889 where they placed second, in Omaha in 1891 where they took second, and at Nashville Tennessee where they took first place. The unit was invited to attend the World's Columbian Exposition in Chicago in 1893. The unit took fourth prize at the Interstate Competitive Drill conducted in its home town of Little Rock in 1894.

=== Reorganization of 1891 ===
In 1891, Captain E. D. Thomas, a captain of the 5th Cavalry was ordered to make an inspection of Arkansas State Guard on behalf of the Inspector General of the Army. Upon reaching Little Rock, Captain Thomas found that the only military organizations in existence at that time in the state were at the local level. Captain Thomas indicated that regimental and brigade level organizations had not been maintained for several years. Thomas indicated that the existing local companies were supported through benevolence and that the state had not even applied to utilize funds for the support of the militia which had recently been approved of by Congress. Captain Thomas' visit apparently spurred the state into action because he indicated that the following order had been issued prior to his departure from Little Rock:

Executive Office, Headquarters Arkansas State Guard,
Little Rock, October 5, 1901.
Order No. 14.

The First Regiment Arkansas State guard is hereby authorized, constituted, and organized, and will be composed of the following companies of the State guard troops, and will hereafter be known and designated as such in official reports and orders from these headquarters. Returns and reports from the different companies composing the same as the First Regiment Arkansas State guard, viz:

Company A, Capt. S. A. Horton, Fayetteville, Ark.;
Company B, Capt. G. N. Skelton, Fayetteville, Ark.;
Company C, Capt. John M. Dungan, Little Rock, Ark.;
Company D, Capt. John A. Mitchell, Little Rock, Ark.;
Company E, Capt. Ruff Boyett, Hope, Ark.;
Company F, Capt. Win. Nichol, Pine Bluff Ark.;
Company G, Capt. R. G. Grant., Fort Smith, Ark.;
Company II, Capt. J. H. Sarber, Clarksville, Ark.;
Company I, Capt. V. J. Stowers, Morrilton, Ark.;
Company K, "Stone's Company," Little Rock, Ark.

The companies will be permitted to retain, when operating independently, their local designation or name. The captains of the companies will report by letter to the colonel commanding the regiment of the exact condition of arms, amount of instruction, uniforms, and number of men available for active service and the average attendance at all the drills.

James P. Eagle,
Governor of Arkansas

The following regimental officers were appointed by Adjutant General Files:

- Col. John D. Waldron, Commander of the First Regiment Arkansas State Guard, effective 1 October 1891.
- Lieut. Col. John M. Dungan
- Maj. G. C. Schogg
- Capt. C. M. Wing appointed as the Regimental Adjutant
- Capt. Chas. E. Taylor appointed as the Regimental Quartermaster

Col. Waldron was ordered to take necessary steps to completely organize, and equip his regiment, making all necessary appointments of non-commissioned officers. He was authorized to make such visits and inspections as he deemed proper in the performance of his duty.

=== Reorganization of 1897 ===
In January 1897 Governor Daniel W. Jones took office and although the position of adjutant general had still not been re-authorized by the state legislature at this time, Jones appointed Brigadier General Arthur Neill as his private secretary and acting adjutant general. The new governor and adjutant general began a massive reorganization of the Arkansas State Guard; two additional regiments of infantry, another troop of cavalry, and another battery of artillery were added. The state was divided by the Arkansas River into two military districts. The 1st Regiment, Arkansas State Guards was assigned to the Southern District.

1st Regiment, Arkansas State Guards	Colonel F.B.T. Hollenberg,	Station
Company A		Not yet formed
Company B	CPT James Wood	Little Rock
Company C, (McCarthy Light Guards)	CPT C.M. Wright	Little Rock
Company D, (Fletcher Rifles)	CPT R.M. Pearson	Little Rock
Company E	CPT Grant White	Hope
Company F		Not yet formed
Company G		Not yet formed
Company H	CPT Edward Lucas	Star City
Company I		Not yet formed
Company J		Not yet formed
Company K		Not yet formed
Company L	CPT R.W. Reynolds	Lake Village

== Spanish–American War ==
On 25 April 1898, President William McKinley called upon the State to supply two infantry regiments for the Spanish–American War. As none of the regiments were in acceptable condition to deploy – only two companies were determined fit to be mustered into service intact – the decision was made to create two new infantry regiments from the available manpower. The 1st, 2nd, 3rd, and 4th Regiments of Infantry, Arkansas State Guard, were reorganized, redesignated and mustered into federal service between 14 and 25 May 1898 at Little Rock as the 1st and 2nd Arkansas Volunteer Infantry. Governor Jones intended that all sections of the State be represented as far as possible, so the two new Regiments were created from selected State Guard companies and from different sections of the state. Pursuant to the Governor's direction the 1st Arkansas Volunteer Infantry was organized as follows:

1st Arkansas Volunteer Infantry

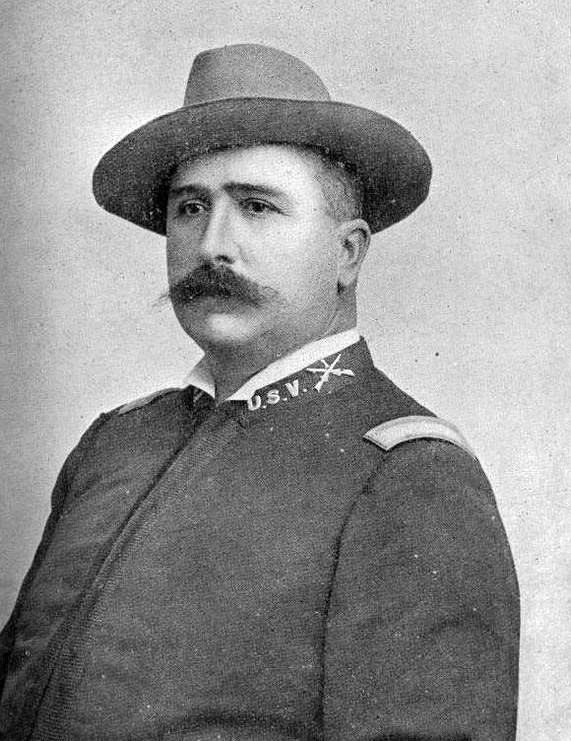
Col Elias Chandler, Commander, 1st Arkansas Volunteer Infantry

Company	Former Organization	Station
A	Company A, 3rd Regiment, Arkansas State Guard (ASG)	Hot Springs
B	Company, E, 3rd Regiment, ASG (Jefferson Fencibles)	Pine Bluff
C	Battery B, ASG	Fort Smith
D	Company D, 3rd Regiment, ASG	Fort Smith
E	Co E, 1st Regiment, ASG and Co G, 3rd Regiment, ASG	Hope (Co E) and Dequeen (CO G)
F	Company I, 4th Regiment, ASG	Springdale
G	Company B, 4th Regiment, ASG (Helena Light Guards)	Helena
H	New Unit Organized for the War	
I	Company A, 1st Regiment, ASG	Van Buren
K	Company I, 3rd Regiment, ASG	Paris
L	Company L, 1st Regiment, ASG, (Chicot Rifles)	Lake Village
M (Greene Rifles)	New Unit Organized for the War	

The newly formed 1st Arkansas Volunteer Infantry did not see combat during the Spanish–American War. The regiment, commanded by Colonel Elias Chandler, along with the 2nd Arkansas Volunteer Infantry was sent to Camp George H. Thomas at Chickamauga Park, Georgia in May 1898. The 1st Arkansas Volunteer Infantry was still there participating in basic training when the war effectively ended with the fall of Cuba and the signing of an armistice in early August. The 1st Arkansas Volunteer Infantry mustered out of Federal Service on 25 October 1899 at Little Rock, Arkansas.

== The State Guard becomes the National Guard ==
The Militia Act of 1903 (32 Stat. 775), also known as the Dick Act, organized the various state militias into the present National Guard system. The act was passed in response to the demonstrated weaknesses in the militia, and in the entire U.S. military in the Spanish–American War of 1898.

U.S. Senator Charles W. F. Dick, a Major General in the Ohio National Guard who chaired the Committee on the Militia, sponsored the 1903 Act towards the end of the 57th United States Congress. This legislation, passed 21 January 1903, gave federal status to the state militia, and required them to conform to Regular Army organization within five years. The act also required National Guard units to attend 24 drills and five days' annual training a year, and provided for pay for annual training for the first time. In return for the increased Federal funding which the act made available, militia units had to meet certain standards, and were subject to inspection by Regular Army officers.

In Arkansas, re-organization of the Arkansas State Guard actually began in 1901 under Governor Jeff Davis. Major General W.M. Maynes, in a biennial report dated 31 December 1906 provided an overview of the status of the Arkansas Militia. The Militia was subdivided by statute into the State Guard, or active organize militia, and the Reserve Militia. The State Guard, or regularly enlisted, organized and uniformed militia, was at a total strength of 1,274 personnel. The Federal Government appropriated $35,956.86 for the support of the Arkansas State Guard in that year and the Adjutant General applied to the General Assembly for appropriation of one half the Federal appropriation. Beginning with the passage of the "Dick" Act, the Arkansas State Guard was henceforth called the 'Arkansas National Guard'. The units retained their designations as the 1st Arkansas Infantry, 2nd Arkansas Infantry, etc., until the beginning of World War I, when all National Guard units were redesignated with federal numbers.

=== Geographic reorganization ===
For several years, the state had been organized with the 1st Infantry being stationed north of the Arkansas River and the 2nd Infantry stationed south of the river. But in 1909, the Adjutant General, General Green, determined that the disposition of new railroads and highways had made the existing stationing plan inefficient. He issued General Order No 35 which reorganized the regiments and battalions and changed the letter designations of some of the companies. The regiments were re-stationed so that the 1st Infantry was situated in the eastern part of the state, with its principle "concentration point" being Little Rock, and the 2nd Infantry was stationed in the western part of the state, concentrated around Fort Smith.

Regiment	Unit	Station	Officers	Enlisted
1st Regiment	Headquarters	Little Rock	15	5
	Company A	Prescott	3	78
	Company B	Beebe	3	58
	Company C	Hot Springs	3	41
	Company D	El Dorado	3	57
	Company E	Black Rock	3	56
	Company F	Jonesboro	3	64
	Company G	McCrory	2	61
	Company H	Heber Springs	3	42
	Company I	Helena	3	58
	Company K	Lonoke	3	71
	Company L	Piggott	3	61
	Company M	Blytheville	3	55
	1st Regiment Band	Little Rock		28

=== Increased training with new funding ===
With the new Federal funding in place State National Guard units were encouraged to participate in biennial encampments with the regular army. In 1906 Arkansas sent one provisional regiment to Fort Riley, Kansas for training. In 1908 a provisional regiment trained at Leon Springs, Texas. In 1910 Arkansas Troops were invited back to Leon Springs, Texas for a 12-day encampment and the federal government provided $25,000 to defray the costs of the encampment.

Companies A-D-F-H-I and M of the 1st Infantry participated in an encampment at Dardanelle, Arkansas from 9–18 August 1909. The units were trained by members of the 1st Battalion, 16th Infantry, U.S. Army.

== Mexican Border Campaign ==
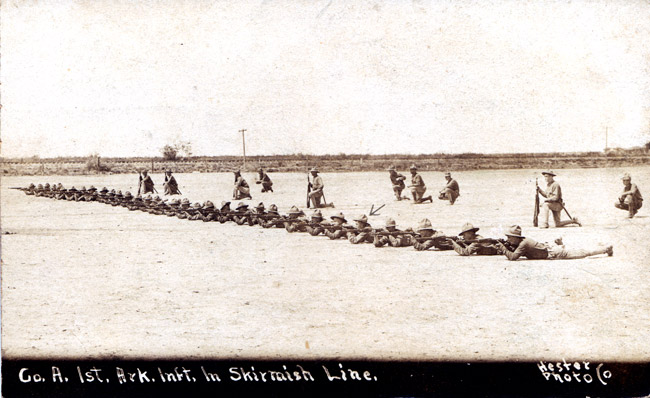
Company A, First Arkansas Infantry, on the skirmish line near Deming, New Mexico, during the 1916 Mexican Expedition

In July 1916, the entire Arkansas National Guard was mobilized for federal service on the Mexican border. The 1st and 2nd Infantry Regiments were stationed near Deming, New Mexico, as part of support troops for the 'Pancho Villa Expedition', led by General John J. Pershing. The 1st Arkansas did not engage in Mexico and returned to Little Rock in February, mustering out of service 19–24 February at Fort Logan H. Roots. This mobilization of the National Guard along the Mexican border was the training ground for many future leaders of the Arkansas National Guard – many of the officers who led Arkansas National Guard units in the early years of World War I and World War II began their service on the Mexican border.

== World War I ==
=== Status on eve of war ===
When the United States declared war on Germany 6 April 1917, less than two months had passed since the 1st Arkansas had completed mustering out from duty on the Mexican border. In March, 1917, the Arkansas National Guard had been in danger of having its federal recognition withdrawn due to poor enlistment levels. Company "E", 1st Arkansas Infantry, Little Rock Company, had only twenty men and were thirty-two men short – the businessmen of Little Rock were unenthusiastic, and employers would not let men off for training and would discourage their employees from joining.

=== Mobilization ===
While Congress was debating the declaration of war the 1st Regiment was mobilized 31 March 1917, and began reporting to Fort Roots in North Little Rock. With the increased speculation of the entry of the United States in the war in Europe, plans for mobilization were published. The War Department initially called the 1st Regiment of the Arkansas National Guard into federal service for the purpose of police protection. Meanwhile, Governor Charles H. Brough was planning to withhold $25,000 of the State's appropriation to the Arkansas National Guard, hoping that the federal government would bear the financial burden of the Arkansas National Guard.

The units of the 1st Arkansas were to proceed to Ft. Roots outside of Little Rock for mobilization when the companies had reached the minimum company strength of sixty-five men. The minimum strength was difficult to achieve because of new orders from the War Department mustering out guardsmen with families and those with previous orders. This released all men employed in government work. To counteract the men mustered out, companies were held at their home stations as long as possible to stimulate recruiting. National Guard officers understood that when a company left its home station the boys of the community lost interest in joining the Guard for fear that they would not be assigned to their local company. Recruiting for the Guard was greatly aided when Armour, one of the largest companies in Little Rock, gave the difference between salaries to its regular employees who had enlisted in the Arkansas National Guard before 31 March 1917, and were called into active service. Individuals also were exemplifying patriotism; one man upon learning the need of men for the National Guard, left his work in the fields and walked thirty miles to enlist.

By 4 April 1917, the 1st Arkansas Regiment was ready to move to Little Rock, and company commanders were ordered to report by wire the hour and date they expected to leave their home stations. New companies at Forrest City, Dewitt, Rison, and Fordyce were being organized with the idea of "beating Uncle Sam" and not being drafted. The 2nd Arkansas Regiment was on forty-eight-hour standby and had not received mobilization orders.

To equip the companies of the 1st Arkansas, U.S. Arsenals sent to Ft. Roots 2,000 rifles, 1,500 uniforms, 2,000 blankets, 1,000 cots, 2,000 pairs of shoes, and 100 pyramidal tents.

Policies were established to cope with men unable to pass physical examinations. It was determined that these men were to be mustered into Federal service, their status remaining the same as those men passing the physical examination. After being mustered into Federal service, the men who did not pass the physical examination were discharged and given free passage home. The 1st Arkansas Infantry had a discharge rate because of physical defects of only 12 per cent; when the 1st Arkansas Infantry was mobilized for duty on the Mexican border the discharge rate was 50 per cent.

The first military assignment of the Arkansas National Guard was to "find and destroy" a "spy" wireless station located somewhere in the Blue Mountains. This they found on the highest peak in the state, Mt. Magazine – a disused and forgotten radio station that had been used by the Government Geodetic Survey Corps. The second military campaign, concerning the right of the governor to order a detail of Arkansas National Guards to Bauzite, was fought on paper between Colonel James, Commanding Officer of the Arkansas National Guard, and Governor Brough. The need for troops at Bauxite was due to a German flag being flown by a grape grower. Colonel James refused to send troops on the grounds that he took his orders from General Pershing. The matter was settled when the flag disappeared.

The 1st Arkansas was assigned the duty of guarding the State Capital, which contained the arsenal of the Arkansas National Guard. Troops were placed in and around the building, and only persons authorized by the Secretary of State, T. J. Terral, could be admitted to the grounds. Company "B" (from Beebe) of the 1st Arkansas Regiment, the first company assigned guard duty, camped on the west side of the Capital. Four nights later the men from Company "B" could claim another first for their company when two guardsmen fired eight shots and frightened off an intruder.

Rumors that the 1st Arkansas would be assigned to levee and bridge guard duties throughout the state proved to be false when the men were put to work clearing land for a new campsite for the 1st Arkansas. When 7,000 Reserve Officer candidates were sent to Ft. Roots, the 1st Arkansas gave up their barracks for tents. The 1st Arkansas soldiers were given vaccinations against smallpox and typhoid fever, and then ordered to clear out brush and trees, work on post roads, and guard the camp.

On 18 May 1917, the Arkansas National Guard was notified that the Guard as a whole would be called into federal service on 5 August 1917. This announcement caused the 1st Arkansas to start military training. One-third of the men resumed drilling and training while the other men completed the construction on Ft. Root.

Outside of work at Ft. Root, however, the Arkansas soldiers were treated to dances and banquets by the citizens of Little Rock. The men of Company "B" of the 1st Arkansas solicited funds at the Capital and used the money to buy baseball suits and baseball materials. The men also enjoyed a "breezy" newspaper devoted to the interest of the Arkansas National Guard, named the Volunteer.

The Arkansas National Guard was initially informed that its units would be assigned to the Eighteenth Division, along with the states of Mississippi and Louisiana. The state was directed to raise one regiment of infantry, one regiment of field artillery, and one outpost of company signal corps. After hearing the news, the men of the Arkansas National Guard stepped up their training with intensified cross county hiking, drilling, and maneuvering.

By 16 July 1917, the 1st Arkansas included the following units:

Regiment	Unit	Station	Officers	Enlisted
1st Regiment	Company A	Heber Springs	3	166
	Company B	Beebe	3	149
	Company C	Arkadelphia	3	97
	Company D	El Dorado	2	70
	Company E	Little Rock	3	167
	Company F	Hope	2	120
	Company G	Jonesboro	3	99
	Company H	Marvill	2	98
	Company I	Warren	2	103
	Company K	Dermott	3	89
	Company L	Piggott	3	74
	Company M	Blytheville	3	196
	Headquarters Company	Little Rock	1	33
	Supply Company	Little Rock	2	53
	Machine Gun Company	Little Rock	3	53
	Medical Corps	Beebe	5	22

On 18 July 1917, the 1st Arkansas was assigned to Camp Beauregard (Alexandria, Louisiana), for training as the Eighteenth Division. By 24 July 1917, Company "B" from Beebe was the only unit of the 1st Arkansas National Guard having a full war quota of men after physical examination for Federal service. On 26 July 1917, the first guardsman was killed when James Voinche, Company I, 1st Arkansas Infantry, was killed by a streetcar in Little Rock.

By August, 1917, the 1st Arkansas had become proficient in firing rifles and had practiced bayoneting dummies; the machine gun company had their target practice at Pinnacle Mountain. The chaplain of the 1st Arkansas kept the regiment's history. Because Ft. Roots was designated a base hospital, the men of the 1st Arkansas were transferred from Ft. Roots to the adjacent Camp Pike, and were permitted to sleep in the barracks. The tents were packed by the men with hopes that they would not be unpacked until arrival in France.

The 1st Arkansas Regiment Band appeared in a War Department film in 1917. Little Rock also hosted the largest Southwest parade in over thirty years – the Eighty-seventh Division, Arkansas National Guard, National Army, and the Iowa Field Artillery participated. This was the last parade in the state of Arkansas for many members of the Arkansas National Guard.

=== Movement to Camp Beauregard ===
In late September, 1917, the Arkansas National Guard moved by train to Camp Beauregard in Alexandria, Louisiana. The trip took about fourteen hours.

=== Re-numbering and loss of state designations ===
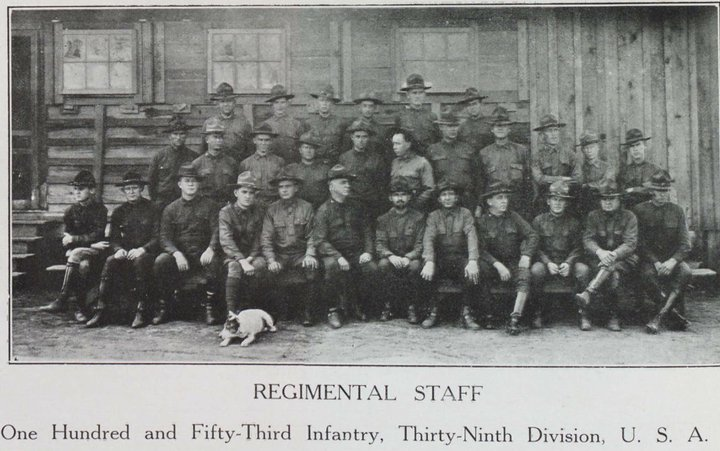
Regimental Staff, 153rd Infantry, at Camp Beauregard, Louisiana, 1918.

Upon reaching Camp Beauregard, all National Guard units were stripped of their state designations and re-numbered under a new federal system: The 18th Division was redesignated as the 39th Division. The 1st Arkansas Infantry Regiment became the 153rd Infantry Regiment,

The 39th "Delta" Division was composed of the:

- Seventy-seventh Infantry Brigade (153rd Infantry, 154th Infantry, and the 141st Machine Gun Battalion);
- Seventy-eighth Infantry Brigade (155th Infantry, 156th Infantry, 142nd Machine Gun Battalion);
- Sixty-fourth Field Artillery Brigade (140th Field Artillery, 141st Field Artillery, 142nd Field Artillery, and the 114th Trench Mortar Battery);
- the Divisional Troops (140th Machine Gun Battalion, 114th Engineers, 114th Field Signal Battalion and Headquarters Troop); and,
- Trains (114th Train Headquarters and Military Police, 114th Ammunition Train, 114th Supply Train, 114th Engineer Train, and the 114th Sanitary Train. The 39th Division was brought up to strength with the addition of soldiers from Ohio, Illinois and Kentucky.

An outbreak of measles in the later part of October 1917 kept the men from drilling. Regardless, in January, 1918, the National Guard Reserve was transferred to the active list. However, in the same month, Alexandria, Louisiana, was made off limits, and visits by other regiments were banned due to an outbreak of meningitis. During this time, the soldiers were instructed in the use of deadly gases and then exposed to tear gas. The curfew concerning Alexandria lasted until 6 March 1918. The soldiers complained about the bugs and were anxious to go to France. By March 1918, the soldiers had received new Enfield rifles. In early October, 1918, after the departure of most Arkansas soldiers, Camp Beauregard was struck by Spanish influenza which led into lobar pneumonia; all available facilities were used and hospitals became overcrowded.

The 1st Arkansas passed in review for the first time in February for Arkansas Adjutant-General England, and the entire 39th Division passed in review in April for the Governors of Mississippi and Louisiana.

=== Deployment to France ===
Due to a lack of replacements for units already in combat in Europe, enlisted soldiers of the 39th Division were offered the opportunity to volunteer to deploy early ahead of the rest of the division. This chance to volunteer for immediate combat was offered to approximately five thousand troops. In June, 1918, these volunteer enlisted personnel from the 153rd (old 1st Arkansas) and 154th (composed of part of the old 2nd and 3rd Arkansas) Infantry, began arriving in France. The movement consisted of only twenty per cent of each organization, and the officers did not accompany their troops but remained at Camp Beauregard with the other eighty per cent still in training.

The 39th Division, less its artillery units, left Camp Beauregard 1 August 1918 and sailed for overseas service 6 August 1918. The units of the 39th Division arrived in France between 12 August and 12 September 1918. They were then sent to the St. Florent area, southwest of Bourges, where it was designated as a replacement division. In November, 1918, it moved to St. Aignan. There, several of the units were transferred to combat divisions. The Division was never a front line division; therefore, it never advanced any miles, captured any prisoners nor received any replacements. The Division was designated as the Fifth Depot Division on 14 August 1918, and moved to Charost and Mehun-sur-Yeure Area southwest of Bourges. The units of the Division for the most part were training cadres whose duties were to receive, train, equip, and forward replacements of both officers and men for the infantry units, machine gun units, and for ammunition and supply trains. On 29 October 1918, orders directed that the Division be attached to the 1st Depot Division at St-Aignan-Noyers and Loir-et-Cher.

While the 153rd Infantry did not see combat as a regiment due to its use as replacements, several of its soldiers did participate in combat. In a letter home in August 1918, a guardsman from the old Company "I" of the 1st Arkansas National Guard, described the fighting and sent a coat lapel which he stated belonged to the "best soldier for the Crown Prince", a German soldier whom the Arkansan had apparently killed in combat. The Arkansas Guardsmen also stated that the German soldiers were best at running. About the same time letters were being received in Arkansas from soldiers of the old 1st and 3rd Arkansas National Guard Regiments.

=== Demobilization ===
Most former Arkansas guardsmen began returning to the United States during January and February 1919. The Division returned to the United States for demobilization during the period between 30 November 1918, and 1 May 1919. The Division demobilized the following month at Camp Beauregard, Louisiana. With the war ended, the 153rd Infantry landed in Hoboken, New Jersey, 27 February 1919, making the crossing aboard the USS President Grant.

== Between the World Wars ==
=== The 5th Arkansas ===
As it became clear that the Arkansas National Guard units mobilized for World War I would not simply revert to state control but were, in fact, being disbanded upon demobilization, the state petitioned the War Department to be allowed to establish several new units: Arkansas was initially authorized to form the Fifth Regiment, Arkansas Infantry.

A proclamation was issued by the Governor on 7 November 1919, calling upon every county and city to co-operation in the organizing of at least one National Guard Company in each county. A campaign was launched in January 1920 by bringing the Regimental Commander, Colonel Ebenezer L. Compere, and a group of officers and enlisted soldiers who toured through sixty four of the state's largest cities to raise awareness and support of the National Guard.

As a result of this campaign, the following units were authorized to expand the new 5th Arkansas Infantry:

- Machine Gun Company, Fifth Arkansas Infantry, stationed at Pine Bluff, was given Federal Recognition on 31 July 1920.
- Supply Company, 5th Infantry was authorized to be formed at Fort Smith.
- A Band Section under the Headquarters of the 5th Infantry was authorized at Pine Bluff.
- Company A, 5th Arkansas Infantry was organized at Hope.

Infantry companies were also authorized at the following cities.

- Arkadelphia,
- Batesville,
- Beebe, with a detached platoon at McRea,
- Blue Mountain, with a detached Platoon at Plaineview
- Blytheville
- Booneville, with a detached platoon at Magazine
- Camden
- Earle
- Eureka Springs
- Heber Springs
- Magnolia
- Marianna
- Helena
- Marshall
- Prescott
- Rison
- Russellville
- Texarkana,
- Warren,

=== Re-Constitution of 153rd Infantry Regiment ===
By 1921 the state had been authorized to reconstitute its war time units. The 5th Arkansas Infantry was reorganized as the 153rd Infantry and the 141st Machine Gun battalion. The 153rd Infantry was stationed as follows:

Headquarters	Company	Station	Federal Recognition
153 Infantry Regiment	HHC, 153rd IN	Russellville	28 January 1926
	Service Company	Searcy, Arkansas	2 July 1924
	Band Section, Svc Company	Conway, Arkansas	13 November 1923
	Howitzer Company	Mena, Arkansas	25 October 1921
	Medical Detachment	Prescott, Arkansas	12 January 1923
1st Battalion, 153 Infantry Regiment	Headquarters, 1–153rd In	Hope, Arkansas	25 October 1921
	Headquarters Company, 1–153rd IN	Ashdown, Arkansas	14 December 1923
	Company A, 1–153 IN	Hope, Arkansas	30 December 1920
	Company B, 1–153 IN	Magnolia, Arkansas	29 March 1921
	Company C, 1–153 IN	Prescott, Arkansas	21 February 1921
	Company D, 1–153 IN	Pine Bluff, Arkansas	31 July 1920
2nd Battalion, 153 Infantry Regiment	Headquarters	Little Rock, Arkansas	25 June 1921
	Headquarters Company, 2–153 IN	Conway, Arkansas	27 January 1926
	Company E, 2–153 IN	Clarksville, Arkansas	25 February 1921
	Company F, 2–153 IN	Dardanelle, Arkansas	28 April 1923
	Company G, 2–153 IN	Conway, Arkansas	21 April 1921
	Company H, 2–153 IN	Forrest City, Arkansas	25 May 1921
3rd Battalion, 153 Infantry Regiment	Headquarters, 3–153 IN	Cotten Plant, Arkansas	1 July 1921
	Headquarters Company, 3–153 IN	Beebe, Arkansas	25 June 1921
	Company I, 3–153 IN	Cotton Plant, Arkansas	15 March 1921
	Company K, 3–153 IN	Lonoke, Arkansas	23 June 1923
	Company L, 3–153 IN	Batesville, Arkansas	2 October 1924
	Company M, 3–153 IN Command	Blytheville, Arkansas	8 May 1921

=== Organization in 1926 ===
The follow unit locations were reported in the Arkansas Adjutant General's Report for 1926.

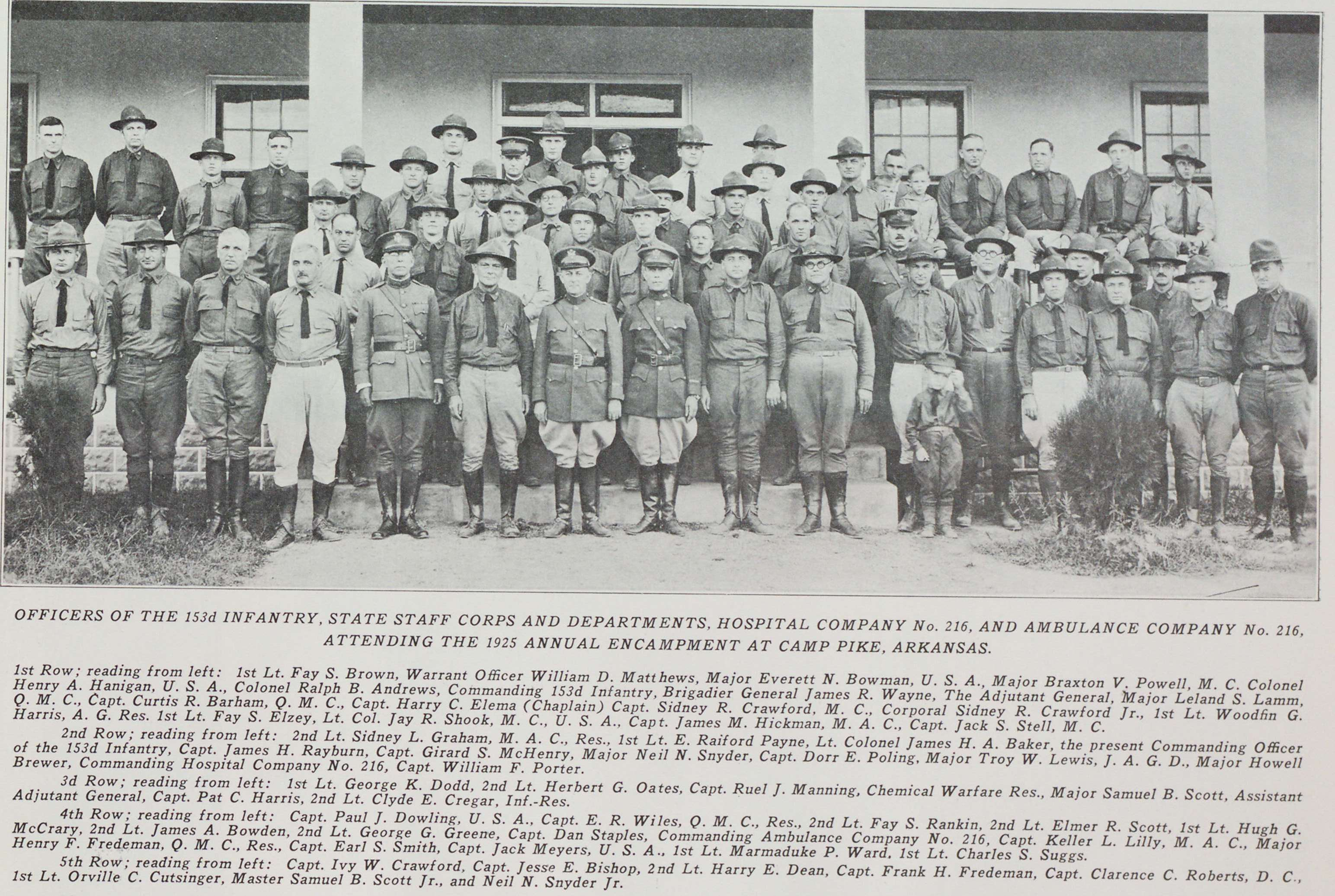
Officers of the 153rd Infantry, during Annual Training, 1925

Headquarters	Company	Station
153 Infantry Regiment	HHC, 153rd IN	Russellville
	Service Company	Searcy
	Band Section, Svc Company	Conway
	Howitzer Company	Mena
	Medical Detachment	Prescott
1st Battalion, 153 Infantry Regiment	Headquarters, 1–153rd In	Hope
	Headquarters Company, 1–153rd IN	Ashdown
	Company A, 1–153 IN	Hope
	Company B, 1–153 IN	Magnolia
	Company C, 1–153 IN	Prescott
	Company D, 1–153 IN	Pine Bluff
2nd Battalion, 153 Infantry Regiment	Headquarters	Little Rock
	Headquarters Company, 2–153 IN	Conway
	Company E, 2–153 IN	Clarksville
	Company F, 2–153 IN	Dardanelle
	Company G, 2–153 IN	Conway
	Company H, 2–153 IN	Forrest City
3rd Battalion, 153 Infantry Regiment	Headquarters, 3–153 IN	Cotten Plant
	Headquarters Company, 3–153 IN	Beebe
	Company I, 3–153 IN	Cotton Plant
	Company K, 3–153 IN	Lonoke
	Company L, 3–153 IN	Batesville
	Company M, 3–153 IN Command	Blytheville

== World War II ==
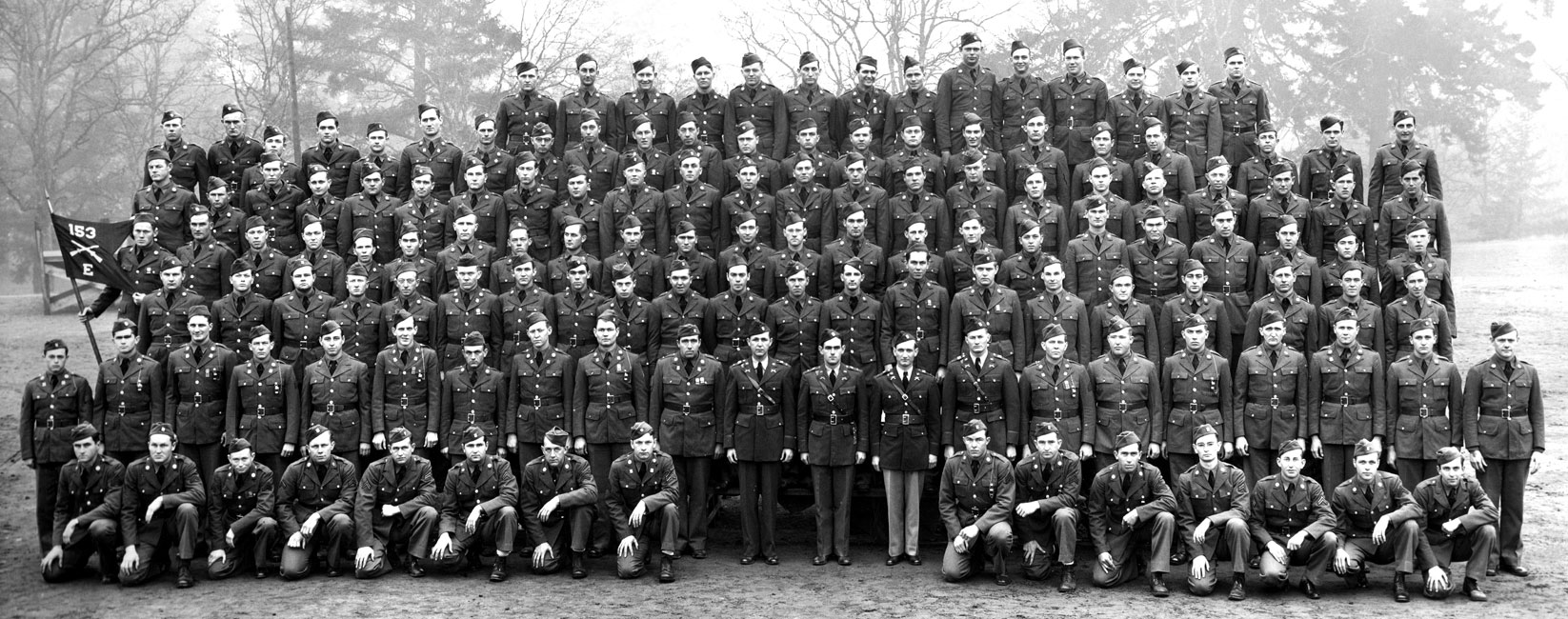
Company E, 153rd Infantry, Arkansas National Guard after they were mobilized, but before they were sent to Washington state and then the Aleutian Islands. This photograph was likely taken at Camp Forrest, Tennessee, in early 1941.

Headquarters of Companies E and F, 2nd Battalion, 153rd Infantry, Arkansas Army National Guard, on Umnak Island, in the Aleutian Islands, Alaska, 1942.

The 153rd Infantry Regiment was ordered to active duty 23 December 1940, as a part of a one-year mobilization of the National Guard in preparation for World War II and spent the next 10 days at what is now the University of Central Arkansas. The 153rd then moved to Camp Robinson and completed basic training. Moving to Camp Forrest, Tenn., the regiment spent six-week in maneuvers and returned to Camp Robinson for a few days of leave before shipping out to Camp Murray, Wash., on 20 August 1941.

The 153rd, along with the 206th Coast Artillery Regiment arrived in Alaska in August 1941. The 1st and 3rd Battalions were posted to Annette Island and Seward, Nome and Yakutat, Alaska. The 2nd Battalion was stationed on Umnak Island, west of Dutch Harbor and took part in the occupation of Adak Island and the assault on Kiska. 15 August 1943, part of the Aleutian Islands Campaign. The Japanese had secretly abandoned Kiska only days before the invasion by U.S. forces. The recapture of Kiska brought the Aleutian Islands campaign to a close.

The 153rd returned to Camp Shelby, Miss., on 21 March 1944 and was deactivated on 30 June 1944; its soldiers assigned to other units as replacements. Many returned to Camp Robinson as cadre.

== The Cold War ==
The 153rd Infantry was reconstituted on 30 September 1946 as an element of the 39th Infantry Division. It was composed of units from Arkansas and Louisiana, with its headquarters stationed at New Orleans, Louisiana and the Arkansas portion headquartered in Little Rock Arkansas.

=== 153rd Infantry Regiment Post WWII Stationing, 1946 ===
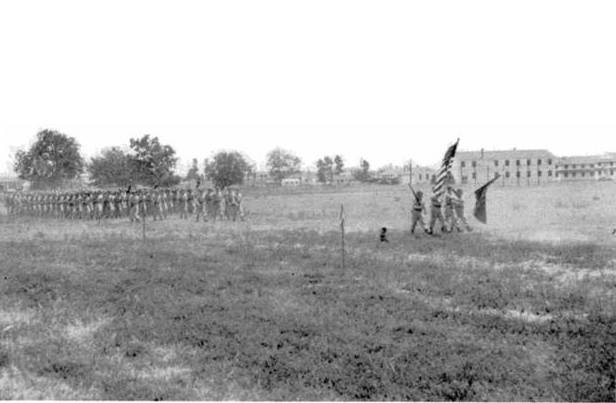
153rd Infantry on Parade at Fort Chaffee, 1950

Headquarters	Company	Station
153 Infantry Regiment	HHC, 153rd IN	Little Rock, Arkansas
	Service Company	Searcy, Arkansas
	Tank Company	Pine Bluff, Arkansas
	Heavy Mortar Company	DeQueen, Arkansas
	Medical Company	Little Rock, Arkansas
1st Battalion, 153 Infantry Regiment	Headquarters and Headquarters Company, 1–153rd IN	Texarkana, Arkansas
	Company A, 1–153 IN	Hope, Arkansas
	Company B, 1–153 IN	Malvern, Arkansas
	Company C, 1–153 IN	Prescott, Arkansas
	Company D, 1–153 IN	Arkadelphia, Arkansas
2nd Battalion, 153 Infantry Regiment	Headquarters and Headquarters Company, 2–153 IN	Morrilton, Arkansas
	Company E, 2–153 IN	Clarksville, Arkansas
	Company F, 2–153 IN	Dardanelle, Arkansas
	Company G, 2–153 IN	Conway, Arkansas
	Company H, 2–153 IN	Russellville, Arkansas
3rd Battalion, 153 Infantry Regiment	Headquarters and Headquarters Company, 3–153 IN	Beebe, Arkansas
	Company I, 3–153 IN	Jonesboro, Arkansas
	Company K, 3–153 IN	Walnut Ridge, Arkansas
	Company L, 3–153 IN	Batesville, Arkansas
	Company M, 3–153 IN Command	Blytheville

=== Task Force 153rd and Little Rock Central High School integration ===
The United States Supreme Court ruled 17 May 1954 that racial segregation in a public school is unconstitutional.

After a series of legal proceedings the Federal District Court ordered the Little Rock School District to proceed with its integration plans when school opened 3 September 1957. Governor Orval Faubus ordered the Arkansas National Guard to Little Rock Central High School 2 September 1957 because he had evidence "that there is imminent danger of tumult, riot and breach of peace and the doing of violence to persons and property". The Governor initially ordered to state duty the State Headquarters Detachment, the Base Detachment at Adams Field and any other units the Adjutant General felt necessary to "accomplish the mission of maintaining or restoring law and order and to preserve the peace, health, safety and security of the citizens of Pulaski County, Arkansas."

Major General Sherman T. Clinger, the Adjutant General of Arkansas, assembled a force of 289 soldiers under command of LTC Marion Johnson. On 4 September 1957 LTC Johnson told nine black students who were attempting to enter Central High School to return home. The National Guard presence gradually decreased to a 15-man day and night shift. The National Guard was replaced by the Little Rock City Police Friday, 20 September 1957.

On Monday, 23 September 1957 eight black students entered Central High. When word spread that the students were inside a crowd of approximately 1,000 gathered outside the school. There was a concern that the police would not be able to handle the crowd, but tensions eased when the black students were removed from Central. A force of 150 Guardsmen had been assembled and placed on five-minute notice to assist the police at Central, but they were not called on.

President Dwight D. Eisenhower federalized the entire Arkansas National Guard on 24 September, and unit members began assembling at home stations throughout the night. On the 24th elements of the 101st Airborne Division began arriving at Little Rock and took up positions around Central High. That same day the Adjutant General met with the commander of the Arkansas Military District and was ordered to assemble a force at Camp Robinson for duty at Central High. Those units were:

1st Battalion, 153rd Infantry Regiment
3rd Battalion, 153rd Infantry Regiment
39th Military Police Company and
Company D, 212th Signal Battalion

This force, consisting of 107 officers, 15 warrant officers and 1184 enlisted men, closed on Camp Robinson just after noon on the 25th. The National Guard soldiers were told, "Our mission is to enforce the orders of the Federal Courts with respect to the attendance at the public schools of Little Rock of all those who are properly enrolled, and to maintain law and order while doing so...Our individual feelings towards those court orders should have no influence on our execution of the mission." Said one Arkansas Guard major, "We have been ordered to maintain the peace and that is what we intend to do." The remainder of Arkansas National Guard units remained at home station and conducted training.

Beginning with night patrols on the 25th the Arkansas units worked with the 101st, gradually taking over more of the responsibility. By the 30th the Arkansas National Guard had full responsibility for escorting the black students to and from Central High and for providing them protection while inside the school. The majority of the Arkansas National Guard was released from active duty 1 October 1957. The initial force of 1200 assembled at Camp Robinson for duty at Central High School was gradually reduced to 435 officers and men. 1st Battalion, 153rd Infantry Regiment (referred to as Task Force 153rd Infantry in the situational reports to President Eisenhower) performed this duty.

From December 1957 through May 1958, Task Force 153rd Infantry maintained one Platoon at Central High School, one Platoon on thirty-minute recall at Camp Robinson, one Company on one hour recall, and the remainder of the battalion remained on duty at Camp Robinson. Members of the unit were involved in breaking up assaults on members of the Little Rock Nine by white students and responding to bomb threats against the school as late as February 1958. On 8 May 1958, the last three Arkansas National Guard soldiers withdrew from Central High School.

The 153rd Infantry's actions in the face of intense national scrutiny were applauded by people on both sides of the Central High School Integration Crisis. Harry Ashmore, editor of the Arkansas Gazette newspaper, who won the Pulitzer Prize for Editorial Writing, "For the forcefulness, dispassionate analysis and clarity of his editorials on the school integration conflict in Little Rock," said that no one, whatever his beliefs on school integration, could feel anything but admiration for the way the Arkansas Guardsmen went calmly about their duties, steering clear of partisan pressure. Little Rock School Superintendent Virgil Blossom said, "I have nothing but praise for the Guardsmen and the manner in which they performed a trying job under difficult circumstances."

=== Reorganization of 1959, the Pentomic Division ===
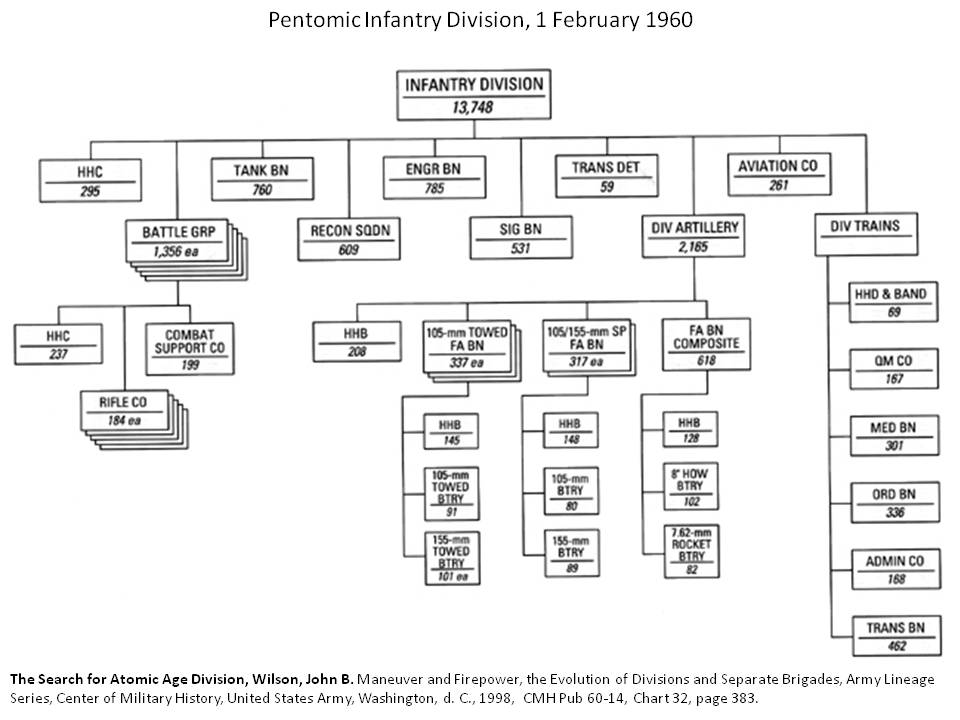
Organizational chart as of 1960

In 1959, the 39th Division was reorganized, along with all other National Guard divisions, in accordance with the new Pentomic Division Concept. This concept attempted to provide a new divisional structure to fight on the atomic battlefield.

==== Regiments no longer tactical units ====
The reorganization resulted in the end of the regiment as a tactical unit in the United States Army. Traditionally, regiments were the basic branch element, especially for the infantry, and their long histories had produced deep traditions considered essential to unit esprit de corps. The new divisional structure, replacing infantry regiments with anonymous battle groups, threatened to destroy all of these traditions. Secretary of the Army Wilber M. Brucker settled the question on 24 January 1957 when he approved the Combat Arms Regimental System. Although regiments (armored cavalry notwithstanding) would no longer exist as tactical units, certain distinguished regiments were to become "parent" organizations for the combat arms. Under the new concept, the Department of the Army assumed control of regimental headquarters – the repository for a unit's lineage, honors, and traditions – and used elements of the regiments to organize battle groups, battalions, squadrons, companies, batteries, and troops, which shared in the history and honors of their parent units. In place of the regiment or brigade, the new Pentomic Infantry Division fielded five "Battle Groups", each containing 1,356 soldiers. The 153rd Infantry was reorganized 1 June 1959 as a parent regiment under the Combat Arms Regimental System, to consist of the 1st, and 2nd, Battle Groups, elements of the 39th Infantry Division.

=== Reorganization of 1963 ===
By 1963 the Army again changed the basic design for an Infantry Division. The Battle Groups of the Pentomic Division had proved to be unwieldy, and it was felt that their span of control was not sufficient to handle all of the various units and troops assigned to their command. The army reverted to the infantry battalion as the basic building block and provided for additional command and control by providing a brigade headquarters. The 1st and 2nd Brigades, 39th Division were allocated to the Louisiana National Guard, while the 3rd Brigade was allocated to the Arkansas National Guard. The 153rd Infantry was reorganized to consist of the 1st, 2nd, and 3rd Battalions. For information on the 153rd Infantry Regiment after 1963, please see 39th Infantry Brigade Combat Team (United States) or the individual battalion histories. 1st Battalion, 153rd Infantry Regiment; 2nd Battalion, 153rd Infantry Regiment; and 3rd Battalion, 153rd Infantry Regiment.

=== 39th Division reorganized as 39th Infantry Brigade (Separate) ===
On 1 December 1967, the 39th Division was reorganized and redesignated as the 39th Infantry Brigade. The 153rd Infantry Regiment was represented in the new 39th Infantry Brigade (Separate) by the 1st, 2nd and 3rd Battalions, 153rd Infantry. The 3rd Battalion, 153rd Infantry was inactivated in 2005. The current active units of the 153rd Infantry Regiment are the 1st and 2nd Battalions.

== Campaign participation credit ==
=== World War I ===
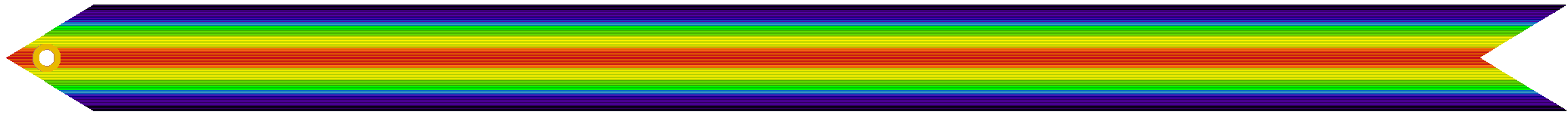
- Streamer without inscription

=== World War II ===
- Aleutian Islands

=== War on terrorism ===
- Transition of Iraq
- Iraqi Governance
- Iraqi Surge

== Past commanders ==
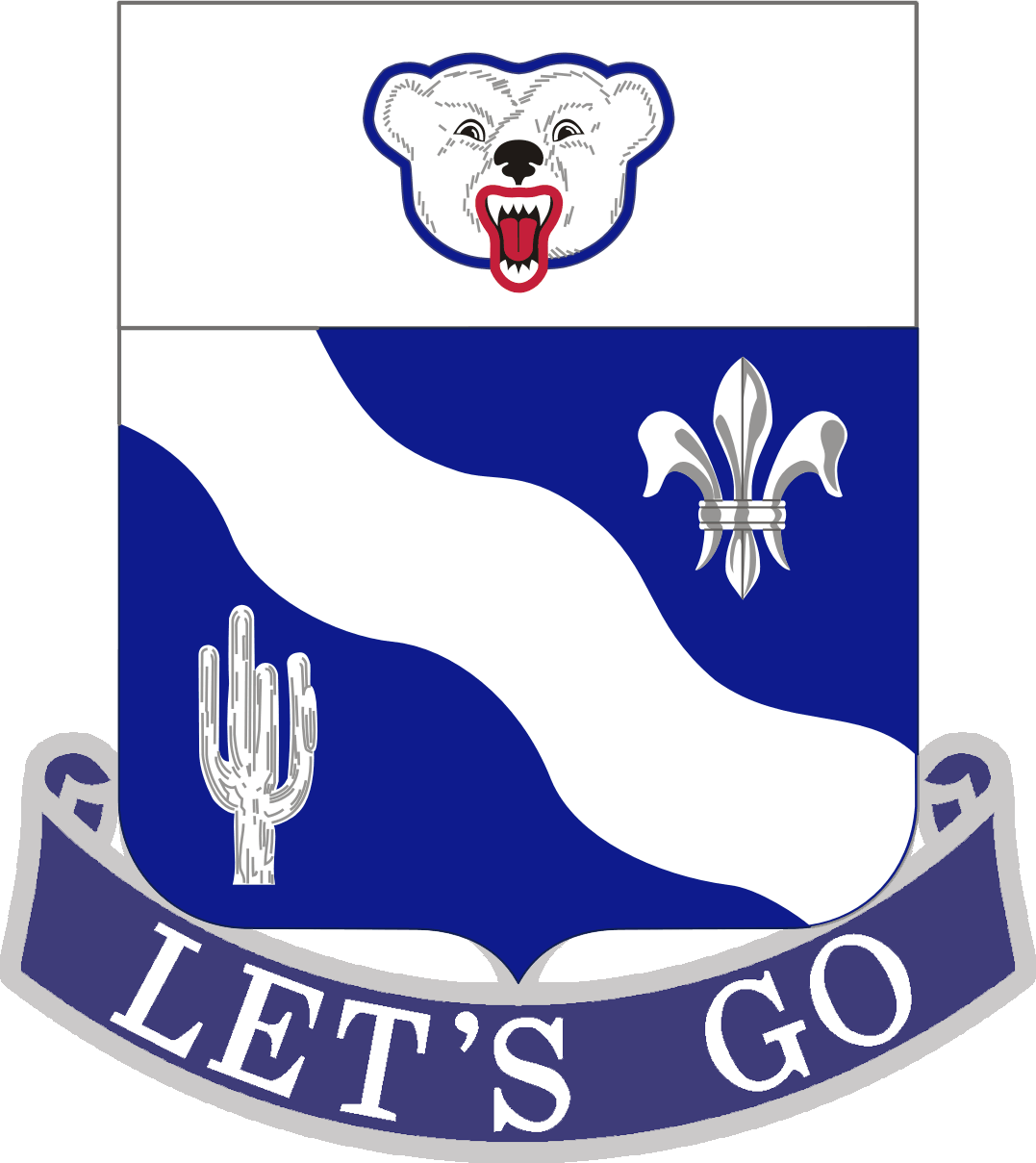
COL John D. Waldron, 1892

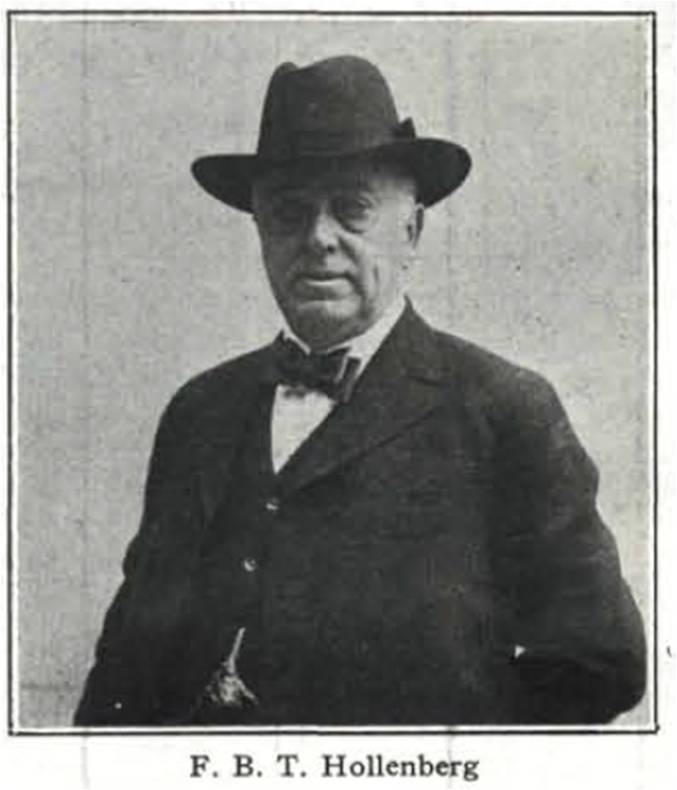
COL F.B.T. Hollenberg, 1897

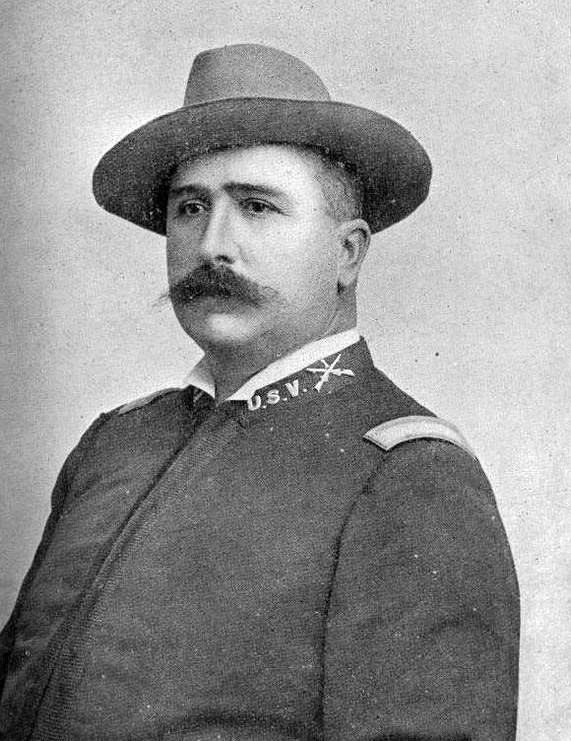
COL Elias Chandler 1897–1898

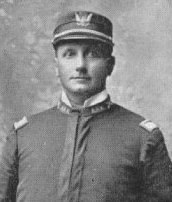
Colonel M. M. Stuckey, 1902

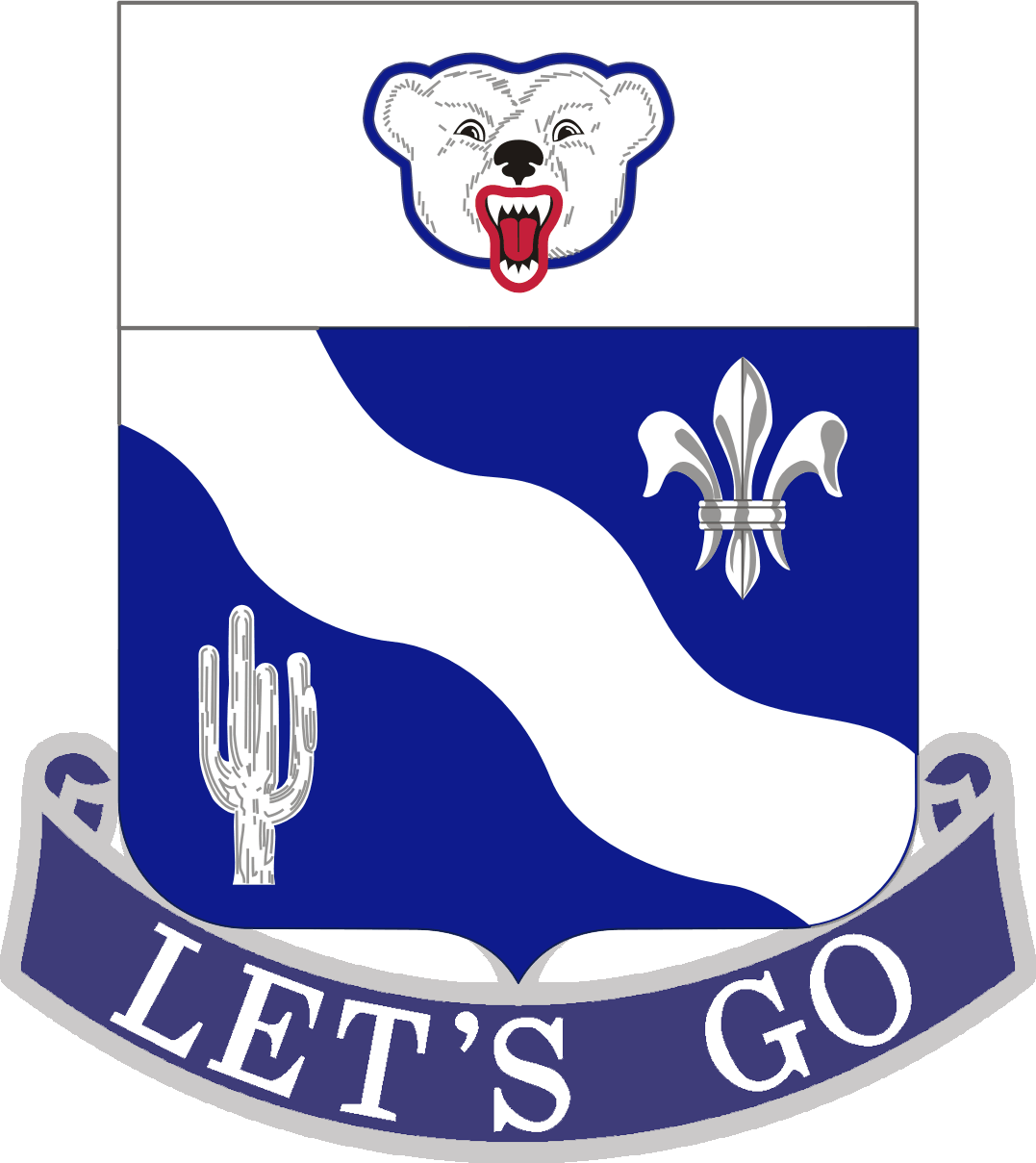
John L. Hornor, 1902

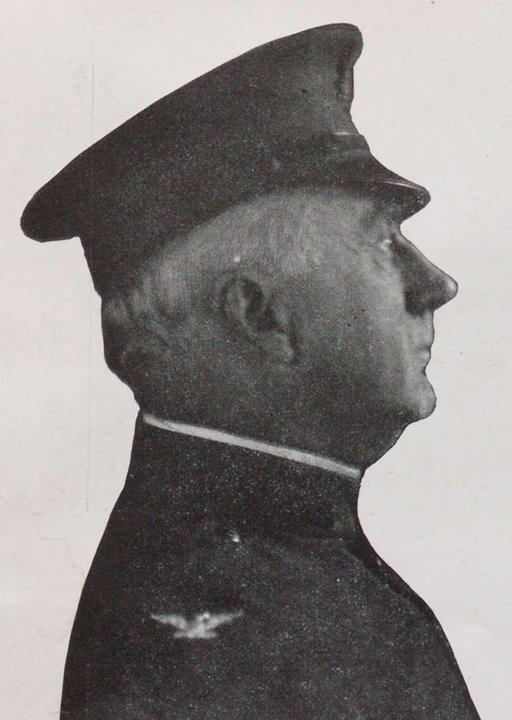
COL Charles Dexter James, 1914–1919

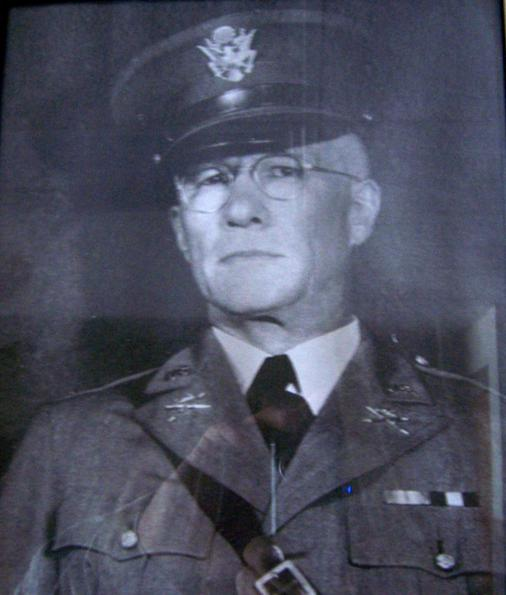
COL Ebenezer L. Compere, 1920–1921, commanded the 5th Arkansas following WWI

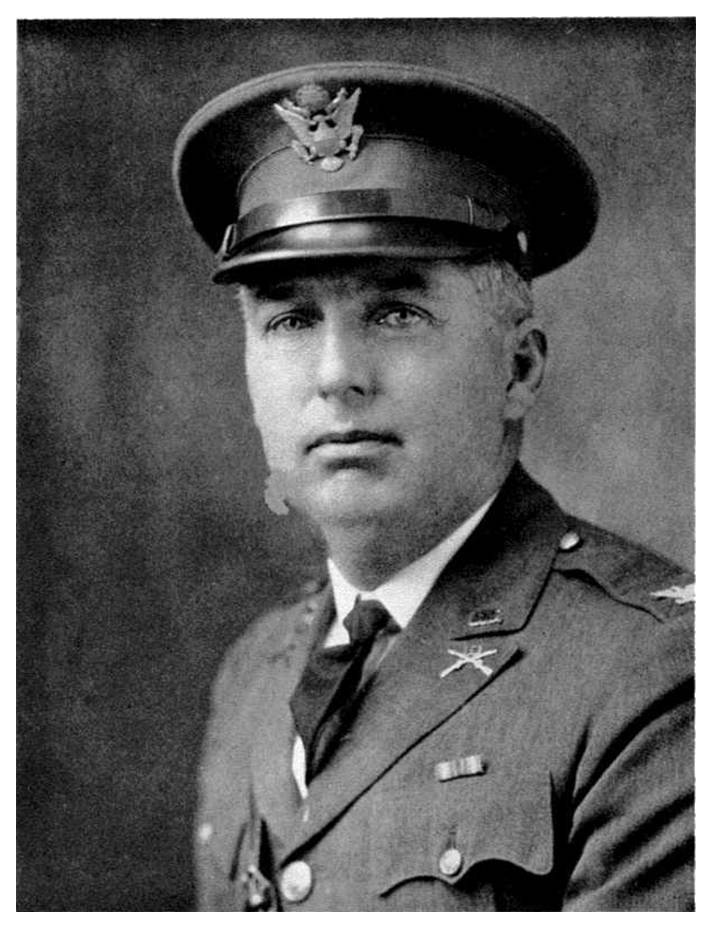
COL Heber L. McAlister, 1922

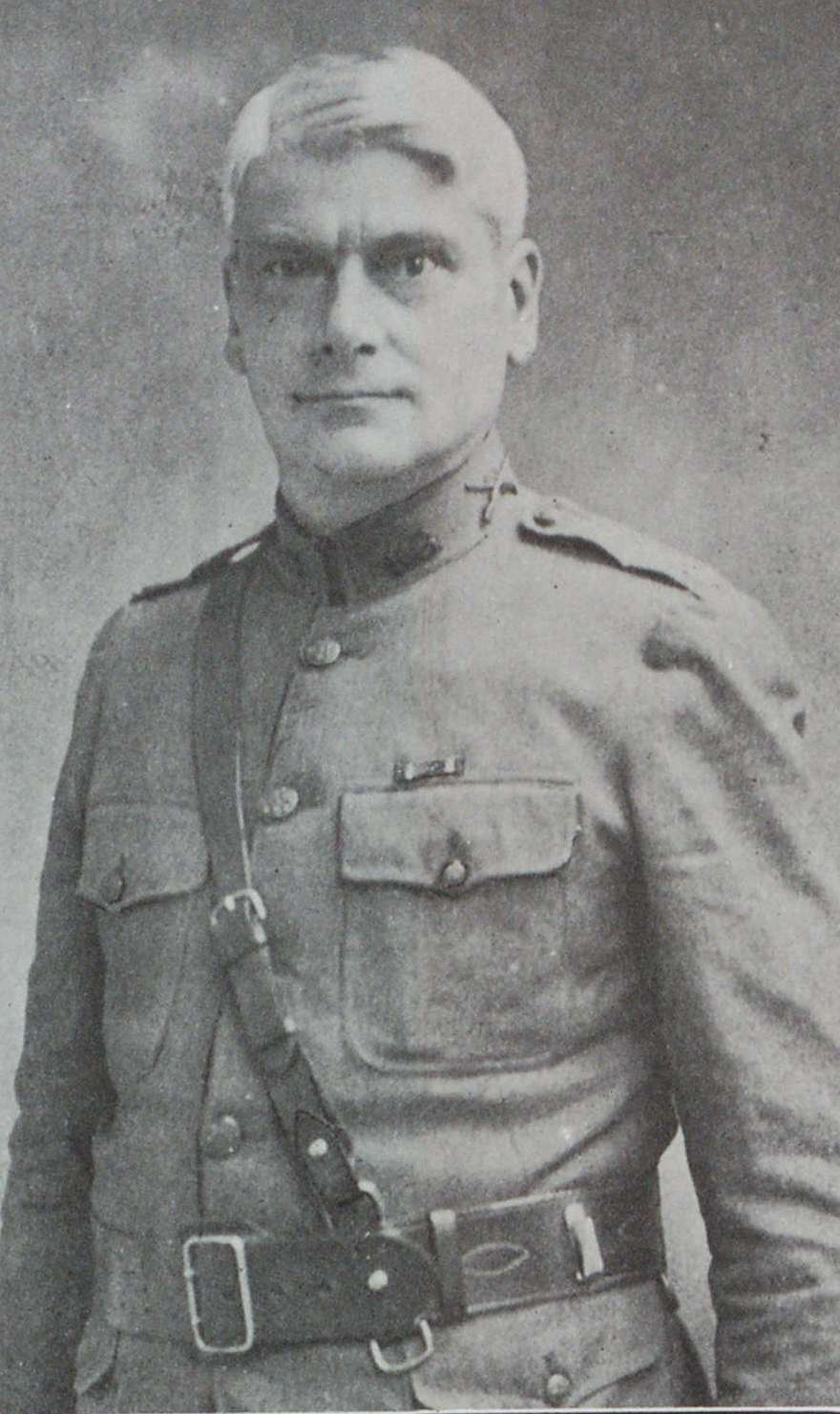
COL Ralph B Andrews, 1924

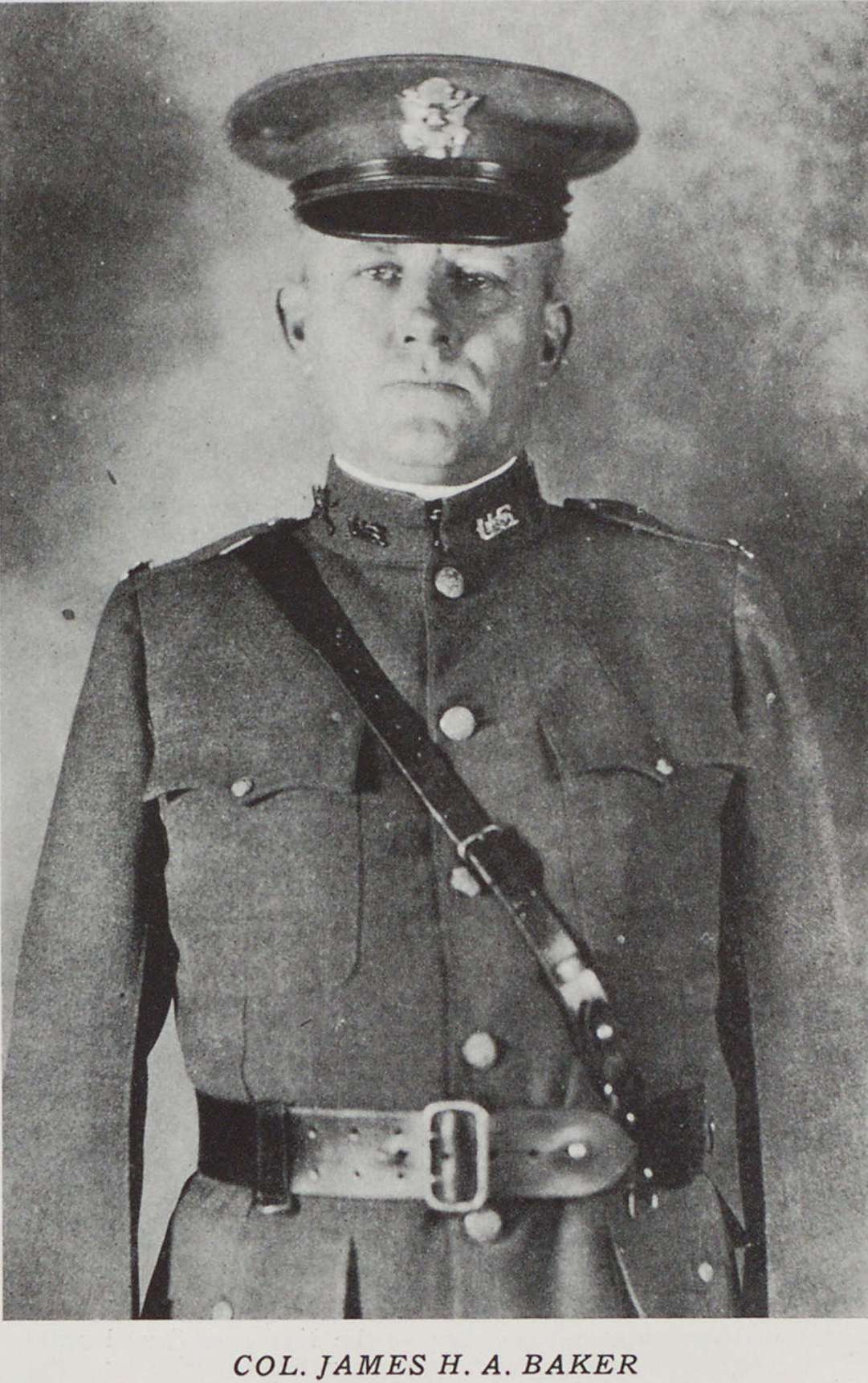
COL James H A Baker, 1925–1928

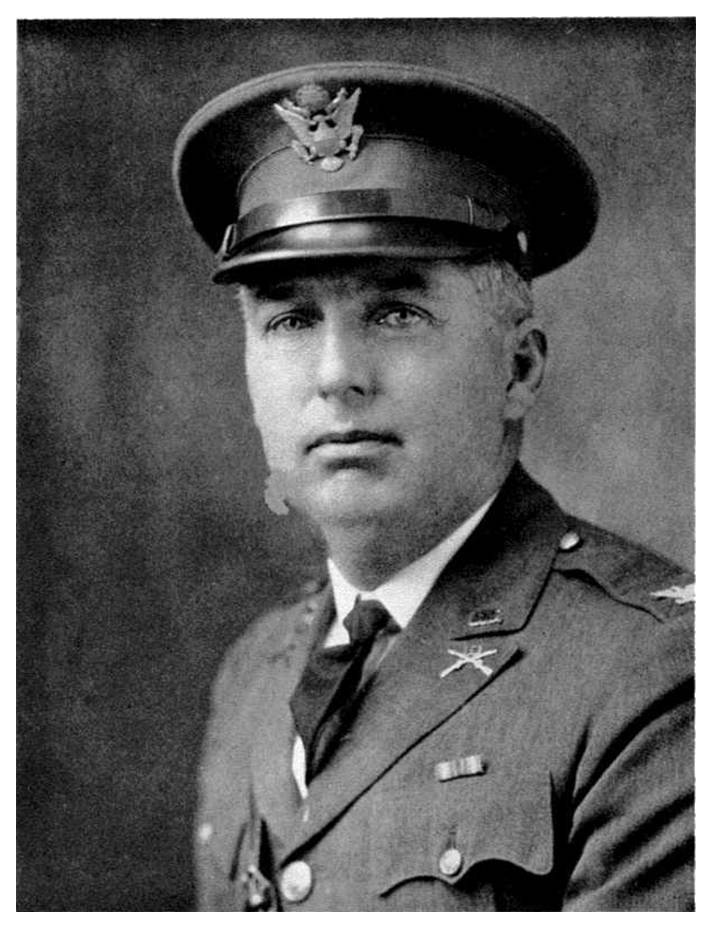
COL Heber L. McAlister, 1928–1944

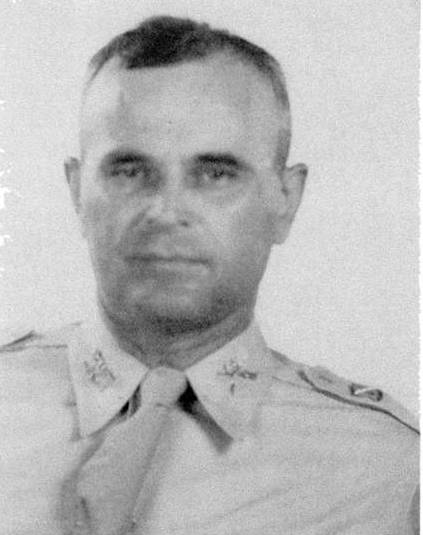
COL Lucien Abraham, 1947–1952

== Heraldry ==
Background: The distinctive unit insignia and coat of arms were originally approved for the 153rd Regiment Infantry on 6 January 1930. The Great Bear's Face was added on 4 June 1951 to represent the unit's service in Alaska during World War II. The DUI had also been amended on 30 June 1930.

=== Distinctive unit insignia ===
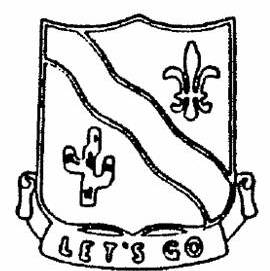
Distinctive unit insignia of the 153rd Infantry as approved by the Center of Military History, 30 June 1930. The DUI was amended in 1951 to add the Great Bear's Face to represent the unit's service in Alaska during World War II

A silver-color metal and enamel device 1 1/8 inches (29 mm) in height overall consisting of a shield blazoned: Azure, a bend wavy between a fleur-de-lis and a giant cactus Argent; on a chief of the last a Great Bear's face of the like fimbriated of the first, lips and tongue Gules. Attached below the shield is a blue motto scroll inscribed "LET'S GO" in silver letters.

Symbolism: The shield is blue for Infantry. The wavy bend, representing the Arkansas River, refers to the geographic location of the regiment. The cactus symbolizes service on the Mexican border and the fleur-de-lis service in France during World War I. The Great Bear's face from the shoulder sleeve insignia of the Alaskan Department symbolizes service in that area in World War II.

=== Coat of arms ===
Blazon: Shield: Azure, a bend wavy between a fleur-de-lis and a giant cactus Argent; on a chief of the last a Great Bear's face of the like fimbriated of the first, lips and tongue Gules.

Crest: That for the regiments of the Arkansas National Guard: On a wreath of the colors (Argent and Azure) above two sprays of apple blossoms Proper a diamond Argent charged with four mullets Azure, one in upper point and three in lower, within a bordure of the last bearing twenty-five mullets of the second.

Symbolism: The shield is blue for Infantry. The wavy bend, representing the Arkansas River, refers to the geographic location of the regiment. The cactus symbolizes service on the Mexican border and the fleur-de-lis service in France during World War I. The Great Bear's face from the shoulder sleeve insignia of the Alaskan Department symbolizes service in that area in World War II.

== Bibliography ==
- Goldstein, Donald M.; Dillon, Katherine V. (1992). The Williwaw War: the Arkansas National Guard in the Aleutians in World War II. Fayetteville: University of Arkansas Press.
- United States. Dept. of the Army and Air Force. National Guard Bureau (2001), Request for Lineage and Honors Update (153d Infantry), Johnson, Capt. Todd Alex, Comp., Washington: NGB.
