= James W. Kelly =

Rear admiral in US Navy

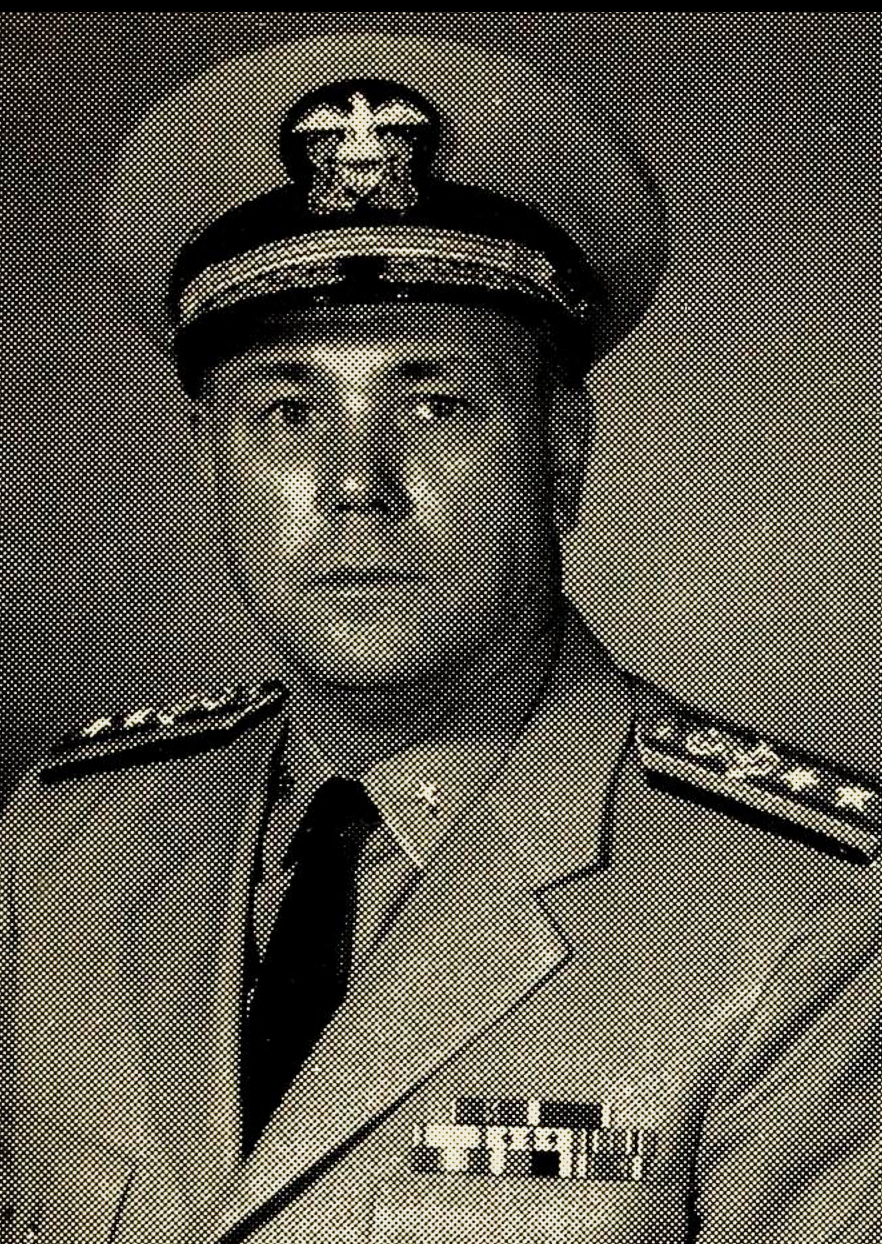
- Born: December 24, 1913; Carthage, Arkansas, U.S.
- Died: April 16, 1989 (aged 75); Lexington, Virginia, U.S.
- Military career
- Allegiance: United States
- Branch: United States Navy
- Rank: Rear admiral
- Commands: Chief of Chaplains of the United States Navy
- Awards: Distinguished Service Medal

James Woodrow Kelly (December 24, 1913 – April 16, 1989) was a rear admiral in the United States Navy. He was Chief of Chaplains of the United States Navy from July 1965 to July 1970. He is an alumnus of Ouachita Baptist University and Southern Baptist Theological Seminary.

== Early life and education ==
Kelly was born in Carthage, Arkansas in 1913. He earned a B.A. degree from Ouachita Baptist University in 1936 and a Th.M. degree from the Southern Baptist Theological Seminary in 1940. Kelly served as a pastor in Malvern, Arkansas from 1940 to 1942.

== Military career ==
Kelly was commissioned in the United States Naval Reserve on March 26, 1942. He served aboard USS Mobile in 1944 and USS Alaska in 1946. Kelly was promoted to captain on November 1, 1956, and then to rear admiral on July 1, 1963. He was conferred an honorary D.Div. degree by Ouachita Baptist University in 1957 and an honorary LL.D. degree by the Atlanta Law School in 1969. Kelly was awarded the Navy Distinguished Service Medal at the time of his retirement in 1970.
