= Thomas Lee Ballenger =

Thomas Lee Ballenger (December 22, 1882 — November 8, 1987) was a historian, author and teacher. He was born in Rover, Arkansas on December 22, 1882. Ballenger received a Bachelor of Arts degree from Ouachita Baptist College in 1905 and began teaching in Mountain Home, Arkansas. He quickly transitioned from teaching to school administration in Loco, Oklahoma and Magnum, Oklahoma. After this time, Ballenger attended the University of Chicago to earn a second BA, and where he would eventually also earn a master's degree in History. In 1918, he married Mildred Josephine Parks, a member of the Cherokee Nation, with whom he had one son, Tom Jr. Due in part to his marriage to Parks, Ballenger focused his further studies in Cherokee history while receiving his doctorate from the University of Oklahoma. Ballenger died at age 104, on November 8, 1987.
