= Lucien Abraham =

American college football coach

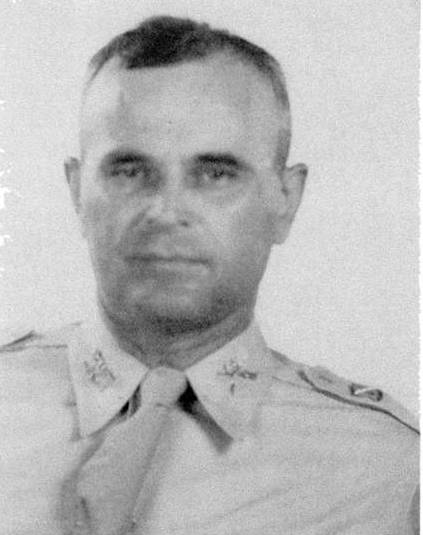
- Abraham in uniform, c. 1950

Adjutant General of Arkansas
- In office 1953–1955
- Preceded by: Brig. Gen. John B. Morris, Jr.
- Succeeded by: Maj. Gen. Sherman T. Clinger

Personal details
- Born: February 1, 1902 Arkadelphia, Arkansas, U.S.
- Died: June 11, 1960 (aged 58) Batesville, Arkansas, U.S.
- Resting place: Oaklawn Cemetery, Batesville, Arkansas, U.S.
- Spouse: Mary Adeline Brown
- Children: 2
- Education: Ouachita College

Military service
- Allegiance: United States
- Branch/service: Army
- Rank: Major General (AR)
- Commands: 153d Infantry
- Battles/wars: World War II: Aleutian Islands
- Awards: Distinguished Service Medal (Arkansas)
- Coaching career

Coaching career (HC unless noted)
- 1935: Arkansas College

Administrative career (AD unless noted)
- 1935–1936: Arkansas College

Lucien Abraham (February 1, 1902 – June 11, 1960) was an American college football coach who served as the Adjutant General of Arkansas from 1953 to 1955.

== Coaching career ==
Lucien Abraham was the head football coach at Arkansas College (present-day Lyon College) at Batesville in 1935.

== Military service ==
During World War II, Abraham served with the 153d Infantry, Alaskan Department, in the Aleutian Islands. In January 1953, he was appointed Adjutant General of Arkansas by Governor Francis Cherry. In December 1953, Abraham was promoted to the State grade of major general in the Arkansas Army National Guard.

Military offices
Preceded by Brigadier General John B. Morris, Jr.	Adjutant General of Arkansas; 1953–1955	Succeeded by Brigadier General Sherman T. Clinger
