= 142nd Field Artillery Brigade =

- Shoulder sleeve insignia
- Active: 1905 - present
- Country: United States
- Allegiance: Arkansas Army National Guard
- Branch: United States Army National Guard
- Type: Field Artillery
- Role: Force Field Artillery Headquarters
- Size: Brigade
- Part of: 29th Infantry Division (United States)
- Garrison/HQ: Fayetteville, Arkansas
- Motto: Answer The Call

Insignia
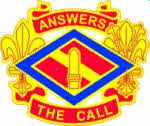
- Distinctive unit insignia

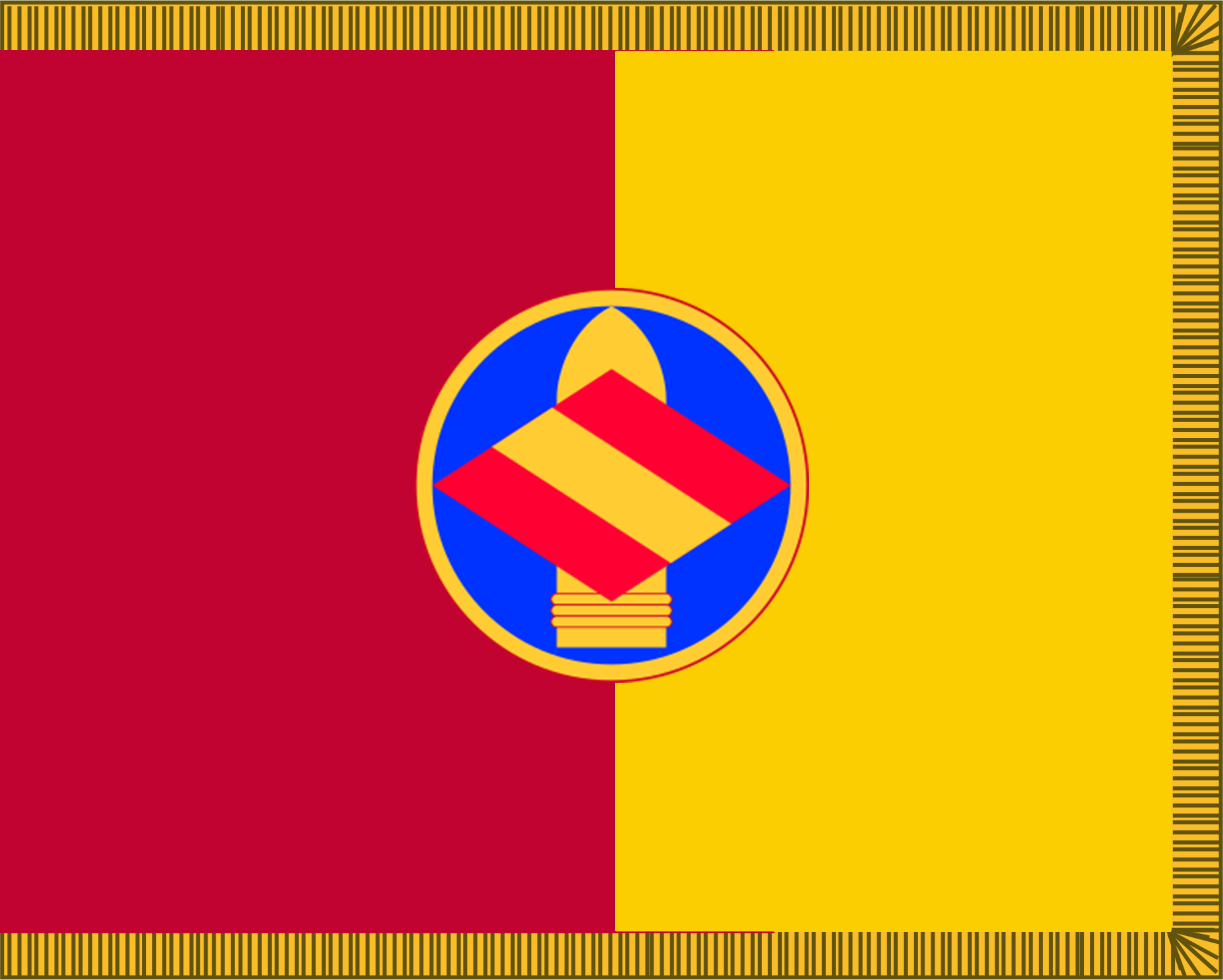
- 142nd Field Artillery Brigade Flag

The 142nd Field Artillery Brigade is a field artillery brigade in the Arkansas Army National Guard (ARNG). The 142nd is currently under administrative control of the 29th Infantry Division.

== History ==
The Headquarters and Headquarters Battery of the 142nd Field Artillery Brigade carries the lineage of Company B, 2nd Infantry Regiment, Arkansas State Guard, first organized 1905-1910. As an infantry unit, the unit mobilized for the Mexican Expedition, but did not actually participate in operations.

Mobilized again for World War I, the unit was reorganized as Battery B, 142nd Field Artillery, an element of the 39th Division. Arriving in France in September 1918, the 142nd was detached from the 39th Division to serve as corps artillery with the 64th Field Artillery Brigade, but only completed training on 8 November 1918, and did not participate in combat operations before the Armistice on 11 November. The unit did earn campaign participation credit, recognized by a World War I victory streamer without inscription, before returning to the United States and demobilizing 26 June 1919.

Between the world wars, the unit was reorganized as a coast artillery unit from 1923-1931, before being reconverted to field artillery as Battery A, 142nd Field Artillery. Mobilized again for World War II in 1941, the 142nd Field Artillery Regiment was broken up in 1943 to form the 142nd Field Artillery Group, the 936th Field Artillery Battalion, and the 937th Field Artillery Battalion. Battery A, 142nd, became Battery A, 936th Field Artillery Battalion, and served in Italy from 1943-1945. The unit earned four campaign streamers before inactivating on 16 October 1945.

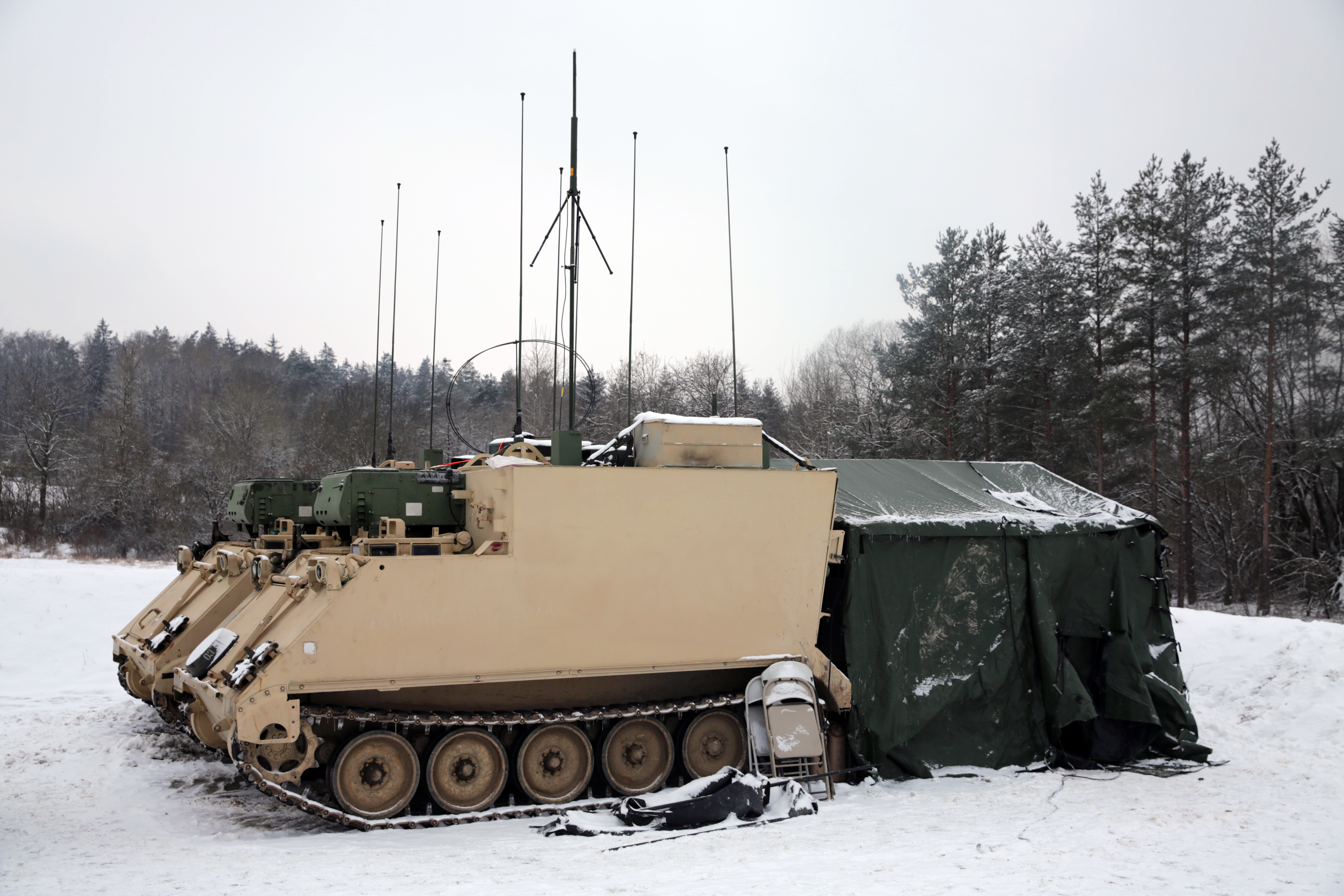
Soldiers of the brigade conduct artillery strike missions during Combined Resolve XV at Grafenwoehr Training Area, Germany, Feb. 9, 2021.

Batteries A and B, 936th Field Artillery Battalion were consolidated, reorganized and redesignated as Headquarters and Headquarters Battery (HHB), 142nd Field Artillery Group in 1946 as part of the rebuilding of the Army National Guard following the war. As part of the Korean War mobilization, HHB, 142nd FA Group was activated on 3 September 1950 and deployed to Germany as part of V Corps Artillery. Stationed at Wertheim, Germany, the group controlled four battalions of artillery. The group was inactivated and returned to Arkansas state control on 17 December 1954.

== Units in February 2026 ==
- 142nd Field Artillery Brigade, in Fayetteville (AR) — (Arkansas Army National Guard)
  - Headquarters and Headquarters Battery, 142nd Field Artillery Brigade, in Fayetteville (AR)
  - 1st Battalion, 117th Field Artillery Regiment, in Andalusia, Alabama (M777A2) — (Alabama Army National Guard)
    - Headquarters and Headquarters Battery, 1st Battalion, 117th Field Artillery Regiment, in Andalusia (AL)
    - Battery A, 1st Battalion, 117th Field Artillery Regiment, in Phenix City (AL)
    - Battery B, 1st Battalion, 117th Field Artillery Regiment, in Montgomery (AL)
    - Battery C, 1st Battalion, 117th Field Artillery Regiment, in Troy (AL)
    - 117th Forward Support Company, in Troy (AL)
      - Detachment 1, 117th Forward Support Company, in Elba (AL)
  - 1st Battalion, 142nd Field Artillery Regiment, in Bentonville (AR) (M270A2 MLRS) — (Arkansas Army National Guard)
    - Headquarters and Headquarters Battery, 1st Battalion, 142nd Field Artillery Regiment, in Bentonville (AR)
    - Battery A, 1st Battalion, 142nd Field Artillery Regiment, in Bentonville (AR)
    - Battery B, 1st Battalion, 142nd Field Artillery Regiment, in Bentonville (AR)
    - 936th Forward Support Company, in Bentonville (AR)
  - 2nd Battalion, 142nd Field Artillery Regiment, at Fort Chaffee (AR) (M109A6 Paladin) — (Arkansas Army National Guard)
    - Headquarters and Headquarters Battery, 2nd Battalion, 142nd Field Artillery Regiment, at Fort Chaffee (AR)
    - Battery A, 2nd Battalion, 142nd Field Artillery Regiment, at Fort Chaffee (AR)
    - Battery B, 2nd Battalion, 142nd Field Artillery Regiment, in Siloam Springs (AR)
    - Battery C, 2nd Battalion, 142nd Field Artillery Regiment, in Ozark (AR)
    - 937th Forward Support Company, at Fort Chaffee (AR)
  - 1st Battalion, 181st Field Artillery Regiment, in Chattanooga (TN) (M142 HIMARS) — (Tennessee Army National Guard)
    - Headquarters and Headquarters Battery, 1st Battalion, 181st Field Artillery Regiment, in Chattanooga (TN)
    - Battery A, 1st Battalion, 181st Field Artillery Regiment, in Lawrenceburg (TN)
    - Battery B, 1st Battalion, 181st Field Artillery Regiment, in Pulaski (TN)
      - Detachment 1, Battery B, 1st Battalion, 181st Field Artillery Regiment, in Fayetteville (TN)
    - 181st Forward Support Company, in Athens (TN)
      - Detachment 1, 181st Forward Support Company, in Dayton (TN)
  - 217th Brigade Support Battalion, in Lincoln (AR) — (Arkansas Army National Guard)
    - Headquarters Support Battery, 217th Brigade Support Battalion, in Lincoln (AR)
    - 142nd Signal Company, Fayetteville (AR)

== Lineage and honors ==
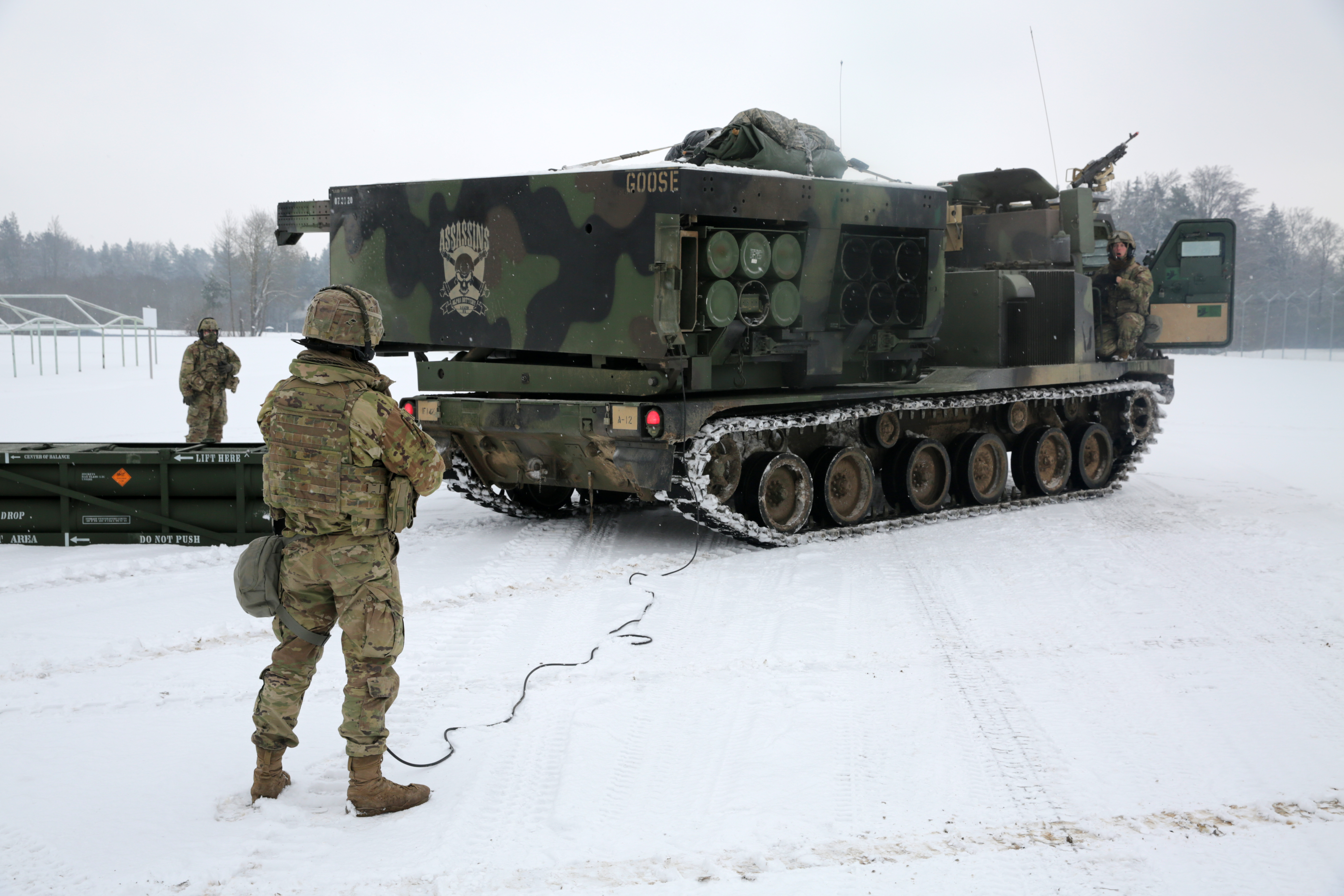
U.S. Soldiers assigned to Alpha Battery 1-142nd Field Artillery Brigade conduct artillery strike missions during Combined Resolve XV at the Grafenwoehr Training Area, Germany, Feb. 9, 2021.

=== Lineage ===
- Organized 1905-1910 in the Arkansas State Guard at Fayetteville as Company B, 2d Regiment of Infantry

(Arkansas State Guard redesignated 31 March 1907 as the Arkansas National Guard)

- Mustered into Federal service 6–9 July 1917 at Fort Logan H. Roots, Arkansas; mustered out of Federal service 9 March 1917 at Fort Logan H. Roots, Arkansas
- Mustered into Federal service 1 April 1917 at Camp Pike, Arkansas, as an element of the 39th Division
- Drafted into Federal service 5 August 1917
- Consolidated 1 November 1917 with Company M, 2d Regiment of Infantry (organized in 1897 at Harrison), converted, and redesignated as Battery B, 142d Field Artillery, an element of the 39th Division
- Demobilized 26 June 1919 at Camp Pike, Arkansas
- Former Company B, 2d Regiment of Infantry, reorganized and Federally recognized 4 December 1923 in the Arkansas National Guard at Fayetteville as Battery A, 206th Artillery (Coast Artillery Corps)
- Redesignated 22 April 1924 as Battery A, 206th Coast Artillery
- Converted and redesignated 3 September 1931 as Battery A, 142d Field Artillery
- Inducted into Federal service 6 January 1941 at Fayetteville
- Reorganized and redesignated 25 February 1943 as Battery A, 936th Field Artillery Battalion
- Inactivated 16 October 1945 in Italy
- Consolidated with Battery B, 936th Field Artillery Battalion (see ANNEX 1), and consolidated unit reorganized and Federally recognized 24 October 1946 at Fayetteville as Headquarters and Headquarters Battery, 142d Field Artillery Group
- Ordered into active Federal service 3 September 1950 at Fayetteville

(Headquarters and Headquarters Battery, 142d Field Artillery Group [NGUS], organized and Federally recognized 10 September 1952 at Fayetteville.)

- Released 17 December 1954 from active Federal service and reverted to state control; Federal recognition concurrently withdrawn from Headquarters and Headquarters Battery, 142d Field Artillery Group (NGUS)
- Ordered into active Federal service 24 September 1957 at Fayetteville
- Released 23 October 1957 from active Federal service and reverted to state control
- Redesignated 1 June 1959 as Headquarters and Headquarters Battery, 142d Artillery Group
- Redesignated 1 May 1972 as Headquarters and Headquarters Battery, 142d Field Artillery Group
- Redesignated 1 May 1978 as Headquarters and Headquarters Battery, 142d Field Artillery Brigade
- Ordered into active Federal service 2 June 1980 at Fayetteville
- Released 3 June 1980 from active Federal service and reverted to state control.
- Ordered into active Federal service 21 November 1990 at Fayetteville
- Released 11 September 1991 from active Federal service and reverted to state control
- Consolidated 30 September 1996 with Headquarters Detachment, 937th Signal Battalion (see ANNEX 2), and consolidated unit designated as Headquarters and Headquarters Battery, 142d Field Artillery Brigade
- Reorganized and redesignated 3 September 2006 as Headquarters and Headquarters Battery, 142d Fires Brigade

ANNEX 1

- Organized and Federally recognized 18 May 1927 in the Arkansas National Guard at Fayetteville as Battery E, 206th Coast Artillery
- Converted and redesignated 2 September 1931 as Battery B, 142d Field Artillery
- Inducted into Federal service 6 January 1941 at Fayetteville
- Reorganized and redesignated 25 February 1943 as Battery B, 936th Field Artillery Battalion
- Inactivated 16 October 1945 in Italy

ANNEX 2

- Organized and Federally recognized 26 April 1937 in the Arkansas National Guard at Fayetteville as Headquarters Battery and Combat Train, 3d Battalion, 142d Field Artillery
- Redesignated 14 July 1937 as Headquarters Battery and Combat Train, 1st Battalion, 142d Field Artillery
- Reorganized and redesignated 1 July 1940 as Headquarters Battery, 1st Battalion, 142d Field Artillery
- Inducted into Federal service 6 January 1941 at Fayetteville
- Reorganized and redesignated 25 February 1943 as Headquarters Battery, 936th Field Artillery Battalion
- Inactivated 16 October 1945 in Italy
- Reorganized and Federally recognized 24 October 1946 at Fayetteville
- Ordered into active Federal service 19 August 1950 at Fayetteville

(Headquarters Battery, 936th Field artillery Battalion [NGUS], organized and Federally recognized 10 September 1952 at Fayetteville.)

- Released 10 November 1954 from active Federal service and reverted to state control; Federal recognition concurrently withdrawn from Headquarters Battery, 936th Field Artillery Battalion (NGUS)
- Ordered into active Federal service 24 September 1957 at Fayetteville
- Released 23 October 1957 from active Federal service and reverted to state control
- Reorganized and redesignated 1 June 1959 as Headquarters Battery, 1st Howitzer Battalion, 142d Artillery
- Reorganized and redesignated 1 December 1967 as part of Headquarters Battery, 1st Battalion, 142d Artillery
- Converted and redesignated 8 January 1972 as the 141st Signal Company
- Redesignated 1 October 1975 as the 131st Signal Company
- Reorganized and redesignated 1 September 1980 as Headquarters Company, 937th Signal Battalion
- Reorganized and redesignated 1 October 1985 as Headquarters Detachment, 937th Signal Battalion

Note: Italicized sections of the lineage are not posted on the CMH lineage database as of 2014, but are listed by McKenny as of 2010. Included because the CMH lineage doesn't make sense, since the 142nd FAB participated in Operation Desert Storm as a Field Artillery Brigade.

=== Campaign participation credit ===
- World War I: Streamer without inscription
- World War II: Naples-Foggia; Rome-Arno; North Apennines; Po Valley
- Southwest Asia: Liberation and Defense of Kuwait; Cease-Fire

=== Decorations ===
None

== Heraldry ==
=== Shoulder Sleeve Insignia ===

- Description: a circular device consisting of a yellow vertical projectile on a blue background surmounted by a red diamond, long axis horizontal, bearing a yellow diagonal stripe from upper left to lower right, all within a yellow border.
- Symbolism: Scarlet and yellow are the traditional colors of field artillery organizations. the diamond shape and blue background refer to Arkansas, the unit's home state, and the gold diagonal stripe on the scarlet background, from the coat of arms of the Marquis de Lafayette, alludes to Fayetteville, Arkansas, the home station of the unit's headquarters. the projectile indicates the unit's mission and firepower potential.

=== Distinctive unit insignia ===
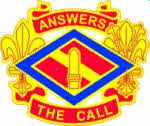

- Description: a gold color metal and enamel device consisting of a scarlet diamond, long axis horizontal, bearing throughout a gold diagonal stripe from upper left to lower right, and charged overall with a gold artillery projectile extending vertically from base, all within a blue border and all in front of a gold fleur-de-lis on the left; at the top, on a scarlet arched scroll tangent to the peak of the diamond and between the central lobes of the fleurs-de-lis, the inscription “Answers,” and in reverse arch in base, a scarlet scroll with ends folded in back of the fleurs-de-lis inscribed “the Call,” all letters gold. The central areas between the scrolls and diamond are pierced.
- Symbolism: Scarlet and yellow (gold) are the colors used for artillery. The gold fleur-de-lis on the left indicates the unit's campaign participation credit in World War I, and the Florentine fleurde-lis on the right refers to the World War ii campaign honors, which were all in Italy. The blue diamond from the crest for units of the Arkansas National Guard, denotes the organization's allotment to that state. The gold diagonal stripe on the scarlet background, from the coat of arms of the Marquis de Lafayette, alludes to Fayetteville, Arkansas, the headquarters of the organization. Additionally, the upright projectile (1), the sides of the diamond (4), and the fleurs-de-lis (2) allude to the numerical designation of the organization.

== See also ==
- Arkansas Army National Guard and the Global War on Terrorism
- Operation Desert Storm
- Arkansas Army National Guard in Operation Desert Storm
- Arkansas Army National Guard and the Cold War
- Arkansas Army National Guard and the Korean War
