= List of equipment of the United Arab Emirates Army =

Modern equipment in service with the United Arab Emirates Army

== Small arms ==
Model	Image	Origin	Type	Caliber	Notes
Handguns
Caracal pistol		United Arab Emirates	Handgun	9×19mm Parabellum	Standard issue pistol
SIG Sauer P320		United States Germany Switzerland	Handgun	9×19mm Parabellum	Locally produced by Caracal International.
Browning Hi-Power		Belgium / United States	Handgun	9×19mm Parabellum	
SIG Sauer P226		West Germany Germany / Switzerland	Handgun	9×19mm Parabellum	
Submachine guns
MP5		West Germany / Germany	Submachine gun	9×19mm NATO	Used by the Marines and the Air Force.
Rifles
CAR 816/Sultan		United Arab Emirates	Assault rifle	5.56×45mm NATO	Standard service rifle. 80,000 assault rifles.
AK-47		Soviet Union	Assault rifle	7.62×39mm	In reserve, most captured from enemy countries.
M16A4		United States	Assault rifle	5.56×45mm NATO	In reserve.
T91 assault rifle		Republic of China	Assault rifle	5.56×45mm NATO	10K rifles delivered. Used only by Special Forces.
Machine guns
Heckler & Koch MG5		Germany	General-purpose machine gun	7.62×51mm NATO	
M2 Browning		United States	Heavy machine gun	12.7×99mm NATO	Used on vehicles and Tripods.
FN Minimi		Belgium	Light machine gun	5.56×45mm NATO	
M249 light machine gun		Belgium / United States	Light machine gun	5.56×45mm NATO	Standard issue light machine gun.
Sniper rifles and designated marksman rifles
M107/M107A1		United States	Anti-materiel rifle	12.7×99mm NATO	Standard issue anti materiel rifle.
Lobaev Sniper Rifle		United Arab Emirates; Russia	Sniper rifle	12.7×99mm NATO	Locally produced.
PSG-1		West Germany	Sniper rifle	7.62×51mm NATO	
CSR 50		United Arab Emirates	Anti-materiel precision rifle	12.7×99mm	Seen during military training.
Denel NTW-20		South Africa	Anti-materiel precision rifle	14.5×114mm	
Grenade launcher
M203 grenade launcher		United States	Grenade launcher	40×46mm SR	Attaches to M4 and M16 rifles.
RG-6 grenade launcher		Russia	Grenade launcher	40 mm grenades	
Anti-tank/Anti armor weapon
FGM-148 Javelin		United States	Guidance systemAnti-tank missile	127mm	Standard AT Weapon
9M133 Kornet		Russia	Laser-guided Anti-tank missile	152mm	Anti Tank Missile
M3 MAAWS		Sweden	Recoilless rifle	84mm	

== Artillery ==
Model	Image	Origin	Type	Number	Notes
Rocket artillery
M142 HIMARS		United States	Multiple rocket launcher	12	Ordered in September 2014.
SR-5		China	Multiple rocket launcher	5	
K239 Chunmoo		Republic of Korea	Multiple rocket launcher	12	Purchased in 2021. 12 Chunmoo multiple rocket launchers, 12 ammunition supply vehicles, and Korean GPS guided missiles and logistics support contracts.
Self-propelled artillery
M109		United States	Self-propelled artillery	87	In August 1995, Abu Dhabi purchased 87 M109A3 from the Royal Netherlands Army.
G6		Republic of South Africa (1961–1994) / South Africa	Self-propelled artillery	78	
Towed artillery
AH4		China	Howitzer	6	On 21 February 2019, the United Arab Emirates military confirmed the acquisition of 6 Norinco AH4 gun-howitzers.
L118 light gun		United Kingdom	Field gun	73	
Type 59		China	Field gun	20	

== Air defense weapons ==
Model	Image	Origin	Type	Number	Notes
Terminal High Altitude Area Defense		United States	Anti-ballistic missile system	2 batteries	In 2011 United Arab Emirates ordered the Terminal High Altitude Area Defense (THAAD) which made the United Arab Emirates the first foreign country to obtain the THAAD system. In 2022 United Arab Emirates claimed that it has successfully intercepted a ballistic missile during a Houthi militia attack in Abu Dhabi.
MIM-104 Patriot		United States	Mobile surface-to-air missile/anti-ballistic missile system	12	United Arab Emirates has 9 PAC-3 batteries and 3 PAC-2 batteries (818 missiles).
MIM-23 Hawk		United States	Surface-to-air missile	343	United Arab Emirates owns Phase I and Phase III.
KM-SAM		South Korea	Mobile surface-to-air missile/anti-ballistic missile system	(10)	In January 2022 United Arab Emirates acquired the KM-SAM system. Both countries will jointly help to deliver the systems. 3 systems were delivered out of 10.
Pantsir		Russia	Self-propelled anti-aircraft weapon	50	United Arab Emirates owns the S1 version.

== Vehicles ==
Model	Image	Origin	Type	Number	Note
Tanks
Leclerc		France	Main battle tank	354	The Leclerc tanks of the United Arab Emirates Army have been used in combat operations in Yemen during the Yemeni civil war.
Infantry fighting vehicles
FNSS ACV-300		Turkey	Infantry fighting vehicle	136	
BMP-3		Russia	Infantry fighting vehicle	652	250 for Abu Dhabi and 402 for Dubai (of which 391 delivered in 1992–1997) with "Namut" thermal sight and other modifications. They were under further upgrade with modular armour "Kaktus" and UTD-32 engine.
Armoured personnel carriers
Patria AMV		Finland	Armoured personnel carrier	45	An initial batch of 15 vehicles was ordered in 2008, with more to be acquired. Some of these vehicles will be equipped with the Patria NEMO turret, while others will be equipped with BMP-3 turrets and have therefore been modified, including a longer hull. In January 2016, the General Headquarters of the United Arab Emirates armed forces ordered 45 Patria AMV hulls with the option of 50 more. The APCs are used now in Yemen in combat operations. The vehicles were shipped in June 2016 from Patria's Polish production line.
Otokar-Al Jassor Rabdan		Turkey; United Arab Emirates	Armoured personnel carrier/Infantry fighting vehicle	700	Al Jasoor is expected to produce up to 700 Rabdans for a value of $661 million for the United Arab Emirates Army. The first batch of 400 Rabdan vehicles was delivered in 2017, with 300 more to be locally assembled and produced under license. Some with BMP-3 turret in service.
Light Armoured Vehicles
Nimr Hafeet		United Arab Emirates	Infantry mobility vehicle	675	
Nimr Ajban		United Arab Emirates	Infantry mobility vehicle	350-500	In the primary use of all warfare branches.
HMMWV		United States	Infantry mobility vehicle	150/250?	Seen in combat in Yemen against Houthi rebels.
M1288 GMV 1.1		United States	Light ground mobility vehicle	100/150?	Seen in multiple UAE SOF trainings and live shows.
Polaris RZR		United States	Side-by-side	N/A	
MRAPs
BAE Caiman		United States; United Kingdom	MRAP	931	In September 2014, the United States approved a $2.5 billion deal with the United Arab Emirates Army for over 4,500 surplus U.S. MRAPs for increased force protection, conducting humanitarian assistance operations, and protecting some international commercial trade routes and some infrastructure. 1150 vehicles were Caimans.
International MaxxPro		United States	MRAP	3,375	Multiple versions on order.
Oshkosh M-ATV		United States	MRAP	750	750 as of 2016.
Nimr Jais		United Arab Emirates	MRAP	250-500	In 2017 United Arab Emirates Armed Forces ordered 1500 Nimr Jais, but the deal got scrapped, though a number of vehicles was received by the UAE army forces.
RG-31 Nyala		South Africa / United Kingdom	MRAP	76	United Arab Emirates owns the special version RG-31 MARK-5. Locally produced by International Golden Group.
CBRN defense
TPz Fuchs		West Germany	CBRN defense	32	32 NBC reconnaissance vehicles were ordered in February 2005 under a contract valued at 160 million EUROS (US$205 million) FUCHS-2 Variant. The order comprises 16 NBC reconnaissance vehicles, eight bio vehicles and eight command post vehicles, which will provide United Arab Emirates with an NBC detection capability linked to a command-and-control system.
Trucks
MZKT-74135		Belarus	Tank transporter	40	
MAN SX		Austria; West Germany / Germany	high-mobility off-road	N/A	
Tatra T 815		Czechoslovakia / Czech Republic	high-mobility tactical truck, water tanker, fuel tanker, flatrack carrier, container carrier, and recovery vehicle.	?	
Oshkosh HET		United States	tank transporter and tractor unit.	20	Used for transporting the Jodaria Cradle Multiple Rocket Launcher.

=== Decommissioned equipment ===
- (North Korea) Hwasong-5 - 25 (ordered 1989, decommissioned due to dissatisfactory quality)
