= AH4 howitzer =

Chinese 155 mm towed artillery

AH4 Lightweight Towed Howitzer
- Type: Towed howitzer
- Place of origin: China

Production history
- Produced: 2016–present

Specifications
- Mass: 4.5 t (4.4 long tons; 5.0 short tons)
- Crew: 7
- Shell: 155mm ERFB-HB/HE, ERFB-Base Bleed/HE, ERFB-Rocket Assist/HE, Laser Guided GP6
- Caliber: 155 mm (6.1 in)
- Carriage: split trail
- Elevation: −3° to +72°
- Effective firing range: ERFB-HB/HE: 25 km (16 mi); ERFB-Base Bleed/HE: 30 km (19 mi) base bleed ERFB-Rocket Assist/HE: 40 km (25 mi); LGP GP6: 25 km (16 mi)

The AH4 howitzer is a Chinese 155 mm towed howitzer system manufactured by Norinco. Its main characteristic is that it has been designed to be lightweight, which allows greater tactical mobility. The weight of 4.5 t (4.4 long tons; 5.0 short tons), compared to a traditional system that can weigh 18 t (18 long tons; 20 short tons), allows the system to be airlifted via heavy-lift helicopters like the CH-47 or Mi-26, or transport aircraft like a C-130 or Y-8. Also, as a modern towed howitzer system, it possesses a range of engagement of up to 40 km (25 mi) using rocket-assisted projectiles.

== Design ==
The body of the system has forward stabilizers as well as spades and dampers. It has a 155mm L/39 calibre cannon that can fire shells with an elevation angle from -3° up to 72° with a traverse limit of 22°. The hydro-pneumatic suspension allows for quick deployment of around 3 minutes and packing in 2 minutes.

AH4 has an initial rate of fire up to 5 rounds per minute, and with continuous firing at 2 rounds per minute.

== Variants ==
- AHS-4: a 3.5–3.8 t (3.4–3.7 long tons; 3.9–4.2 short tons) variant that is designed for mountain warfare.

== Export to the United Arab Emirates ==
According to Defense World, in 2016 Norinco's AH4-155 won its first export order from an unidentified customer from the Middle East, it beat the M-777 counterpart from BAE systems. In February 2019, the United Arab Emirates confirmed it had procured the AH4 howitzers, and that it had received at least one batch of six systems.

== Operators ==
- United Arab Emirates
- Yemen: Reportedly supplied to Southern Giants Brigade by United Arab Emirates.

== Comparable howitzers ==
- M777 howitzer – British/American 155 mm towed artillery
