= Arkansas Army National Guard and the Cold War =

Changes to an Arkansas military division in the mid-to-late Twentieth Century

The history of the Arkansas Army National Guard and the Cold War involves several statewide re-organizations that occurred as a result of the evolving structure of United States Army Divisions and Brigades. In 1959 the state re-organized and restationed units in response to the Army's adoption of the Pentomic Division, the structure which was designed to counter the Soviet threat in eastern Europe. Several Arkansas National Guard units were mobilized in 1960 as part of the Berlin Crisis. In 1963 the state reorganized again as the administration of President John F. Kennedy focused on "Flexible Response" and divisions reorganized to meet the challenged of numerous small wars such as the war in Vietnam. In 1967 the 39th Infantry Division was reorganized as the 39th Infantry Brigade (Separate) as a result of a plan to reduce the total number of National Guard Divisions nationwide. The state would eventually gain a new headquarters, the State Area Command in order to provide a higher headquarters for several units which were not assigned to either the 142nd Field Artillery Brigade or the 39th Infantry Brigade (Separate).

== Reorganization of 1959 ==
In 1959, the 39th Division was reorganized, along with all other National Guard divisions, in accordance with the new Pentomic Division Concept. This concept attempted to provide a new divisional structure to fight on the atomic battlefield. The reorganization resulted in the end of the Regiment as a tactical unit. Traditionally, regiments were the basic branch element, especially for the infantry, and their long histories had produced deep traditions considered essential to unit esprit de corps. The new divisional structure, replacing infantry regiments with anonymous battle groups, threatened to destroy all of these traditions. Secretary of the Army Wilber M. Brucker settled the question on 24 January 1957 when he approved the Combat Arms Regimental System. Although regiments (armored cavalry notwithstanding) would no longer exist as tactical units, certain distinguished regiments were to become "parent" organizations for the combat arms. Under the new concept, the Department of the Army assumed control of regimental headquarters – the repository for a unit's lineage, honors, and traditions – and used elements of the regiments to organize battle groups, battalions, squadrons, companies, batteries, and troops, which shared in the history and honors of their parent units. In place of the Regiment or Brigade, the new Pentomic Infantry Division fielded five Battle Groups, each containing 1,356 soldiers.

The 153rd Infantry was reorganized 1 June 1959 as a parent regiment under the Combat Arms Regimental System, to consist of the 1st, and 2nd, Battle Groups, elements of the 39th Infantry Division. The 445th Field Artillery Battalion, Arkansas National Guard, was re-designated as the 1st Battalion, 206th Artillery, and was organized as a composite battalion with one battery of 105 mm towed howitzers and one battery of 155 mm towed howitzers. The 437th Field Artillery Battalion, Arkansas National Guard, was re-designated as the 2nd Battalion, 206th Artillery and was organized as a composite battalion with one battery of 105 mm towed howitzers and one battery of 155 mm towed howitzers. A new battalion was created in the Arkansas National Guard from existing units, 3rd Battalion, 206th Artillery was a composite unit with one 8-inch howitzer battery and one MGR-1 Honest John rocket battery. The 206th Tank Battalion, Arkansas Army National Guard, was reorganized to become the 1st Medium Tank Battalion, 206th Armor Regiment. This reorganization required a large scale restationing of units within the state:

New Unit	Former Unit	Station	Federal Recognition Dates
HQ and HQ Company (Part), 39th Inf Div	HQ, 39th Div (Part)	Little Rock	26 August 1947
39th Administration Company	Ambulance Company, 125th Medical Battalion	Little Rock	26 August 1947
HQ and HQ Det (Part), 39th Inf Div Tn (-Band)	HQ and HQ Company, 153rd Infantry	Little Rock	20 November 1946
39th Aviation Company (Part)	Company A (FWD) 739th Ordnance Battalion	Little Rock	19 November 1952
HQ and HQ Company, 1st Battle Group, 153rd Infantry	Company B, 153rd Infantry (Company E 212th Sig BN)	Malvern	9 October 1947
Company A, 1st Battle Group (-Rifle and Wpns Platoons)	Heavy Mortar Company, 153rd IN	DeQueen	26 June 1931
Det 1, Company A (Rifle and Wpns Platoons) 1st Battle Group	Company A, 153rd Infantry	Hope	3 Mar 1947
Company B, 1st Battle Group	HQ and HQ Company, 1st Battalion, 153rd Infantry	Texarkana	19 November 194?
Company C, 1st Battle Group	Company C, 153rd Infantry	Prescot	19 November 1946
Company D, 1st Battle Group	Company D, 153rd Infantry	Arkadelphia	21 November 1946
Company E, 1st Battle Group	Company C, 217th Engineer Battalion	Magnolia	25 October 1946
Combat Support Company, 1st Battle Group	Battery A, 937th, (Service Company, 937th FA)	Mena	20 November 1946
HQ and HQ Company, 2nd Battle Group, 153rd Infantry	Service Company, 153rd Infantry (218th Med Company)	Searcy	29 January 1947
Company A, 2nd Battle Group	Company K, 153rd Infantry	Walnut Ridge	30 January 1947
Company B, 2nd Battle Group	Company L, 153rd Infantry	Batesville	21 November 1946
Company C, 2nd Battle Group	HQ and HQ Company, 3rd Battalion, 153rd Infantry	Beebe	24 December 1946
Company D, 2nd Battle Group	Company G, 153rd Infantry	Conway	20 November 1946
Company E, 2nd Battle Group	HQ and HQ Company, 2nd Battalion, 153rd Infantry	Morrilton	20 November 1946
Combat Support Company, 2nd Battle Group	Battery B, 437th Field Artillery	Newport	24 October 1946
HQ and HQ Battery, 39th Inf Div Artillery	HQ and HQ Battery, 39th Inf Div Artillery (Part)	Little Rock	22 October 1946
HQ and HQ Battery, 1st How Bn (105mm/155mm), 206th Arty	HQ and HQ SVC Company 875th Engr Bn (Hv Const)	Pine Bluff	25 November 1952
Battery A (105mm), 1st How Bn, 206th Arty	Service Battery, 437th FA BN	Sheridan	22 December 1949
Battery B (155mm), 1st How Bn, 206th Arty	Battery C, 437th FA BN	Dumas	9 October 1947
HQ and HQ Battery, 2nd How Bn (105mm/155mm), 206th Arty	HQ and HQ Battery, 437th FA BN	Hazen	26 November 1946
Battery A (105mm), 2nd How Bn, 206th Arty	Company C, 875th Engr Bn	Stuttgart	16 April 1954
Battery B (155mm), 2nd How Bn, 206th Arty	Battery C, 445th FA BN	Brinkley	29 January 1947
HQ and HQ Battery, 3rd Rocket Howitzer BN (HJ / 8in)	HQ and HQ Battery, 445th FA Bn	Marianna	19 November 1946
Battery A (8 inch Howitzer)(towed), 3rd Rkt How BN, 206th Arty	Battery A, 445th FA Bn	Helena	19 November 1946
Battery B (Honest John Rocket)(SP), 3rd Rkt How BN, 206th Arty	Battery D, 326th AAA BN	West Helena	8 July 1955
HQ and HQ Company, 1st Medium Tank BN (Patton), 206th Armor	Company A, 206th Tank Bn	Warren	4 March 1947
Company A, 1st Medium Tank BN (Patton), 206th Armor	HQ and HQ Service Company, 206th Tank Bn	El Doradon	6 February 1947
Company B, 1st Medium Tank BN (Patton), 206th Armor	Company A, 206th Tank Bn	Camden	27 January 1947
Company C, 1st Medium Tank BN (Patton), 206th Armor	Company C, 206th Armor	Fordyce	5 February 1947
Company D, 1st Medium Tank BN (Patton), 206th Armor	Company D, 206th Armor	Crossett	3 October 1955
Company E, 1st Medium Tank BN (Patton), 206th Armor	Company D, 217th Engr Bn	McGehee	5 March 1947
HQ and HQ Company 217th Engr BN	HQ and HQ SVR, Company 217th Engr BN (Med Det, 217th Engr BN)(Company H, 153rd IN Reg)	Russellville	22 October 1946
Company A, 217th Engr BN	Company A, 217th Engr BN	Russellville	22 October 1946
Company B, 217th Engr BN	Company F, 153rd Infantry Regiment	Dardanelle	25 October 1946
Company C, 217th Engr BN	Company A, 212th Signal Battalion	Danville	16 May 1955
Company D, 217th Engr BN	Company A, 875th Engr BN	Perryville	9 April 1953
Company E, 217th Engr BN	Company E, 153rd Infantry	Clarksville	3 February 1947
HQ and HQ Det, 125th Med BN	HQ and HQ Company, 125th Med BN	Little Rock	26 August 1947
Company A (Amb), 125th Med BN	235th Med Company	Lonoke	19 July 1959
Company B (Clr), 125th Med BN	CLR Company, 125th Med BN	Little Rock	26 August 1947
HQ and Company A, 739th Ordnance Battalion	HQ and HQ Det, 739th Ordnance Battalion	Little Rock	7 February 1947
Company B, 739th Ordnance Battalion	172nd Engr Company	Pine Bluff	5 February 1956
HQ and HQ Battery, 142nd Artillery	HQ and HQ Battery, 142nd Artillery	Fayetteville	24 October 1946
HQ and HQ Battery, 1st Battalion, (155mm)(Towed) 142nd Artillery	HQ and HQ Battery, 936th Artillery	Fayetteville	24 October 1946
Medical Detachment, 1st Battalion, (155mm)(Towed) 142nd Artillery	Medical Detachment, 936th Artillery	Fayetteville	1947
Battery A, 1st Battalion, (155mm)(Towed) 142nd Artillery	Battery A, 936th Artillery Battalion	Bentonville	1947
Battery B, 1st Battalion, (155mm)(Towed) 142nd Artillery	Battery B, 936th Artillery Battalion	Siloam Springs	6 February 1956
Battery C, 1st Battalion, (155mm)(Towed) 142nd Artillery	Battery C, 936th Artillery Battalion	Rogers	24 February 1946
Service Battery, 1st Battalion, (155mm)(Towed) 142nd Artillery	Service Battery, 936th Artillery Battalion	Lincoln	12 December 1955
HQ and HQ Battery, 2nd Battalion, (8 inch)(SP) 142nd Artillery	HQ and HQ Battery, 937th Artillery	Fort Smith	23 October 1946
Battery A, 2nd Battalion, (8 inch)(SP) 142nd Artillery	Company C, 212th Signal Battalion	Van Buren	28 November 1955
Battery B, 2nd Battalion, (8 inch)(SP) 142nd Artillery	Battery B, 937th Artillery Battalion	Paris	23 October 1946
Battery C, 2nd Battalion, (8 inch)(SP) 142nd Artillery	Battery C, 937th Artillery Battalion, (Med Det, 937th FA)	Ozark	3 February 1947
Service Battery, 2nd Battalion, (8 inch)(SP) 142nd Artillery	233rd Med Company	Charleston	1 December 1955
HQ and HQ Battery, 3rd Battalion, (155mm)(Towed) 142nd Artillery	HQ and HQ Battery, 151st AAA BN (Battery D, 151st AAA BN)	Harrison	30 November 1955
Medical Detachment, 3rd Battalion, (155mm)(Towed) 142nd Artillery	Medical Detachment, 151st AAA BN	Harrison	23 January 1957
Battery A, 3rd Battalion, (155mm)(Towed) 142nd Artillery	Battery A, 151st AAA BN	Mountain Home	21 November 1955
Battery B, 3rd Battalion, (155mm)(Towed) 142nd Artillery	Battery B, 151st AAA BN	Berryville	7 December 1955
Battery C, 3rd Battalion, (155mm)(Towed) 142nd Artillery	Company B, 212th Sig BN	Springdale	21 June 1955
Service Battery, 3rd Battalion, (155mm)(Towed) 142nd Artillery	Battery C, 151st AAA	Marshall	21 February 1956
HQ and HQ Battery, 4th Battalion, (8 inch)(SP) 142nd Artillery	HQ and HQ Battery, 709th Artillery Battalion	Paragould	19 May 1955
Battery A, 4th Battalion, (8 inch)(SP) 142nd Artillery	Battery A, 326th AAA Battalion (Med Det, 326th AAA BN)	Marked Tree	20 July 1955
Battery B, 4th Battalion, (8 inch)(SP) 142nd Artillery	Company M, 153rd Infantry	Blytheville	30 January 1947
Battery C, 4th Battalion, (8 inch)(SP) 142nd Artillery	Battery C, 709th Artillery Battalion	Piggott	19 September 1955
Service Battery, 4th Battalion, (8 inch)(SP) 142nd Artillery	Battery A, 709th Artillery Battalion	Rector	24 May 1955
HQ and HQ Battery, 5th Battalion, (155mm)(SP) 142nd Artillery	HQ and HQ Battery, 326th AAA BN	West Memphis	22 June 1955
Medical Detachment, 5th Battalion, (155mm)(SP) 142nd Artillery	None	West Memphis	1 June 1959
Battery A, 5th Battalion, (155mm)(SP) 142nd Artillery	Service Battery, 445th Artillery Battalion (Service Battery, 709th FA BN)	Wynne	29 January 1947
Battery B, 5th Battalion, (155mm)(SP) 142nd Artillery	Battery B, 445th Artillery Battalion	Forrest City	19 November 1946
Battery C, 5th Battalion, (155mm)(SP) 142nd Artillery	Battery B, 709th Artillery Battalion	Augusta	20 June 1955
Service Battery, 5th Battalion, (155mm)(SP) 142nd Artillery	Battery B, 326th AAA BN	West Memphis	14 February 1956
Headquarters and Headquarters Service Company, 875th Engineer Battalion	Headquarters and Headquarters Battery, 327th Anti Aircraft Artillery Battalion	Jonesboro	22 September 1955
Medical Detachment, 875th Engineer Battalion	Medical Detachment, 327th Anti Aircraft Artillery Battalion	Jonesboro	20 October 1955
Company A, 875th Engineer Battalion	Battery A and Battery D, 327th Anti Aircraft Artillery Battalion	Jonesboro	22 September 1955
Company B, 875th Engineer Battalion	Battery B, 327th Anti Aircraft Artillery Battalion & Company I, 153rd Infantry Regiment	Jonesboro	20 November 1945
Company C(-), 875th Engineer Battalion	Battery C, 326th AAA BN	Harrisburg	21 December 1955
Det 1 (Gen Construction Platoon) Company C, 875th Engineer Battalion	Battery C, 326th AAA BN	Jonesboro	13 October 1955
Headquarters and Headquarters Company, 212th Signal Battalion (Combat Area) (Army)	Headquarters and Headquarters Company, 212th Signal Battalion (Corps)	Little Rock	3 May 1954
Company A, 212th Signal Battalion (Combat Area) (Army)	Battery A, 437th Field Artillery	Hot Springs	24 December 1946
Company B, 212th Signal Battalion (Combat Area) (Army)	Medical Detachment, 153rd Infantry Company	Benton	20 November 1946
Company C, 212th Signal Battalion (Combat Area) (Army)	Tank Company, 153rd Infantry Company	Pine Bluff	5 March 1947
Company D, 212th Signal Battalion (Combat Area) (Army)	Company D, 212th Signal Battalion (Corps)	Little Rock	3 January 1955
Company D, 212th Signal Battalion (Combat Area) (Army)	Company D, 212th Signal Battalion (Corps)	Little Rock	3 January 1955
Headquarters and Headquarters Detachment, 1?st Medical Battalion	Headquarters and Headquarters Detachment, 101st Medical Battalion	Booneville	2 December 1948
216th Medical Company (Clearing)	216th Medical Company	Lake Village	13 June 2 December 1955
219th Ambulance Company	219th Ambulance Company	DeWitt	3 October 1953
295th Medical Company (Holding)	295th Medical Company (Holding)	Dermontt	24 April 1956
296th Medical Company (Holding)	296th Medical Company (Holding)	Booneville	3 September 1949
148th Evacuation Hospital	148th Evacuation Hospital	Little Rock	29 March 1955
172nd Engineer Company	Company B, 875th Engineer Battalion	Herber Springs	3 August 1955
121st MP (Escort Company)	39th MP Company	Fort Smith	4 February 1947
121st MP (Escort Company)	39th MP Company	Fort Smith	4 February 1947
176th Ordnance Company (DS)	176th Ordnance Company (DS)	Little Rock	1 June 1949
404th Ordnance Company (General Automotive Support)	Company B, 217th Engineer Battalion	Monticello	23 October 1946
106th Army Band	106th Army Band	Little Rock	22 October 1946

== Berlin Crisis ==
In 1961, during a period of increased tension between the Soviet Union and the United States, certain Arkansas National Guard units were authorized additional training as part of a Mobilization plan from the National Guard Bureau. Eventually seven Arkansas National Guard units would be mobilized for a period of up to 12 months under Presidential Executive Order 10957. Units were mobilized at homestations and reported to their designated mobilization station in October 1961. Most units remained on Active Duty until August 1962.

Unit	Mobilization Station	Arrival at Mob Station	Demobilization
184th Tac Recon Squadron	Fort Smith, AR	1 Oct 1961	20 August 1962
404th Ord Company	Fort Chaffee, AR	1 Oct 1961	4 August 1962
216th Medical Company	Fort Benning, GA	5 October 1961	8 August 1962
172nd Engineer Company	Fort Bragg, NC	7 October 1961	3 August 1962
219th Medical Company	Fort Chaffee, AR	9 October 1961	11 August 1962
148th Evacuation Hospital	Fort Chaffee, AR	15 October 1961	9 August 1962
296th Medical Company	Fort Chaffee, AR	27 October 1961	9 August 1962

== Reorganization of 1963 ==
By 1963 the Army again changed the basic design for an Infantry Division. The Battle Groups of the Pentomic Division had proved to be unwieldy, and it was felt that their span of control was not sufficient to handle all of the various units and troops assigned to their command. The army reverted to the infantry battalion as the basic building block and provided for additional command and control by providing a brigade headquarters. The 1st and 2nd Brigade, 39th Division were allocated to the Louisiana National Guard, while the 3rd Brigade was allocated to the Arkansas National Guard. The 153rd Infantry was reorganized to consist of the 1st, 2nd, and 3rd Battalions. The 1st Battalion, 206th Field Artillery was deactivated and the 3rd Battalion, 142nd Field Artillery was added to the 39th Division Artillery. The 3rd Battalion, 142nd Field Artillery had previously been under the command and control of the 142nd Field Artillery Group. The 3rd Battalion, 206th Field Artillery was reduced to one Honest John Rocket Battery, Battery A. The 206th Armor was expanded to consist of the 1st and 2nd Battalion, 206th Armor Regiment. These changes, which were implemented on 1 May 1963, cause another massive restationing of units around the state:

New Unit	Former Unit	Station
HQ and HQ Company (Part), 39th Inf Div	HQ and HQ Company (Part), 39th Inf Div	Little Rock
Company A, 39th Aviation Company	39th Aviation Company	Little Rock
HQ and HQ Company, 3rd Brigade, 39th Infantry Division	Company C, 2nd Battle Group, 153rd Infantry	Little Rock
HQ and HQ Company, (-Ground Surveillance Sec, BN Recon, BN Mortar & Davy Crockett, & BN Anti-Tank Platoon), 1st Battalion, 153rd Infantry	HQ and HQ Company, 1st Battle Group, 153rd Infantry	Malvern
Det 1, HQ and HQ Company, (Ground Surveillance Sec, BN Recon, BN Mortar & Davy Crockett, & BN Anti-Tank Platoon), 1st Battalion, 153rd Infantry	Combat Support Company, 1st Battle Group, 153rd Infantry	Mena
Company A, 1st Battalion, 153rd Infantry	Company D, 1st Battle Group, 153rd Infantry	Arkadelphia
Company B (−2nd Rifle and Weapons Platoon), 1st Battalion, 153rd Infantry	Company B, 1st Battle Group, 153rd Infantry	Texarkana
Det 1, Company B (2nd Rifle and Weapons Platoon), 1st Battalion, 153rd Infantry	Company A,(Platoon), 1st Battalion, 153rd Infantry	Hope
Company C, 1st Battalion, 153rd Infantry	Company C, 1st Battle Group, 153rd Infantry	Prescot
HQ and HQ Company, (-Ground Surveillance Sec, BN Recon, BN Mortar & Davy Crockett, & BN Anti-Tank Platoon), 2nd Battalion, 153rd Infantry	HQ and HQ Company, 2nd Battle Group, 153rd Infantry	Searcy
Det 1, HQ and HQ Company, (Ground Surveillance Sec, BN Recon, BN Mortar & Davy Crockett, & BN Anti-Tank Platoon), 2nd Battalion, 153rd Infantry	Combat Support Company, 2nd Battle Group	Newport
Company A, 2nd Battalion, 153rd Infantry	Company A, 2nd Battle Group	Walnut Ridge
Company B, 2nd Battalion, 153rd Infantry	Company B, 2nd Battle Group	Batesville
Company C, 2nd Battalion, 153rd Infantry	Company D, 2nd Battle Group	Conway
HQ and HQ Company, (Minus Ground Surveillance Sec. HQ Tank Sec, BN Armd Cav, BN Mortar & Davy Crocket Platoon, Armored Vehicle Launched Bridge Section, 1st Battalion, 206th Armor	1st Medium Tank BN (Patton), 206th Armor	Warren
Det 1, HQ and HQ Company, (Ground Surveillance Sec. HQ Tank Sec, BN Armd Cav, BN Mortar & Davy Crocket Platoon, Armored Vehicle Launched Bridge Section, 1st Battalion, 206th Armor	Company E, 1st Battle Group, 153rd Infantry	Magnolia
Company A, 1st Battalion, 206th Armor	Company A, 1st Medium Tank BN (Patton), 206th Armor	El Dorado
Company B, 1st Battalion, 206th Armor	Company B, 1st Medium Tank BN (Patton), 206th Armor	Camden
Company C, 1st Battalion, 206th Armor	Company D, 1st Medium Tank BN (Patton), 206th Armor	Crossett
HQ and HQ Company, (Minus Ground Surveillance Sec. HQ Tank Sec, BN Armd Cav, BN Mortar & Davy Crocket Platoon, Armored Vehicle Launched Bridge Section, 2nd Battalion, 206th Armor	HQ and HQ Battery, 1st How Bn (105mm/155mm), 206th Arty	Pine Bluff
Det 1, HQ and HQ Company, (Ground Surveillance Sec. HQ Tank Sec, BN Armd Cav, BN Mortar & Davy Crocket Platoon, Armored Vehicle Launched Bridge Section, 2nd Battalion, 206th Armor	Battery A (105mm), 1st How Bn, 206th Arty	Sheridan
Company A, 2nd Battalion, 206th Armor	Company E, 1st Medium Tank BN (Patton), 206th Armor	McGehee
Company B, 2nd Battalion, 206th Armor	Battery B (155mm), 1st How Bn, 206th Arty	Dumas
Company C, 2nd Battalion, 206th Armor	Company C, 1st Medium Tank BN (Patton), 206th Armor	Fordyce
HQ and HQ Company 217th Engr BN	HQ and HQ Company 217th Engr BN	Russellville
Company A, 217th Engr BN	Company E, 217th Engr BN	Clarksville
Company B, 217th Engr BN	Company B, 217th Engr BN	Dardanelle
Company C, 217th Engr BN	Company C, 217th Engr BN	Danville
Company D, 217th Engr BN	Company E, 2nd Battle Group	Morrilton
Company E, 217th Engr BN	Company A, 217th Engr BN	Russellville
HQ and HQ Battery, 39th Inf Div Artillery (Part)	HQ and HQ Battery, 39th Inf Div Artillery	Little Rock
HQ and HQ Service Battery, 3rd Battalion, (105mm)(Towed) 142nd Artillery	HQ and HQ Battery, 3rd Battalion, 142nd Artillery	Harrison
Battery A, 3rd Battalion, (155mm)(Towed) 142nd Artillery	Battery A, 3rd Battalion, (105mm)(Towed) 142nd Artillery	Mountain Home
Battery B, 3rd Battalion, (105mm)(Towed) 142nd Artillery	Battery B, 3rd Battalion, (155mm)(Towed) 142nd Artillery	Berryville
Battery C, 3rd Battalion, (105mm)(Towed) 142nd Artillery	Battery C, 3rd Battalion, (155mm)(Towed) 142nd Artillery	Springdale
HQ and HQ Battery, 2nd Battalion (105mm) (Towed), 206th Artillery	HQ and HQ Battery, 2nd Howitzer Battalion, (105/155mm)(Towed), 206th Artillery	Hazen
Battery A (105mm)(Towed), 2nd How Bn, 206th Artillery	Battery A (155mm)(Towed), 2nd How Bn, 206th Artillery	Augusta
Battery B (105mm)(Towed), 2nd How Bn, 206th Artillery	Battery B (155mm)(Towed), 2nd How Bn, 206th Artillery	Brnkley
Battery C (105mm)(Towed), 2nd How Bn, 206th Artillery	Battery B (Honest John), 3rd Rocket Howitzer Battalion, 206th Artillery	West Helena
HQ and HQ Battery, 3rd Battalion, 206th Artillery (Honest John)	HQ and HQ Battery, 3rd Rocket Howitzer (HJ / 8in) Battalion, 206th Artillery	Marianna
Battery A (Honest John Rocket)(SP), 3rd Rkt How BN, 206th Artillery	Battery A (8 in), 3rd Rkt How BN, 206th Artillery	Helena
HQ and HQ Company (Minus Band), 39th Infantry Division Support Command	HQ and HQ Detachment (Minus Band), 39th Infantry Division TN	Little Rock
39th Admin Co(Part)	39th Admin Co(Part)	Little Rock
HQ and Company A (SPT), 125th Med BN	HQ and HQ Det, 125th Med BN, Company B (Cir), 125th Med BN,	Little Rock
Company B, 125th Med BN	Company A (AMB), 125th Med BN	Lonoke
Company C, 125th Med BN	219th Ambulance Company	DeWitt
HQ and Company A (Main Support) (Minus Services and Evacuation Platoon, 4th Mechanic Section & Armament Maintenance Platoon), 739th Ordnance Battalion	HQ and Company A, 739th Ordnance Battalion	Little Rock
Det 1, HQ and Company A (Services and Evacuation Platoon, 4th Mechanic Section & Armament Maintenance Platoon), 739th Ordnance Battalion	Company D, 217th Engineer Battalion	Perryville
Company B (Forward Support), 739th Ordnance Battalion	Company B (Forward Support), 739th Ordnance Battalion	Pine Bluff
Company C (Forward Support), 739th Ordnance Battalion	Service Battery, 3rd Battalion, 142nd Artillery,	Marshall
State Headquarters Detachment	State Headquarters Detachment	Little Rock
HQ and HQ Battery, 142nd Artillery Group (With Aviation Section)	HQ and HQ Battery, 142nd Artillery Group	Fayetteville
HQ and HQ Battery, 1st Battalion, (155mm)(Towed) 142nd Artillery(With Aviation Section)	HQ and HQ Battery, 1st Battalion, (155mm)(Towed) 142nd Artillery	Fayetteville
Battery A, 1st Battalion, (155mm)(Towed) 142nd Artillery	Battery A, 1st Battalion, (155mm)(Towed) 142nd Artillery	Bentonville
Battery B, 1st Battalion, (155mm)(Towed) 142nd Artillery	Battery B, 1st Battalion, (155mm)(Towed) 142nd Artillery	Siloam Springs
Battery C, 1st Battalion, (155mm)(Towed) 142nd Artillery	Battery C, 1st Battalion, (155mm)(Towed) 142nd Artillery	Rogers
Service Battery, 1st Battalion, (155mm)(Towed) 142nd Artillery	Service Battery, 1st Battalion, (155mm)(Towed) 142nd Artillery	Lincoln
HQ and HQ Battery, 2nd Battalion, (8 inch)(SP) 142nd Artillery	HQ and HQ Battery, 2nd Battalion, (8 inch)(SP) 142nd Artillery	Fort Smith
Battery A, 2nd Battalion, (8 inch)(SP) 142nd Artillery	Battery A, 2nd Battalion, (8 inch)(SP) 142nd Artillery	Van Buren
Battery B, 2nd Battalion, (8 inch)(SP) 142nd Artillery	Battery B, 2nd Battalion, (8 inch)(SP) 142nd Artillery	Paris
Battery C, 2nd Battalion, (8 inch)(SP) 142nd Artillery	Battery C, 2nd Battalion, (8 inch)(SP) 142nd Artillery	Ozark
Service Battery, 2nd Battalion, (8 inch)(SP) 142nd Artillery	Service Battery, 2nd Battalion, (8 inch)(SP) 142nd Artillery	Charleston
HQ and HQ Battery, 4th Battalion, (8 inch)(SP) 142nd Artillery	HQ and HQ Battery, 4th Battalion, (8 inch)(SP) 142nd Artillery	Paragould
Battery A, 4th Battalion, (8 inch)(SP) 142nd Artillery	Battery A, 4th Battalion, (8 inch)(SP) 142nd Artillery	Marked Tree
Battery B, 4th Battalion, (8 inch)(SP) 142nd Artillery	Battery B, 4th Battalion, (8 inch)(SP) 142nd Artillery	Blytheville
Battery C, 4th Battalion, (8 inch)(SP) 142nd Artillery	Battery C, 4th Battalion, (8 inch)(SP) 142nd Artillery	Piggott
Service Battery, 4th Battalion, (8 inch)(SP) 142nd Artillery	Service Battery, 4th Battalion, (8 inch)(SP) 142nd Artillery	Rector
HQ and HQ Battery, 5th Battalion, (105mm)(Towed) 142nd Artillery (With Aviation Section)	HQ and HQ Battery, 5th Battalion, (155mm)(SP) 142nd Artillery	West Memphis
Battery A, 5th Battalion, (105mm)(Towed) 142nd Artillery	Battery A, 5th Battalion, (155mm)(SP) 142nd Artillery	Wynne
Battery B, 5th Battalion, (105mm)(Towed) 142nd Artillery	Battery B, 5th Battalion, (155mm)(SP) 142nd Artillery	Forrest City
Battery C, 5th Battalion, (105mm)(Towed) 142nd Artillery	Battery C, 5th Battalion, (155mm)(SP) 142nd Artillery	Augusta
Service Battery, 5th Battalion, (105mm)(SP) 142nd Artillery	Service Battery, 5th Battalion, (155mm)(SP) 142nd Artillery	West Memphis
Headquarters and Headquarters Service Company (Combat), 875th Engineer Battalion	Headquarters and Headquarters Service Company (Construction), 875th Engineer Battalion	Jonesboro
Company A, 875th Engineer Battalion (Combat)	Company A, 875th Engineer Battalion (Construction)	Jonesboro
Company B, 875th Engineer Battalion (Combat)	Company B, 875th Engineer Battalion (Construction)	Jonesboro
Company C, 875th Engineer Battalion (Combat)	Company D, 875th Engineer Battalion (Construction)	Jonesboro
Headquarters and Headquarters Company, 212th Signal Battalion (Combat Area) (Army)	Headquarters and Headquarters Company, 212th Signal Battalion (Combat Area) (Army)	Little Rock
Company A, 212th Signal Battalion (Combat Area) (Army)	Company A, 212th Signal Battalion (Combat Area) (Army)	Hot Springs
Company B, 212th Signal Battalion (Combat Area) (Army)	Company B, 212th Signal Battalion (Combat Area) (Army)	Benton
Company C, 212th Signal Battalion (Combat Area) (Army)	Company C, 212th Signal Battalion (Combat Area) (Army)	Pine Bluff
Company D, 212th Signal Battalion (Combat Area) (Army)	Company D, 212th Signal Battalion (Combat Area) (Army)	Little Rock
Headquarters and Headquarters Detachment, 101st Medical Battalion	Headquarters and Headquarters Detachment, 101st Medical Battalion (Sep)	Booneville
216th Medical Company (Clearing)	216th Medical Company	Lake Village
295th Medical Company (Holding)	295th Medical Company (Holding)	Dermontt
296th Medical Company (Armored)	296th Medical Company (Holding)	Booneville
204th Medical Company (Dental Services)(KJ)	204th Medical Company (Dental Services)(KJ)	Little Rock
148th Evacuation Hospital (with Prof Comp)	148th Evacuation Hospital	Little Rock
172nd Engineer Company (Maintenance)(DS)	172nd Engineer Company (Maintenance)(DS)	Herber Springs
176th Ordnance Company (DS)	176th Ordnance Company (DS)	Little Rock
404th Ordnance Company (Direct Automotive Support)	404th Ordnance Company (General Automotive Support)	Monticello
106th Army Band (28 Piece)	106th Army Band (Sep)	Little Rock
1121st Transportation Company (Light Truck)	Company A, 1st Battle Group, 153rd Infantry	Dequeen
222nd Engineer Company (Dump Truck)	Company C, 875th Engineer Battalion	Stuttgart

== Reorganization of 1967 ==
During the 1960s, the Department of Defense continued to scrutinize the reserve forces. It questioned the number of divisions and brigades, as well as the redundancy of maintaining two reserve components, the National Guard and the Army Reserve. In 1967, Secretary of Defense Robert McNamara decided that 15 combat divisions in the Army National Guard were unnecessary. He cut the number to eight divisions (one mechanized infantry, two armored, and five infantry), but increased the number of brigades from seven to 18 (one airborne, one armored, two mechanized infantry, and 14 infantry). The loss of the divisions did not set well with the states. Their objections included the inadequate maneuver element mix for those that remained and the end to the practice of rotating divisional commands among the states that supported them. Under the proposal, the remaining division commanders were to reside in the state of the division base. No reduction, however, in total Army National Guard strength was to take place, which convinced the governors to accept the plan. The states reorganized their forces accordingly between 1 December 1967 and 1 May 1968.

On 2 November 1967, the Arkansas portion of the 39th Division was reorganized and redesignated as the 39th Infantry Brigade. This change and significant changes in the 142nd Artillery Group (Loss of 3rd, 4th and 5th Battalions) resulted in a massive restationing within the state as follows:

New Unit	Former Unit	Station
State Headquarters Detachment	State Headquarters Detachment	Little Rock
HQ and HQ Company, Emergency Operations Headquarters, Arkansas Army National Guard.	New Unit	Little Rock
HQ and HQ Company (w/CA Sec Aug), 39th Infantry Brigade (Sep)	HQ and HQ Company (Part), 39th Inf Div	Little Rock
Troop E, 151st CAV	Company C, 2nd Battalion, 153rd Infantry	Conway
239th Engineer Company (Minus Equipment Maint Section, Bridge Platoon, and 2nd Engineer Platoon)	Company A, 217th Engr BN	Clarksville
Det 1, 239th Engineer Company (Equipment Maint Section, Bridge Platoon, and 2nd Engineer Platoon)	Company E, 217th Engr BN	Russellville
39th Aviation Company	Company A, 39th Aviation Battalion, and HQ and Company A, 739th Maintenance Battalion	North Little Rock
HQ and HQ Detachment, 39th Support Battalion	HQ and HQ Battery, 2nd Battalion (105mm) (Towed), 206th Artillery	Hazen
Company A (Admin) (with IG, Postal Division, Replacement Detachment, Chaplin Section), 39th Support Battalion	39th Admin Company (Minus), & Headquarters and Headquarters Company, 39th Infantry Division Support Command	Little Rock
Company B (Medical) (Minus Clearing Platoon), 39th Support Battalion	Company B, 125th Med BN	Lonoke
Det 1, Company B (Medical) (Clearing Platoon), 39th Support Battalion	Company C, 125th Med BN	DeWitt
Company C (S&T) (Minus Petroleum Platoon, FLD SVC Platoon and General Transportation Platoon), 39th Support Battalion	222nd Engineer Company (Dump Truck)	Stuttgart
Det 1, Company C (S&T) (Petroleum Platoon, FLD SVC Platoon and General Transportation Platoon), 39th Support Battalion	New Unit	Hazen
Company D (Maintenance) (Minus Mech Maint Platoon HQ, Armament Maintenance Section, 4 Mobile Maintenance Section), 39th Support Battalion	176th Ordnance Company (DS)	Little Rock
Det 1, Company D (Maintenance)(Mech Maint Platoon HQ, Armament Maintenance Section, 4 Mobile Maintenance Section), 39th Support Battalion	Det 1, HQ and Company A, 739th Ordnance Battalion	Perryville
HQ and HQ Service Battery (Minus Radar Section, Metro Section, Communications Platoon, 5th Battalion, 206th Artillery	HQ and HQ Battery, 5th Battalion, (105mm)(Towed) 142nd Artillery (With Aviation Section) & Service Battery, 5th Battalion, (105mm)(SP) 142nd Artillery	West Memphis
Det 1, HQ and HQ Service Battery (Radar Section, Metro Section, Communications Platoon, 5th Battalion, 206th Artillery	HQ and HQ Battery, 3rd Battalion, 206th Artillery (Honest John)	Marianna
Battery A, 5th Battalion, (105mm)(Towed) 206th Artillery	Battery A, 5th Battalion, (105mm)(Towed) 142nd Artillery	Wynne
Battery B, 5th Battalion, (105mm)(Towed) 206th Artillery	Battery B, 5th Battalion, (105mm)(Towed) 142nd Artillery	Forrest City
Battery C, 5th Battalion, (105mm)(Towed) 206th Artillery	Battery C, 5th Battalion, (105mm)(Towed) 142nd Artillery	Harrisburg
HQ and HQ Company, (Minus BN Recon, BN Mortar, 3 Company Mess Teams, BN Maintenance Platoon, Battalion Medical Platoon, plus chaplain and Personnel Section), 1st Battalion, 153rd Infantry	HQ and HQ Company, 1st Battalion, 153rd Infantry	Malvern
Det 1, HQ and HQ Company, (BN Recon and BN Mortar), 1st Battalion, 153rd Infantry	Det 1, HQ and HQ Company, (Ground Surveillance Sec. HQ Tank Sec, BN Scout Platoon, BN Mortar, Armored Vehicle Launched Bridge Section, 2nd Battalion, 206th Armor	Sheridan
Det 2, HQ and HQ Company, (BN Maintenance Platoon, Battalion Medical Platoon), 1st Battalion, 153rd Infantry	HQ and HQ Company, (Minus Ground Surveillance Sec. HQ Tank Sec, BN Armd Cav, BN Mortar & Davy Crocket Platoon, Armored Vehicle Launched Bridge Section, 2nd Battalion, 206th Armor	Pine Bluff
Company A, (Minus 2nd and 3rd Rifle Platoons, plus Company Mess Team) 1st Battalion, 153rd Infantry	Company C, 1st Battalion, 153rd Infantry	Prescot
Det 1, Company A (2nd and 3rd Rifle Platoons), 1st Battalion, 153rd Infantry	Company A, 1st Battalion, 153rd Infantry	Arkadelphia
Company B(Minus 2nd Rifle and 3rd Rifle Platoons, Plus Company Mess Team), 1st Battalion, 153rd Infantry	Company B(−2nd Rifle and Weapons Platoon), 1st Battalion, 153rd Infantry	Texarkana
Det 1, Company B(2nd Rifle and 3rd Rifle Platoons), 1st Battalion, 153rd Infantry	Det 1, Company B(2nd Rifle Platoon and Weapons Platoon), 1st Battalion, 153rd Infantry	Hope
Company C, (Minus 2nd and 3rd Rifle Platoons, Plus Company Mess Team), 1st Battalion, 153rd Infantry	Det 1, HQ and HQ Company, (Ground Surveillance Sec, BN Recon, BN Mortar, & BN Anti-Tank Platoon), 1st Battalion, 153rd Infantry	Mena
Det 1, Company C, (2nd and 3rd Rifle Platoons), 1st Battalion, 153rd Infantry	1121st Transportation Company (Light Truck)	Dequeen
HQ and HQ Company, (Minus Ground Surveillance Section, BN Recon, BN Mortar & BN Medical Platoon), 2nd Battalion, 153rd Infantry	HQ and HQ Company, (Minus Ground Surveillance Section, BN Recon, BN Mortar & BN Anti-Tank Platoon), 2nd Battalion, 153rd Infantry	Searcy
Det 1, HQ and HQ Company, (BN Mortar, BN Medical Platoon), 2nd Battalion, 153rd Infantry	Det 1, HQ and HQ Company, (Ground Surveillance Sec, BN Recon, BN Mortar & Davy Crockett, & BN Anti-Tank Platoon), 2nd Battalion, 153rd Infantry	Newport
Det 2, HQ and HQ Company, (Ground Surveillance Sec, BN Recon, BN Anti-Tank Platoon), 2nd Battalion, 153rd Infantry	HQ and HQ Company, 3rd Brigade, 39th Infantry Division	Beebe
Company A (Minus 2nd and 3rd Rifle Platoons, Plus Company Mess Team), 2nd Battalion, 153rd Infantry	Company A, 2nd Battalion, 153rd Infantry	Walnut Ridge
Det 1, Company A (2nd and 3rd Rifle Platoons), 2nd Battalion, 153rd Infantry	Battery C, 4th Battalion, (8 inch)(SP) 142nd Artillery	Piggott
Company B (Minus 2nd and 3rd Rifle Platoons, Plus Company Mess Team), 2nd Battalion, 153rd Infantry	Company B, 2nd Battalion, 153rd Infantry	Batesville
Det 1, Company B (2nd and 3rd Rifle Platoons), 2nd Battalion, 153rd Infantry	Battery A, 2nd Battalion, 206th Artillery	Augusta
Company C (Minus 2nd and 3rd Rifle Platoons and Weapons Platoon, Plus Company Mess Team), 2nd Battalion, 153rd Infantry	Battery B, 2nd Battalion, 206th Artillery	Brinkley
Det 1, Company C (2nd Rifle Platoon), 2nd Battalion, 153rd Infantry	Battery A (Honest John Rocket)(SP), 3rd Rkt How BN, 206th Artillery	Helena
Det 2, Company C (3rd Rifle Platoon), 2nd Battalion, 153rd Infantry	Battery C (105mm)(Towed) 2nd Battalion, 206th Artillery	West Helena
HQ and HQ Company, (Minus Ground Surveillance Sec. BN Recon, BN Mortar Platoon, BN Anti Tank Platoon, Battalion Medical Platoon and 3 Company Mess Teams), 3rd Battalion, 153rd Infantry	HQ and HQ Company, (Minus Ground Surveillance Sec. HQ Tank Sec, BN Armd Cav, BN Mortar & Davy Crocket Platoon, Armored Vehicle Launched Bridge Section, 1st Battalion, 206th Armor	Warren
Det 1, HQ and HQ Company, (BN Recon, BN Mortar Platoon), 3rd Battalion, 153rd Infantry	Det 1, HQ and HQ Company, 1st Battalion, 206th Armor	Magnolia
Det 2, HQ and HQ Company, (Ground Surveillance Sec. BN Anti Tank Platoon, Battalion Medical Platoon ), 3rd Battalion, 153rd Infantry	295th Medical Company (Holding)	Dermontt
Company A (Minus 2nd and 3rd Rifle Platoons, Plus Company Mess Team), 3rd Battalion, 153rd Infantry	Company A, 1st Battalion, 206th Armor	El Dorado
Det 1, Company A (2nd and 3rd Rifle Platoons), 3rd Battalion, 153rd Infantry	Company C, 1st Battalion, 206th Armor	Crossett
Company B (Minus 2nd and 3rd Rifle Platoons, Plus Company Mess Team), 3rd Battalion, 153rd Infantry	Company C, 2nd Battalion, 206th Armor	Fordyce
Det 1, Company B (2nd and 3rd Rifle Platoons), 3rd Battalion, 153rd Infantry	Company B, 1st Battalion, 206th Armor	Camden
Company C (Minus 2nd and 3rd Rifle Platoons, Plus Company Mess Team), 3rd Battalion, 153rd Infantry	Company A, 2nd Battalion, 206th Armor	McGehee
Det 1, Company C (2nd and 3rd Rifle Platoons), 3rd Battalion, 153rd Infantry	Company B, 2nd Battalion, 206th Armor	Dumas
HQ and HQ Battery, 142nd Artillery Group (With Aviation Section)	HQ and HQ Battery, 142nd Artillery Group	Fayetteville
HQ and HQ Battery (Minus LN Section, Commo Platoon, and AVN Section), 2nd Battalion, (8 inch)(SP) 142nd Artillery	HQ and HQ Battery, 2nd Battalion, (8 inch)(SP) 142nd Artillery	Fort Smith
Det 1, HQ and HQ Battery (LN Section, Commo Platoon, and AVN Section), 2nd Battalion, (8 inch)(SP) 142nd Artillery	Service Battery, 2nd Battalion, (8 inch)(SP) 142nd Artillery	Charleston
Battery A, 2nd Battalion, (8 inch)(SP) 142nd Artillery	Battery A, 2nd Battalion, (8 inch)(SP) 142nd Artillery	Van Buren
Battery B, 2nd Battalion, (155mm)(Towed) 142nd Artillery	Battery B, 1st Battalion, (155mm)(Towed) 142nd Artillery	Siloam Springs
Battery C, 2nd Battalion, (8 inch)(SP) 142nd Artillery	Battery C, 2nd Battalion, (8 inch)(SP) 142nd Artillery	Ozark
Service Battery, 2nd Battalion, (8 inch)(SP) 142nd Artillery	Service Battery, 1st Battalion, (155mm)(Towed) 142nd Artillery	Lincoln
HQ and HQ Battery (Minus Battery HQ, Admins Section, Survey Section, LN Section, and Medical Section), 1st Battalion, (105mm)(Towed) 142nd Artillery	HQ and HQ Service Battery, 3rd Battalion, (105mm)(Towed) 142nd Artillery	Harrison
Det 1, HQ and HQ Battery (Battery HQ, Admins Section, Survey Section, LN Section, and Medical Section), 1st Battalion, (105mm)(Towed) 142nd Artillery	HQ and HQ Battery, 1st Battalion, (155mm)(Towed) 142nd Artillery(With Aviation Section)	Fayetteville
Battery A, 1st Battalion, (105mm)(Towed) 142nd Artillery	Battery A, 1st Battalion, (155mm)(Towed) 142nd Artillery	Bentonville
Battery B, 1st Battalion, (105mm)(Towed) 142nd Artillery	Battery C, 3rd Battalion, (105mm)(Towed) 142nd Artillery	Springdale
Battery C, 1st Battalion, (105mm)(Towed) 142nd Artillery	Battery C, 1st Battalion, (155mm)(Towed) 142nd Artillery	Rogers
Service Battery, 1st Battalion, (105mm)(Towed) 142nd Artillery	Battery B, 3rd Battalion, (105mm)(Towed) 142nd Artillery	Berryville
Headquarters and Headquarters Company (With Aviation Aug), 212th Signal Battalion (Combat Area) (Army)	Headquarters and Headquarters Company, 212th Signal Battalion (Combat Area) (Army)	Little Rock
Company A (Minus Field Cable Installation Platoon), 212th Signal Battalion (Combat Area) (Army)	Company A, 212th Signal Battalion (Combat Area) (Army)	Hot Springs
Det 1, Company A (Field Cable Installation Platoon), 212th Signal Battalion (Combat Area)(Army)	Company C, 217th Engr BN	Danville
Company B, 212th Signal Battalion (Combat Area) (Army)	Company B, 212th Signal Battalion (Combat Area) (Army)	Benton
Company C, 212th Signal Battalion (Combat Area) (Army)	Company C, 212th Signal Battalion (Combat Area) (Army)	Pine Bluff
Company D, 212th Signal Battalion (Combat Area) (Army)	Company D, 212th Signal Battalion (Combat Area) (Army)	Little Rock
HQ and HQ Company (Minus Intel Section, Support Section, Commo Section, Equipment Section, and BN Medical Section, 875th Engineer Battalion (Combat)	Headquarters and Headquarters Service Company (Combat), 875th Engineer Battalion	Jonesboro
Det 1, HQ and HQ Company (Intel Section, Support Section, Commo Section, Equipment SEction, and BN Medical Section, 875th Engineer Battalion (Combat)	HQ and HQ Battery, 4th Battalion, (8 inch)(SP) 142nd Artillery	Paragould
Company A, 875th Engineer Battalion (Combat)	Company A, 875th Engineer Battalion (Combat)	Jonesboro
Company B, 875th Engineer Battalion (Combat)	Company B, 875th Engineer Battalion (Combat)	Jonesboro
Company C (Minus 2nd and 3rd Engineer Platoon), 875th Engineer Battalion (Combat)	Battery A, 4th Battalion, (8 inch)(SP) 142nd Artillery	Marked Tree
Det 1, Company C (2nd and 3rd Engineer Platoon), 875th Engineer Battalion (Combat)	Company C, 875th Engineer Battalion (Combat)	Jonesboro
Company D (Minus 2nd and 3rd Engineer Platoon), 875th Engineer Battalion (Combat)	Battery B, 4th Battalion, (8 inch)(SP) 142nd Artillery	Blytheville
Det 1, Company D (2nd and 3rd Engineer Platoon), 875th Engineer Battalion (Combat)	Service Battery, 4th Battalion, (8 inch)(SP) 142nd Artillery	Rector
HQ and HQ Det, 125th Med BN	HQ and Company A (SPT), 125th Med BN,	Little Rock
148th Evacuation Hospital (Minus Medical Service and Dental Service, with Prof Comp)(Semimobile)	148th Evacuation Hospital (with Prof Comp)	Little Rock
Det 1, 148th Evacuation Hospital (Medical Service and Dental Service, with Prof Comp)(Semimobile)	Headquarters and Headquarters Detachment, 101st Medical Battalion	Booneville
216th Medical Company (Ambulance)	216th Medical Company (Clearing)	Lake Village
296th Medical Company (Ambulance)	296th Medical Company (Armored)	Booneville
204th Medical Detachment (Dental Services)(KJ)	204th Medical Company (Dental Services)(KJ)	North Little Rock
HQ and HQ Detachment, 217th Maintenance Battalion	HQ and HQ Company 217th Engr BN	Russellville
176th Light Equipment Maintenance Company (GS)(Minus Shop Office, CM-QM Equipment Repair Platoon, Engineer Equipment Repair Platoon, and SP Equipment-ADP Section)	Company D, 217th Engr BN	Morrilton
Det 1, 176th Light Equipment Maintenance Company (GS)(Shop Office, CM-QM Equipment Repair Patoon, Engineer Equipment Repair Platoon, and SP Equipment-ADP Section)	Company B, 217th Engr BN	Dardanelle
172nd Heavy Equipment Maintenance Company(GS)	172nd Engineer Company (Maintenance)(DS)	Herber Springs
224th Light Maintenance Company (DS) (Minus Maintenance Platoon)	Battery A, 3rd Battalion, (155mm)(Towed) 142nd Artillery	Mountain Home
Det1, 224th Light Maintenance Company (DS) (Maintenance Platoon)	Company C (Forward Support), 739th Ordnance Battalion	Marshall
HQ and HQ Detachment, 455th Transportation Battalion	HQ and HQ Company, 2nd Battalion, 206th Armor	Pine Bluff
1122nd Transportation Company	404th Ordnance Company (Direct Automotive Support)	Monticello
1123rd Transportation Company	Battery B, 2nd Battalion, (8 inch)(SP) 142nd Artillery	Paris
106th Army Band (28 Piece)	106th Army Band (28 Piece)	Little Rock

1967 was the last whole sale reorganization of the Arkansas National Guard with virtually every unit being reorganized and restationed. Prior to 1967, reorganization and restationing occurred at the state level every few years (1946, 1959, 1964) After 1967 reorganizations and restationing occur much more often but involved fewer units on a yearly basis. This article will only refer to reorganizations after 1967 that affect a brigade or battalion headquarters.

== Creation of the State Area Command (STARC) ==
In 1983, National Guard Bureau, in Memorandum, NGB-ARO-0 207-02, Organizational Authority 27–83, authorized the creation of the State Area Command which incorporated the State Headquarters Detachment, the Command and Control Headquarters and the Camp Robinson Training Site.

New Unit	Former Unit	Station
Headquarters State Area Command, Arkansas Army National Guard	HQ and HQ Detachment, Arkansas Army National Guard	N. Little Rock
Det 1, Headquarters State Area Command, Arkansas Army National Guard	Command and Control Headquarters, Arkansas Army National Guard	N. Little Rock
Det 2, Headquarters State Area Command, Arkansas Army National Guard	Army National Guard Training Site, Camp Robinson	N. Little Rock
