= Arkansas Army National Guard in Operation Desert Storm =

The history of the Arkansas Army National Guard in Operation Desert Storm begins with the reorganization of the Arkansas Army National Guard following the end of the Cold War. The Arkansas Army National Guard had 13 units called into federal service during Operation Desert Shield/Desert Storm and the Arkansas Air National Guard had members of 10 units called up. More than 3,400 Arkansas Guard soldiers were called up, the second highest percentage of any state or territory. Four Arkansas units were deployed stateside or to Germany, the rest were deployed into the South West Asia Theater of Operations. The largest Arkansas unit deployed was the 142nd Field Artillery Brigade. Arkansas also deployed Medical, Maintenance, Transportation units along with a Rear Area Operations Center.

== Reorganization of 1989 ==
The Arkansas National Guard was authorized to organize the 1st Battalion, 233rd Air Defense Artillery effective 1 October 1989.

New Unit	Former Unit	Station
HQ and HQ Battery, 1st Battalion, 233rd ADA	Det 1, 148th Evacuation Hospital (Medical Service and Dental Service, with Prof Comp)(Semimobile)	Booneville
Battery A, 1st Battalion, 233rd ADA	Company D (Minus Det 1) (Maintenance), 39th Support Battalion	Morrilton
Battery B, 1st Battalion, 233rd ADA	1123rd Transportation Company	Paris
Battery C, 1st Battalion, 233rd ADA	Det 1, Company D (Minus Det 1) (Maintenance), 39th Support Battalion	Dardanelle

The 233rd ADA was assigned to the 142nd Field Artillery Brigade for administrative command and control, but wore the patch of the State Area Command.

== Operation Desert Storm Desert Shield ==
=== Units deployed to South West Asia ===
The 1122nd Transportation Company (Light-Medium Truck) was called into federal service 20 September 1990 and departed for Southwest Asia (SWA) 2 November 1990. The unit transported soldiers of the 82nd Airborne Division into Iraq during Operation Desert Storm. The 1122nd's truck drivers drove nearly 1 million miles in 7 months and earned the Meritorious Unit Commendation. It was released from federal service 4 June 1991.

The 216th Medical Company (Ambulance) was called into federal service 17 November 1990 and deployed to SWA 31 December 1990. While in SWA, the unit transported over 5,100 patients. It was selected as part of the residual force and was released from active duty 6 December 1991.

The Headquarters and Headquarters Battery, 1st and 2nd Battalions of the 142nd Field Artillery were called into federal service 21 November 1990 and deployed to SWA 16 January 1991. The 142nd and its subordinate units provided fire support to the 1st Infantry Division (US) and the 1st Armoured Division (UK), firing 1,060 rounds. The 2nd Battalion was released from federal service 21 May 1991, 1 May 22 and HHD 19 September.

The 148th Medical Hospital (Evacuation) was called into federal service 21 November 1990, deployed to SWA New Year's Eve, 1990. It provided general medical support to US and coalition forces, with priority to the 2nd Armored Cavalry Regiment. It also treated Iraqi soldiers. The 148th was released from federal service 6 May 1991.

The 224th Composite Service Company (Maintenance) was called into federal service 21 November 1990, deployed to SWA 12 January 1991 and provided support to units in the 16th Corps Support Group sector. It completed over 3,500 maintenance requests while in theater and was released from federal service 26 May 1991.

The Headquarters and Headquarters Detachment, 217th Maintenance Battalion was called into federal service 21 November 1990, deployed to SWA 28 December 1990. Assigned to VII Corps’ Support Command, the 217th provided command and control for eight maintenance companies and performed half of the vehicle maintenance and 95% of the communications equipment maintenance in the VII Corps area. It was released from active duty 17 May 1991. Two additional units were called into federal service 6 December 1990:

The 25th Rear Area Operations Center (RAOC) deployed to SWA 9 February 1991 and initially provided support to the XVIII Airborne Corps. Later the unit moved into Iraq with the 3rd Armored Cavalry Regiment. The 25th was released from federal service 6 June 1991.

=== Units Mobilized but not deployed to South West Asia ===
The 296th Medical Company was called into federal service 15 November 1990 and served at Fort Polk, LA. In addition to providing support to Fort Polk, the unit provided ambulance support to the Port of Entry at Camp Shelby - Hattiesburg, MS. It was released from federal service 30 June 1991. The 296th Medical Company was made up of some of the finest men and women during the tours for Desert Shield/ Storm. This Company consisted of four platoons (3 Medical and 1 maintenance/ cook/ supply Platoon) This Company consisted of two groups of three family members (a father and two sons) and (three brothers). Each family member was separated into different platoons.

The 119th Adjutant General Company (Personnel Services) was called into federal service 22 January 1991 and served at Fort Sill, OK. It provided personnel service support to soldiers mobilizing and demobilizing at Fort Sill and was released from active duty 15 June 1991.

The 204th Medical Detachment (Dental Services) deployed to Germany and provided dental services for several military communities. It was the only Army Guard dental unit called up, and was released from federal service 15 June 1991.

The 212th Signal Battalion was called into federal service 25 January 1991 and was validated for overseas service the week the war ended. It was released from federal service 26 March 1991.
