= Arkansas National Guard =

Coordinates: 34°48′55″N 92°17′19″W

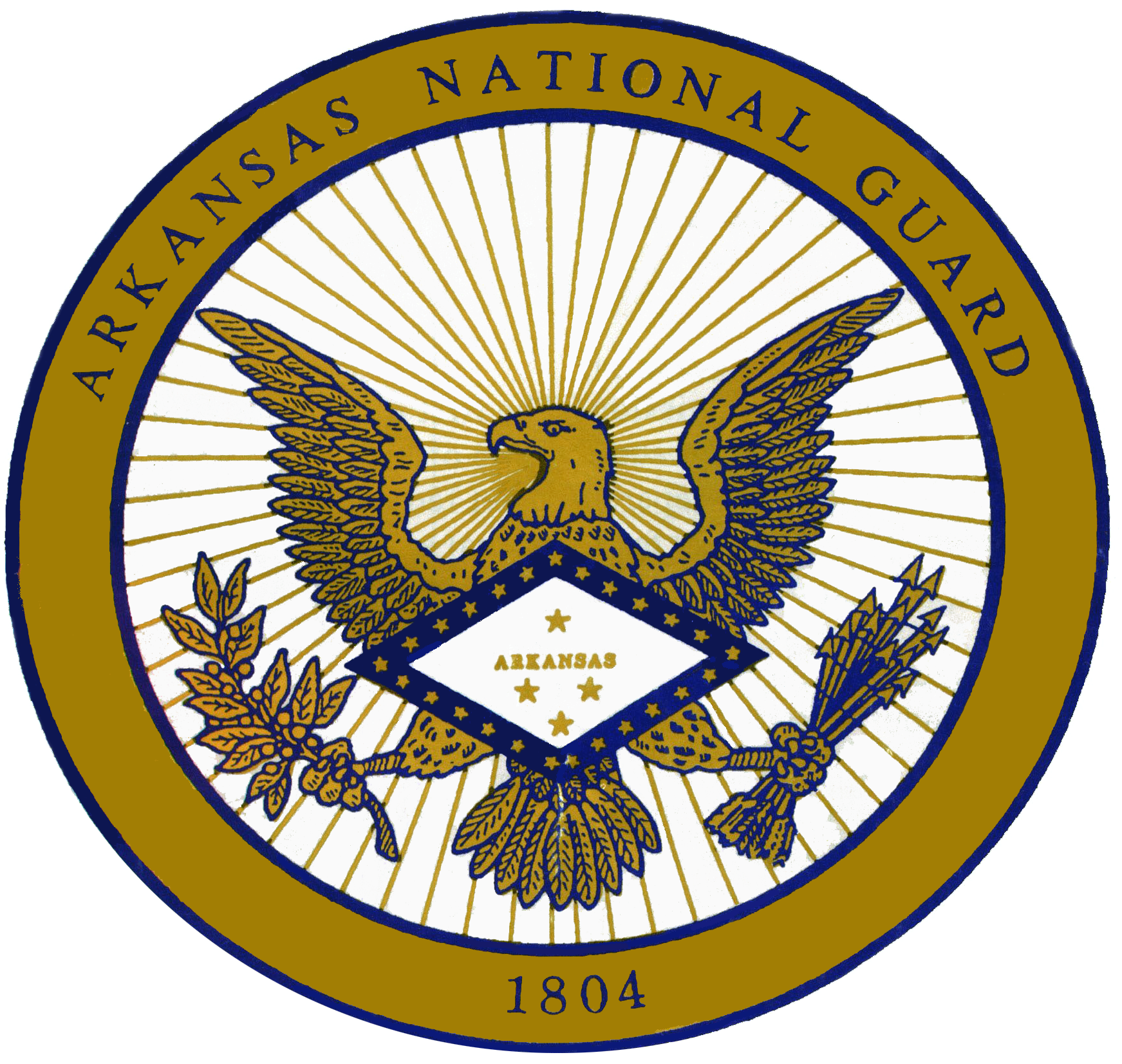
- Seal
- Active: 1804–present
- Country: United States
- Allegiance: Arkansas
- Type: National Guard
- Role: Organized militia Armed forces reserve
- Size: ~9,000 personnel
- Part of: Government of Arkansas; National Guard of the United States
- Headquarters: Camp Robinson MTC, North Little Rock, Arkansas
- Motto: "Arkansas First"
- Website: arkansas.nationalguard.mil

Commanders
- Commander in Chief: Governor Sarah Huckabee Sanders
- Adjutant General of Arkansas: Brig. Gen. Olen C. Bridges, ARARNG

Insignia
- Abbreviation: ARNG

The Arkansas National Guard (ARNG), commonly known as the Arkansas Guard, is a component of the government of Arkansas and the National Guard of the United States. It is composed of Army and Air National Guard units. The adjutant general's office is located at Camp Robinson MTC, North Little Rock.

== Dual missions, state and federal ==
National Guard units can be mobilized at any time by presidential order to supplement regular armed forces, and upon declaration of a state of emergency by the governor of the state in which they serve. Unlike Army Reserve members, National Guard members cannot be mobilized individually (except through voluntary transfers and Temporary DutY Assignments (TDY)), but only as part of their respective units. However, there have been several individual activations to support military operations since 2001.

=== Federal mission ===
When National Guard troops are called to federal service, the president serves as Commander-In-Chief. The federal mission assigned to the National Guard is: "To provide properly trained and equipped units for prompt mobilization for war, National emergency or as otherwise needed."' For much of the final decades of the 20th century, National Guard personnel typically served "one weekend a month, two weeks a year", with a portion working for the Guard in a full-time capacity. The current forces formation plans of the US Army call for the typical National Guard unit (or National Guardsman) to serve one year of active duty for every six years of service. More specifically, current Department of Defense policy is that individual Guardsman will be given 24 months between deployments of no more than 12 months each.

During the Little Rock School Crisis in 1957, President Eisenhower issued Executive Order 10730, which placed the Arkansas National Guard under Federal control. As of February 2023, the Executive Order 10730 has not been revoked.

=== State mission ===
The governor may call individuals or units of the Arkansas National Guard into state service during emergencies or to assist in special situations which lend themselves to use of the National Guard. The state mission assigned to the National Guard is: "To provide trained and disciplined forces for domestic emergencies or as otherwise provided by state law." When not activated for its federal mission, the governor through the State Adjutant General commands Guard forces. The governor can call the Guard into action during local or statewide emergencies, such as storms, drought, and civil disturbances, to name a few.

== Military support to civilian authorities (MSCA) ==
Upon the request of either the judge or sheriff of a county or the mayor of a city... ...whenever it is made to appear to the governor that there is a breach of the peace, riot, resistance to process of this State, or disaster or imminent danger thereof... ...the governor may order into the active service of the state... ...for such period, and to such extent, and in such manner as he may deem necessary, all or any part of the organized militia.

The intent is that the National Guard is called only when civilian resources have been used first and fully exhausted. While in this status, Guard units report only to military authorities, Guard Authorities do not replace Civilian Authorities. The use of the National Guard is intended as a temporary measure to prevent the loss of life or damage to property.

=== Examples of MSCA missions conducted in state active duty status ===
When tornados hit Dumas, Arkansas, on Saturday, February 24, 2007 the Arkansas National Guard deployed 130 Soldiers to conduct the following missions:

Security operations
Prevention of looting
Curfew enforcement
Power generation

In 2009 the Arkansas National Guard conducted over 101 MSCA missions, including:

Texas wildfires
Major ice storm – 81 missions
Mena tornado
Water purification to support the town of Dierks, Arkansas
H1N1 flu vaccinations

The types of missions that the Arkansas National Guard conducted in 2009 included:

Power generation
Emergency shelter
Cots and blankets
County disaster response teams (search and rescue, route clearance, debris removal)
Water provision

=== Examples of MSCA provided in a Title 32 status ===
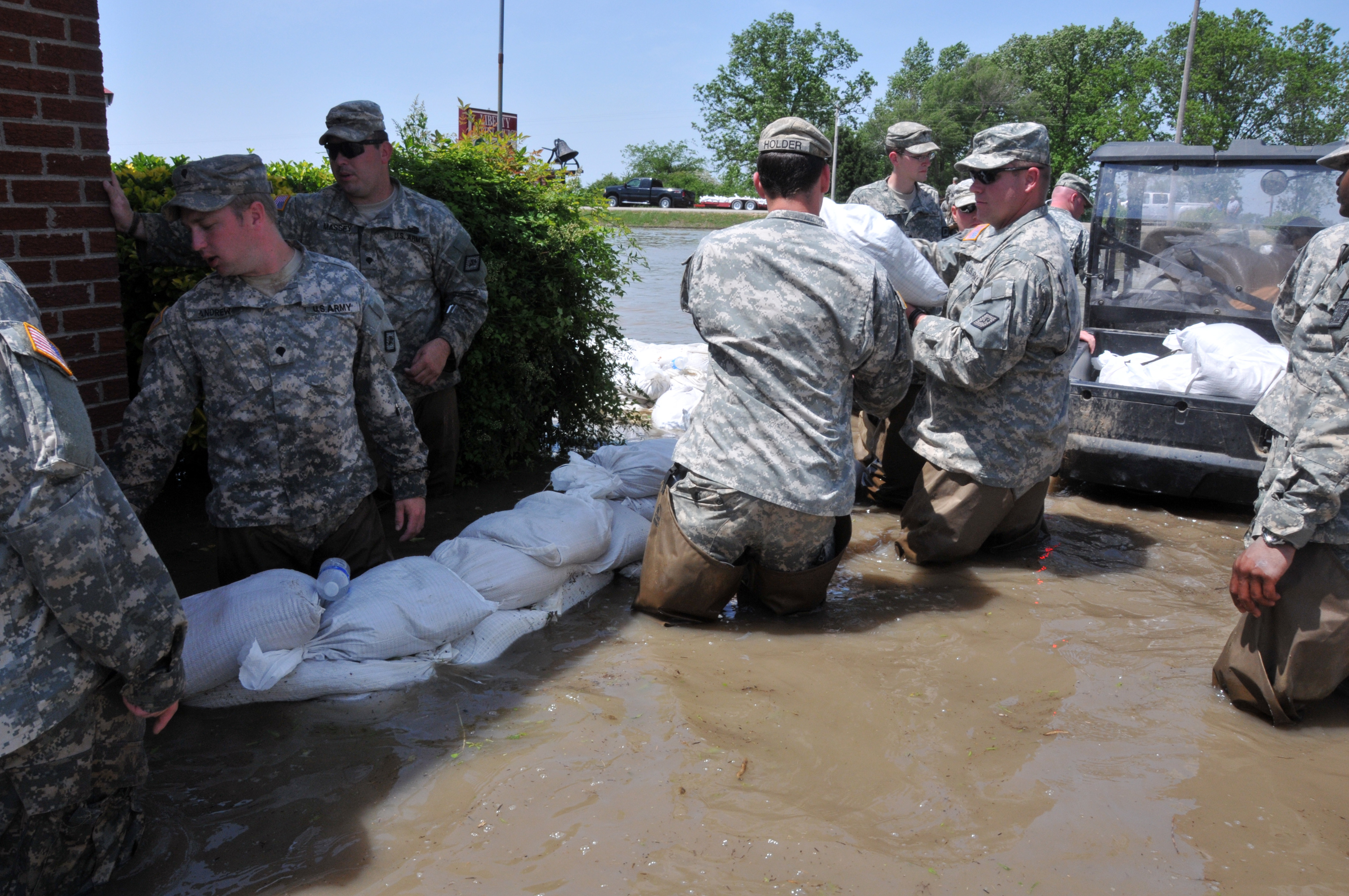
Arkansas National Guardsmen helping fight flood waters in the small community of Payneway, May 2011

The National Guard may also respond to natural disasters and other domestic operations in a Title 32 status. In this situation, the Guard is still under the direct command and control of the governor, but the federal government provides the funding through Title 32 of the United States Code.

==== Hurricane Katrina ====
The governor of Arkansas initially activated troops in a state active duty status in response to an Emergency Management Assistance Compact (EMAC) request from the governor of Louisiana. EMAC provides mutual aid across state lines, provides assets for states' personnel and equipment shortfalls, places responding assets under operational control of requesting governor and the Federal Emergency Management Agency (FEMA) recognizes cross-state support as reimbursable.

The Arkansas National Guard provided the first guard units from outside Louisiana to respond to the Louisiana governor's request for support when the 77th Theater Aviation Brigade deployed assets to New Orleans. A total of 3000 Arkansas National Guard Soldiers and Airmen were mobilized, with 1500 deployed to Louisiana at the peak of operations. The Arkansas National Guard assisted with processing over 10,000 evacuees through the Chaffee Maneuver Training Center (Fort Chaffee) at Fort Smith Arkansas. Arkansas National Guard units were among the last to leave Louisiana, finally handing off its missions to the Louisiana National Guard in February 2006.

==== Operation Jump Start ====
When President Bush ordered National Guard Troops to help secure the border with Mexico, the Arkansas National Guard responded with a Joint Task Force of Soldiers and Airmen, operating in Texas, New Mexico and Arizona. At its peak, Arkansas had over 230 Arkansas troops and airmen on orders including:

Arizona – 23 Airmen from the 188th Fighter Wing and 189th Air Lift Wing
New Mexico – 137 from 39th Infantry Brigade Combat Team and 87th Troop Command, ans 1 Airman from 188th Fighter Wing
Texas – 53 from the 77th Theater Aviation Brigade
Arkansas – 19 support personnel at the state Joint Operations Center and the Joint Forces Headquarters

== State military facilities ==
The Arkansas National Guard operates over 70 National Guard Readiness Centers (traditionally referred to as Armories) in 55 Arkansas Counties. The state also maintains two Maneuver Training Centers, Chaffee Maneuver Training Center at Fort Smith, Arkansas, and Camp Robinson Maneuver Training Center at North Little Rock, Arkansas.

=== Fort Chaffee Maneuver Training Center ===
The Chaffee Maneuver Training Center (Fort Chaffee) encompasses over 65,000 acres, large enough to support Brigade size training exercises, or up to approximately 7000 soldiers. Acreage available to support Field Artillery training as well as various small arms training ranges. A recent addition to Fort Chaffee is the convoy live fire range to meet the latest training requirement of the Global War On Terrorism. Fort Chaffee became a center for processing hurricane evacuees, providing shelter and relief to over 10,000 Citizens of Louisiana during Hurricanes Katrina and Rita.

=== Camp Robinson Maneuver Training Center ===
The Camp Robinson Maneuver Training Center (Camp Joseph T, Robinson) is a 32,000 Acre facility located at North Little Rock, Arkansas, which houses the Joint Forces Headquarters, Arkansas National Guard, the Headquarters, Arkansas Air National Guard, Headquarters, 77th Combat Aviation Brigade, Headquarters, 87th Troop Command, and is home to 3 Premier Training Centers, the National Guard Professional Education Center (PEC), the Guard Marksmanship Training Center (NGMTC) and the 233rd Regional Training Institute.

== Manpower ==
As of 2009, the Arkansas National Guard Consisted of 10,582 Soldiers and Airmen. 8,750 of these Soldiers and Airmen are considered traditional members, meaning that they are required to drill at least one weekend per month and 2 weeks per year, but often work more. The Arkansas National Guard is supported by 1,836 full-time federal military employees and an additional 545 full-time state civilian employees.

== State Military Department ==
The Arkansas State Military Department supports the Arkansas Guard by providing responsible fiscal, administrative, nursing, security, youth service, family support, natural resource conservation, recycling, waste water, public affairs, legal, museum, fire, police officers, skilled trades, and trained professional staff that will ensure well-maintained armories, facilities, training, and personnel administration for the National Guard.

== Youth programs ==
The Arkansas National Guard Operates two programs to assist at-risk youth.

=== Youth Challenge ===
The Arkansas National Guard Youth Challenge program is a 22-week residential program for at-risk youth ages 16–19. In 2009 the program graduated 109 cadets. Of that number 71 earned a GED or a high school diploma. Twelve graduates of the program joined the military and six enrolled in college. The Cadets perform community service at numerous events, such as the Arkansas Susan G. Komen Race for the Cure against breast cancer.

=== Civilian Student Training Program ===
Civilian Student Training Program is a state funded program that provides a structured, discipline base and military style, behavior modification environment. the program accepts adjudicated male nonviolent offenders ranging in age from 13 to 17. The nine-week residential multi-phase program stresses value-based learning, physical fitness, academic and life skills education, and community service. The program was proposed by the Arkansas National Guard and established by the state legislature in 1993. All participants are enrolled under court order. The program has graduated over 5,000 since its inception. The academic grade level increased of graduates increases by an average of 2.5 years. Over 25,000 hours of community service has been performed by CSTP graduates.

== Economic impact ==
The Arkansas National Guard's total operating budget for FY 2008 was, $244.8 million; of that, the federal government provided $232.4 million and the State of Arkansas provided $12.3 million in fiscal year 2008. There were also federal military construction projects related to the Arkansas National Guard totaling $83 million in fiscal year 2008.

County	City	Impact
Arkansas	City	$1,269,979
Ashley	Crossett	$714,035
Baxter	Mountain Home	$1,203,954
Benton	Bentonville	$921,755
Benton	Siloam Springs	$842,348
Benton	Rogers	$855,546
Boone	Harrison	$2,265.463
Bradley	Warren	$3,435,145
Carroll	Berryville	$674,586
Clark	Arkadelphia	$708,266
Clay	Rector	$1,340,758
Cleburne	Heber Springs	$1,130,293
Columbia	Magnolia	$1,466,699
Craighead	Jonesboro	$4,308,507
Crittenden	West Memphis	$909,426
Cross	Wynne	$23,320
Dallas	Fordyce	$589,634
Desha	Dumas	$1,285,005
Drew	Monticello	$1,296,634
Faulkner	Conway	$1,666,875
Franklin	Ozark	$869,503
Franklin	Charleston	$988,245
Garland	Hot Springs	$3,159,283
Greene	Paragould	$1,400,640
Hempstead	Hope	$700,683
Hot Springs	Malvern	$2,868,561
Independence	Batesville	$1,039,968
Jackson	Newport	$1,286,802
Jefferson	Pine Bluff	$3,762,741
Johnson	Clarksville	$1,031,235
Lawrence	Walnut Ridge	$625,606
Logan	Booneville	$1,645,150
Logan	Paris	$1,030,461
Lonoke	Lonoke	$605,157
Lonoke	Cabot	$513,329
Miller	Texarkana	$679,858
Mississippi	Blytheville	$846,821
Monroe	Brinkley	$658,596
Nevada	Prescott	$611,455
Ouachita	Camden	$705,243
Perry	Perryville	$561,727
Phillips	West Helena	$1,890,242
Poinsett	Harrisburg	$711,870
Poinsett	Marked Tree	$1,387,015
Polk	Mena	$641,656
Pope	Russellville	$3,539,263
Prairie	Hazen	$1,926,785
Pulaski	Little Rock	$3,183,860
Pulaski	North Little Rock	$103,632,033
Pulaski	Little Rock Air Force Base	$26,663,208
Saline	Benton	$1,416,622
Searcy	Marshall	$860,222
Sebastian	Fort Smith	$34,664,749
Sevier	DeQueen	$688,250
St Francis	Forrest City	$709,944
Union	El Dorado	$631,499
Washington	Fayetteville	$3,930,279
Washington	Lincoln	$739,739
Washington	Springdale	$928,628
White	Beebe	$650,411
White	Searcy	$3,038,279
Woodruff	Augusta	$432,097
Yell	Dardanelle	$893,552
Yell	Danville	$637,648

== History ==
The Arkansas National Guard traces its roots to the creation of the Territorial Militia in 1804. Interest in the Militia in Arkansas generally waxed and waned throughout the 19th century as various national emergencies arose and passed. Arkansas provided troops for the War with Mexico, the American Civil War, and the Spanish–American War during the 19th century. In each case, in answer to the governor's call, local militia companies would turn out and be formed into regiments or battalions for induction into federal service. The militia was also heavily engaged in the violence that characterized the Reconstruction period following the Civil War.

Interest in the militia or Arkansas State Guard as it was known following reconstruction, ebbed and flowed throughout the 19th century, increasing just before or major conflicts, but diminishing in between. Most militia activity was at the local, county and city level, and was often provided for with private funds. It was only late in the 19th century, in the preparations for the Spanish–American War that the State Guard, as it was known then, truly came into existence as a stable organized force.

Following the Spanish–American War, the Arkansas State Guard, along with the militia forces of all other states, was reorganized as the Arkansas National Guard. With the reorganization came the first nationally directed training and increased funding. During World War I, units were stripped of their state designations and were given federal designations upon mustering into federal service. The National Guard saw a massive expansion and increased funding and training following World War I. A similar increase was seen after World War II. Following World War II, the air component was separated into the Arkansas Air National Guard. Both the air and land components of the Arkansas National Guard supplied forces for the Korean War. In 1967 during a nationwide reorganization of National Guard Units, the Arkansas Army National Guard took on most of its current force structure with one Infantry Brigade, One Field Artillery Brigade, Aviation units, and various Separate Companies under the Troop Command. Arkansas units have served in every major conflict since the Seminole War, with the exception of Vietnam. Arkansas Army and Air units remain fully engaged in the ongoing global war on terrorism.

Throughout its service to the nation during times of war, the Arkansas National Guard has continued to perform its role of providing service to the citizens of the state during times of disaster. The Guard has responded to numerous tornadoes, floods and fires, in addition to being called upon to provide security and quell violence in times of civil disturbance. The Guard has also provided support to neighboring states, most notably Louisiana during Hurricanes Katrina, Rita and Ike.

The history of the Arkansas National Guard is divided into the following time periods:

- Arkansas Territorial Militia 1804–1836
- Arkansas Militia and the War with Mexico, 1836–1847
- Arkansas Militia in the Civil War, 1848–1865
- Arkansas Militia in Reconstruction, 1865–1879
- Arkansas State Guard and the Spanish–American War, 1879–1900
- Arkansas National Guard during World War I, 1900–1919
- Arkansas National Guard and World War II, 1920–1945
- Arkansas Air National Guard, 1949–present
- Arkansas Army National Guard and the Korean War, 1949–1954
- Arkansas Army National Guard and the Cold War, 1954–1989
- Arkansas National Guard and the Integration of Central High School, 1957
- Arkansas Army National Guard in Operation Desert Storm, 1990–1991
- Arkansas Army National Guard and the Global War on Terrorism, 1992–present
- Arkansas Air National Guard, 1949–present

== List of adjutants general ==
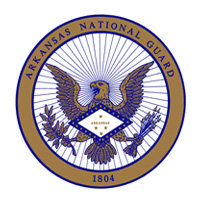
Col. A. P. Spencer, 1819–1823

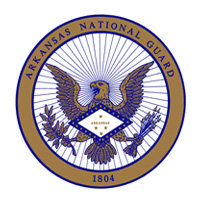
Col. Terrence Farrelly, 1823–1825

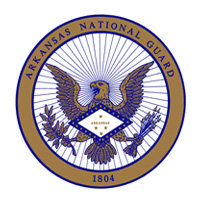
Col. Benjamin Desha, 1826–1828

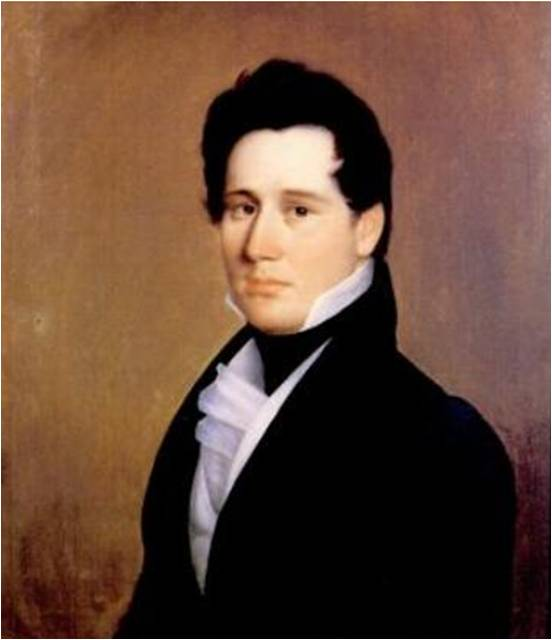
Col. Wharton Rector, Jr., 1828–1832

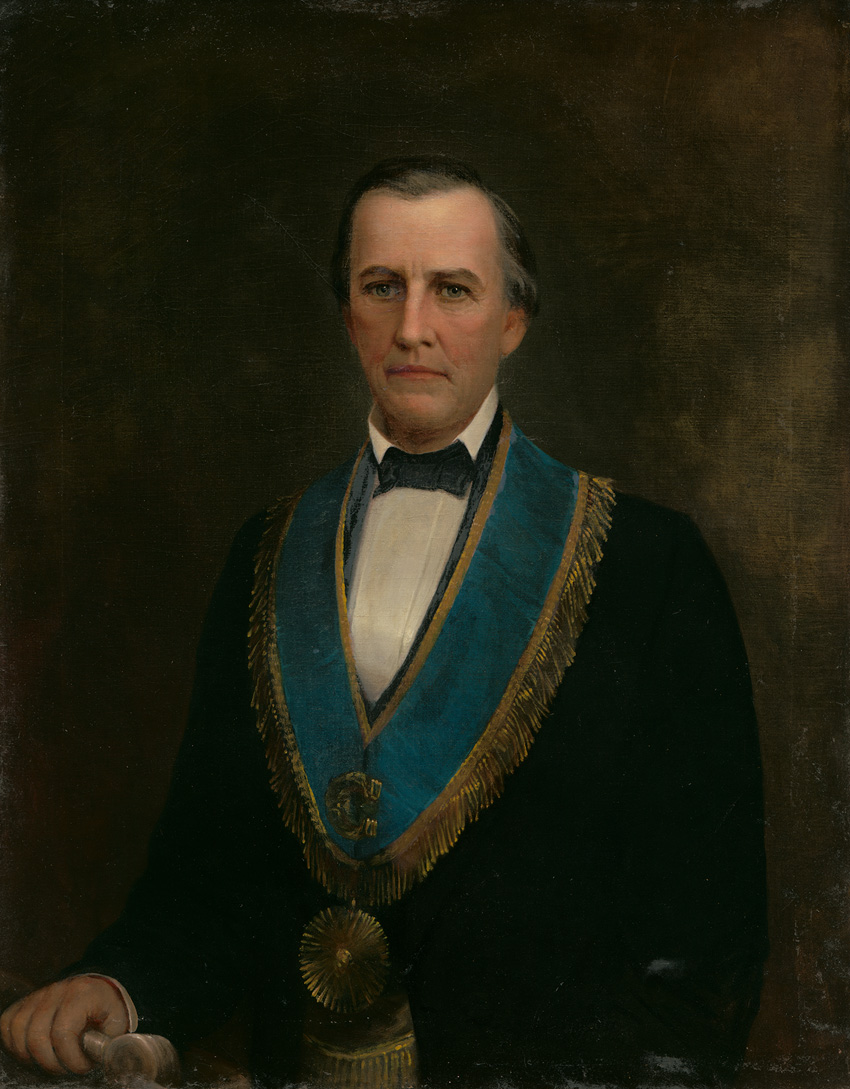
Col. Archibald Yell, 1832–1833

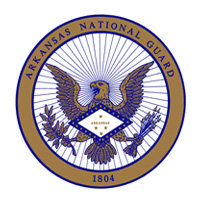
Col. William Field, 1833–1835

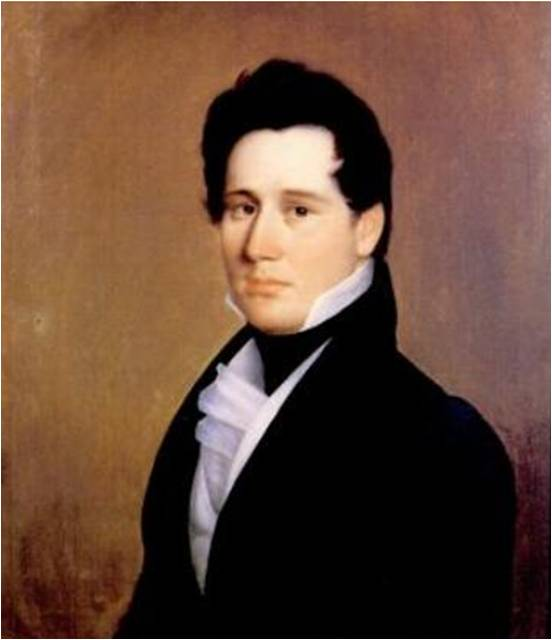
Col. Wharton Rector, Jr., 1835–1836

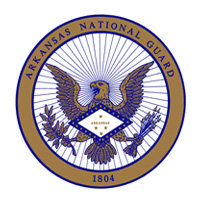
Col. Daniel T. Witter, 1836

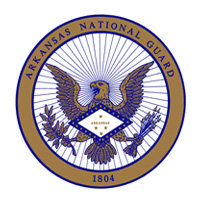
Col. John N. Boyle, 1836–1837

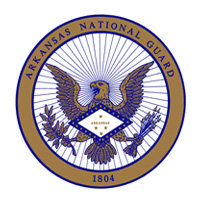
Col. William B. Conway, 1837–1838

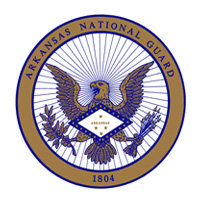
Col. Samuel H. Hempstead, 1838–1845

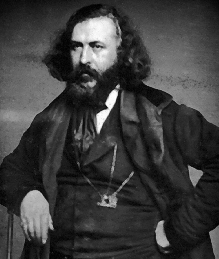
Col. Albert Pike, 1845–1846

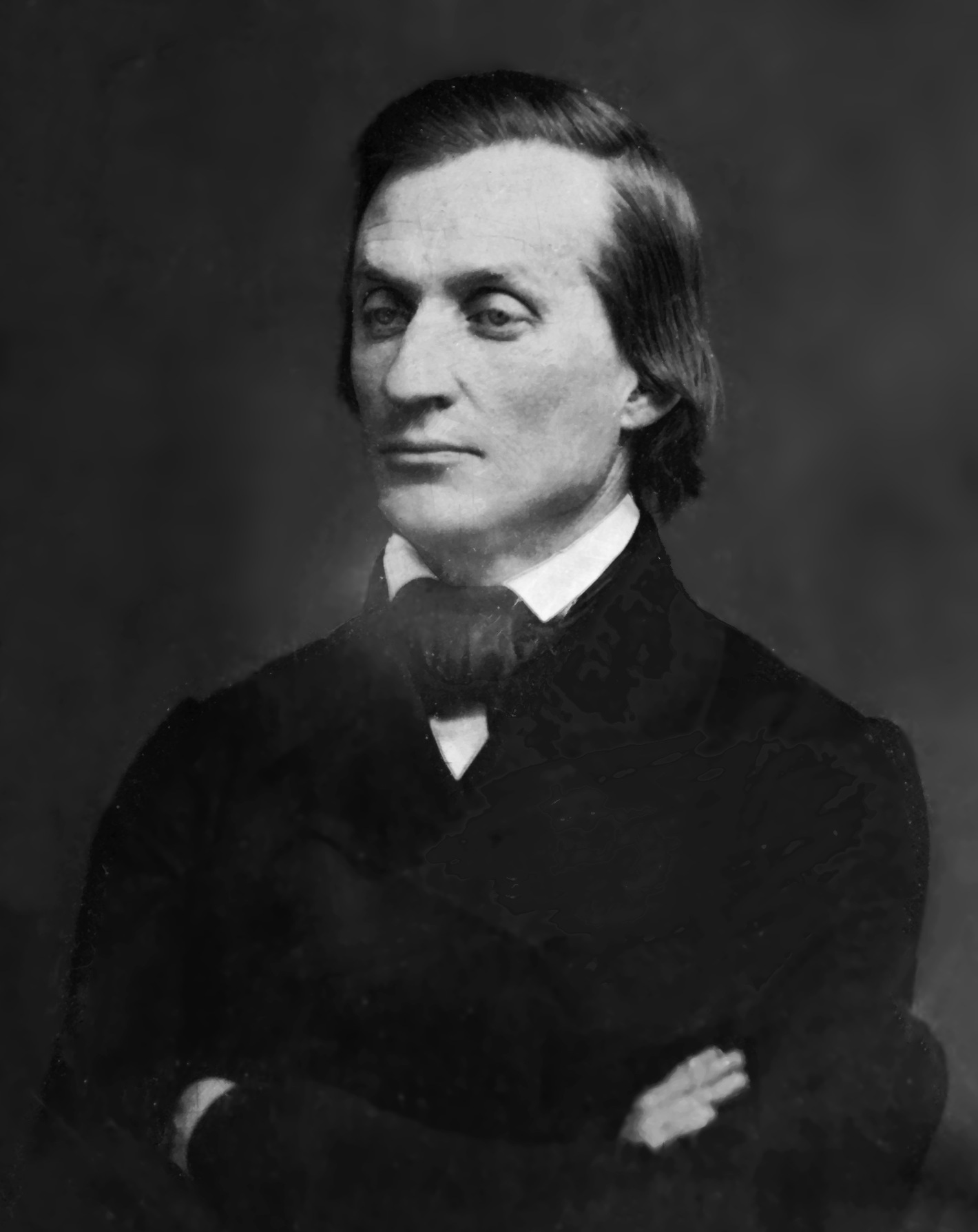
Col. Solon Borland, 1846–1848

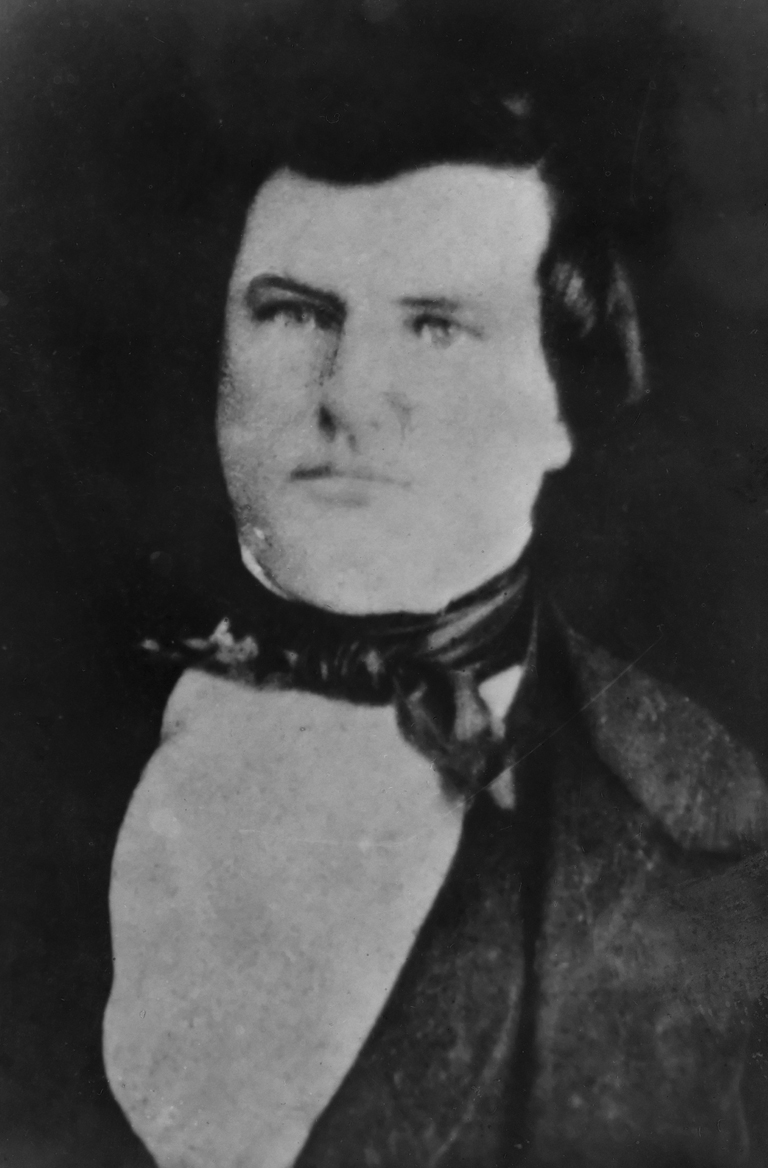
Col. John S. Roane, 1848–1849

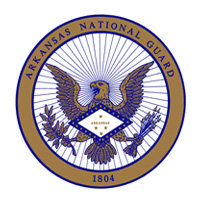
Col. Allan Wood, 1849–1851

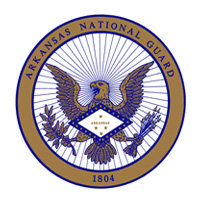
Col. John Hutt, 1853–1860

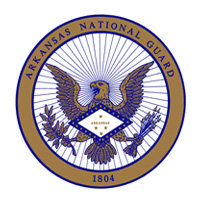
Col. Edmund Burgevin, 1861–1862

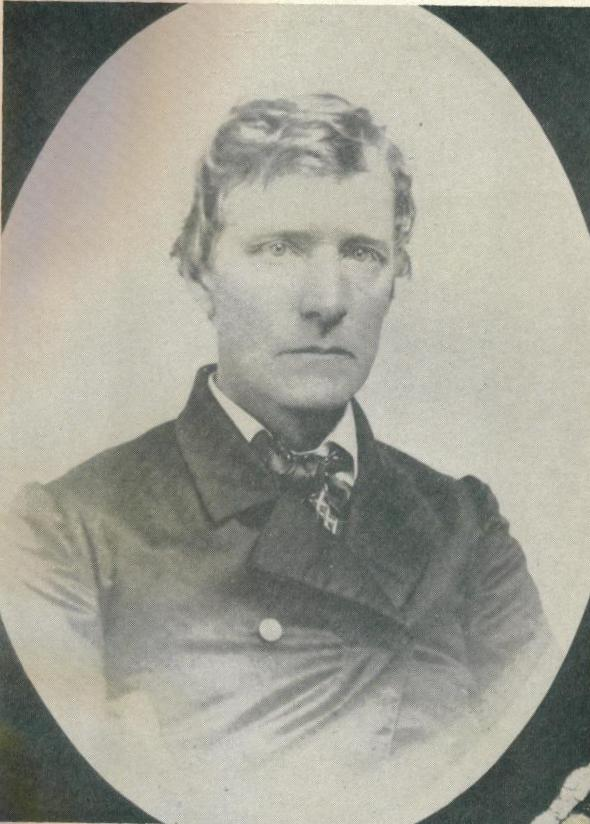
Col. Gordon N. Peay, 1862–1865 (Note: Governor Flanagin evacuated Little Rock before it fell to Union forces on September 10, 1863, leading a government in exile at Washington, Arkansas, until the end of the war. Henry, Sams, and Bishop were successively appointed by occupation authorities between 1863 and 1865, thus causing an overlap in the position.)

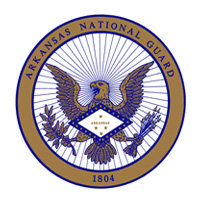
Col. C. A. Henry, 1864

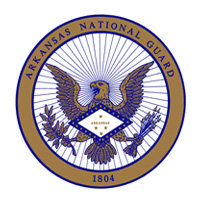
Col. F. M. Sams, 1864

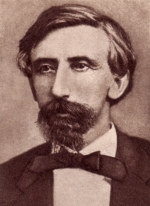
Brig. Gen. Albert W. Bishop, 1864–1868

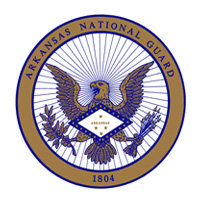
Keyes Danforth, 1868–1873

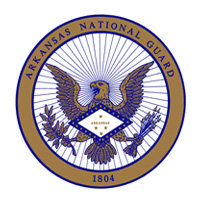
Frank Strong, 1873–1874

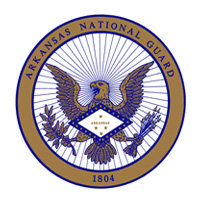
M. McCananny, 1874

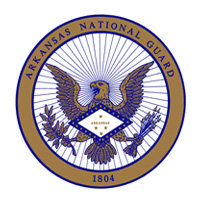
Charles H. Woods, 1874–1877

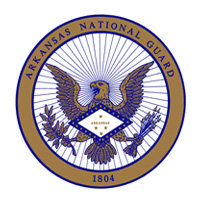
James Pomeroy, 1877–1881

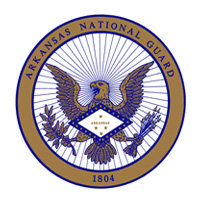
Sam J. Churchill, 1881–1882

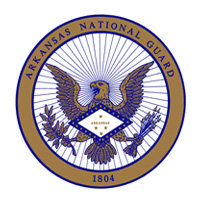
James F. Reed, 1883

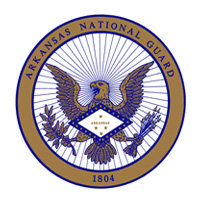
L. H. McGill, 1883–1884

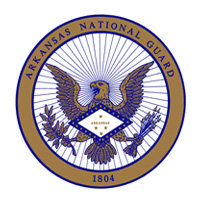
W. H. Langford, 1884–1885

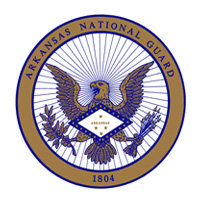
W. B. Hughes, 1885–1889

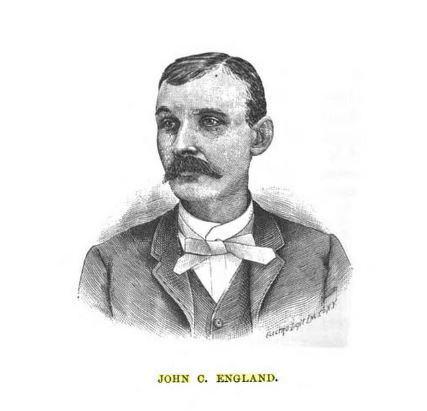
John C. England, 1889–1891

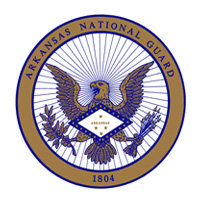
A. W. Giles, 1891

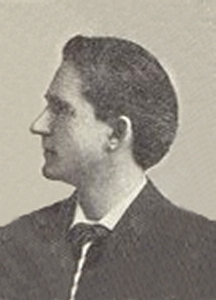
Kie Oldham, 1891–1897

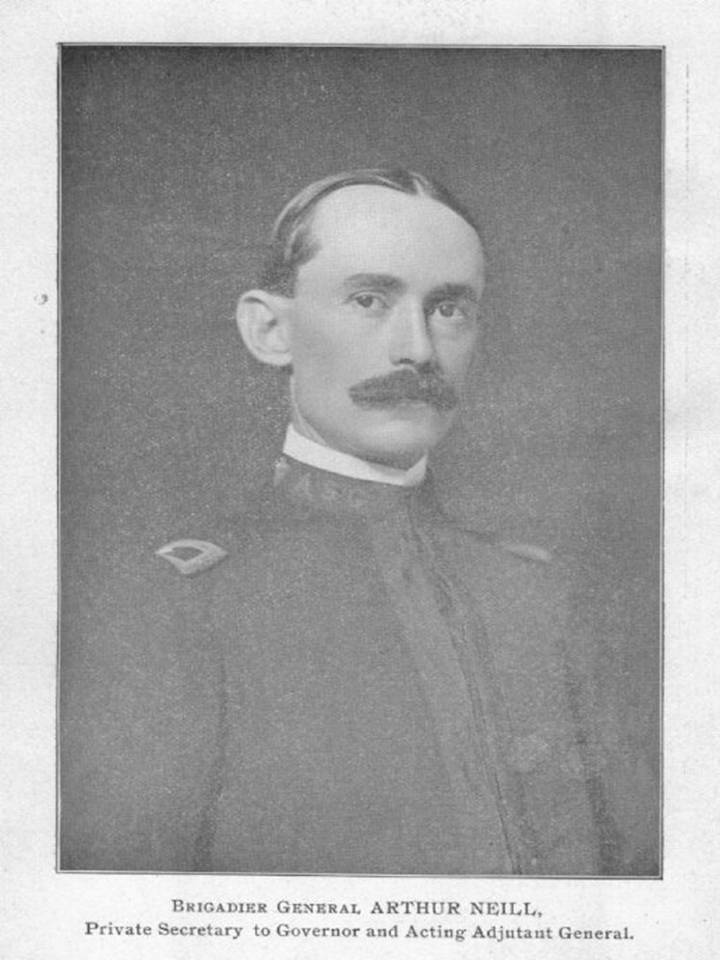
Brig. Gen. Arthur Neill, 1897–1900

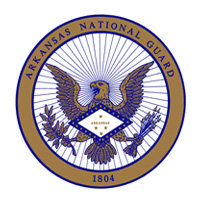
Brig. Gen. Charles Jacobson, 1901–1907

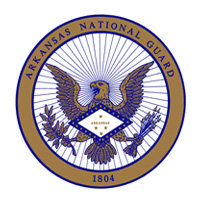
Brig. Gen. Paul Little, 1907–1909

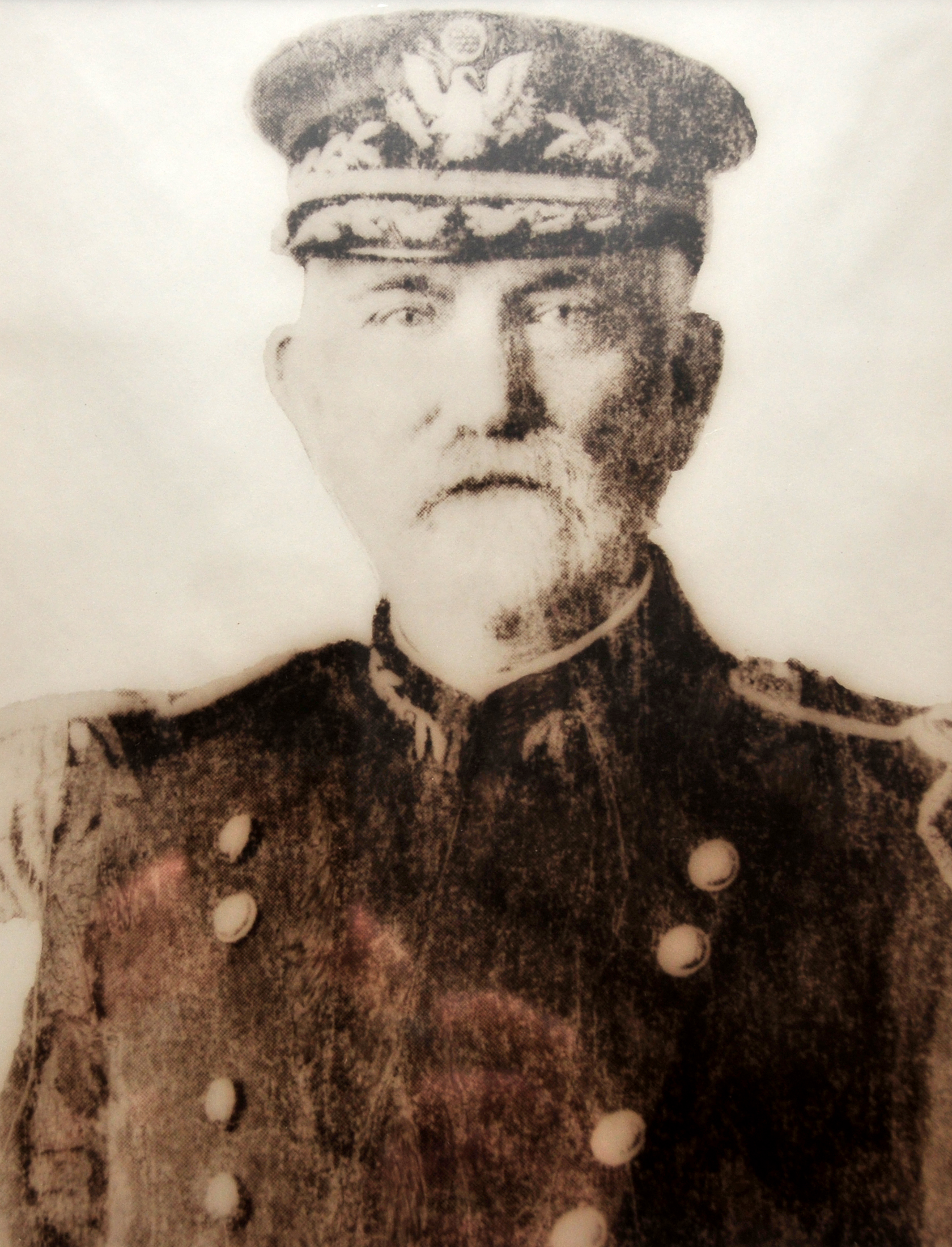
Brig. Gen. Benjamin W. Green, 1909–1913

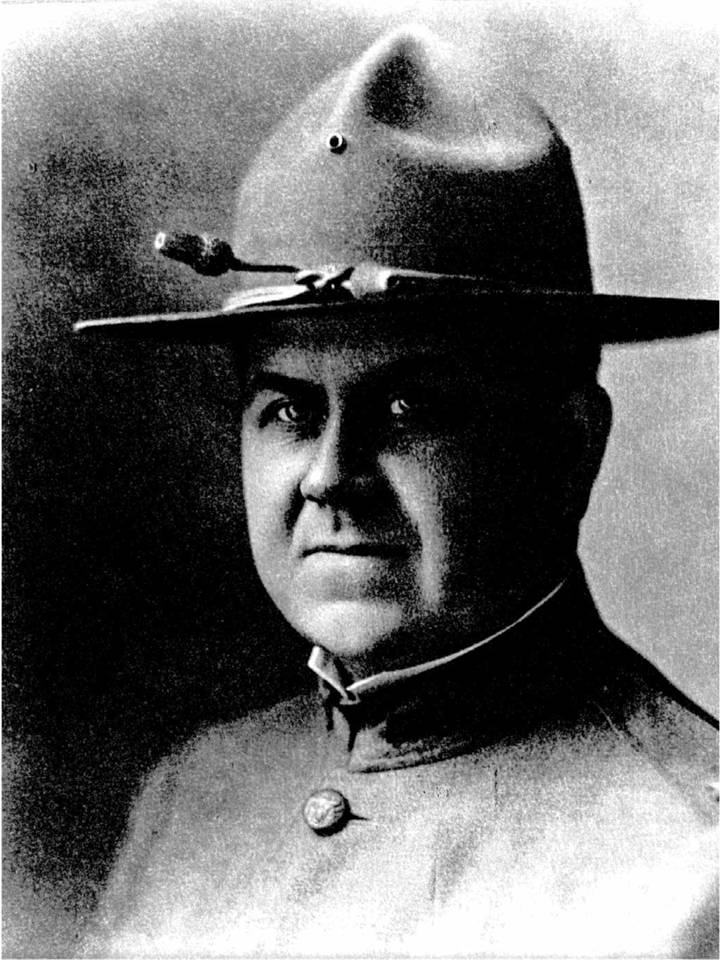
Brig. Gen. Lloyd England, 1913–1919

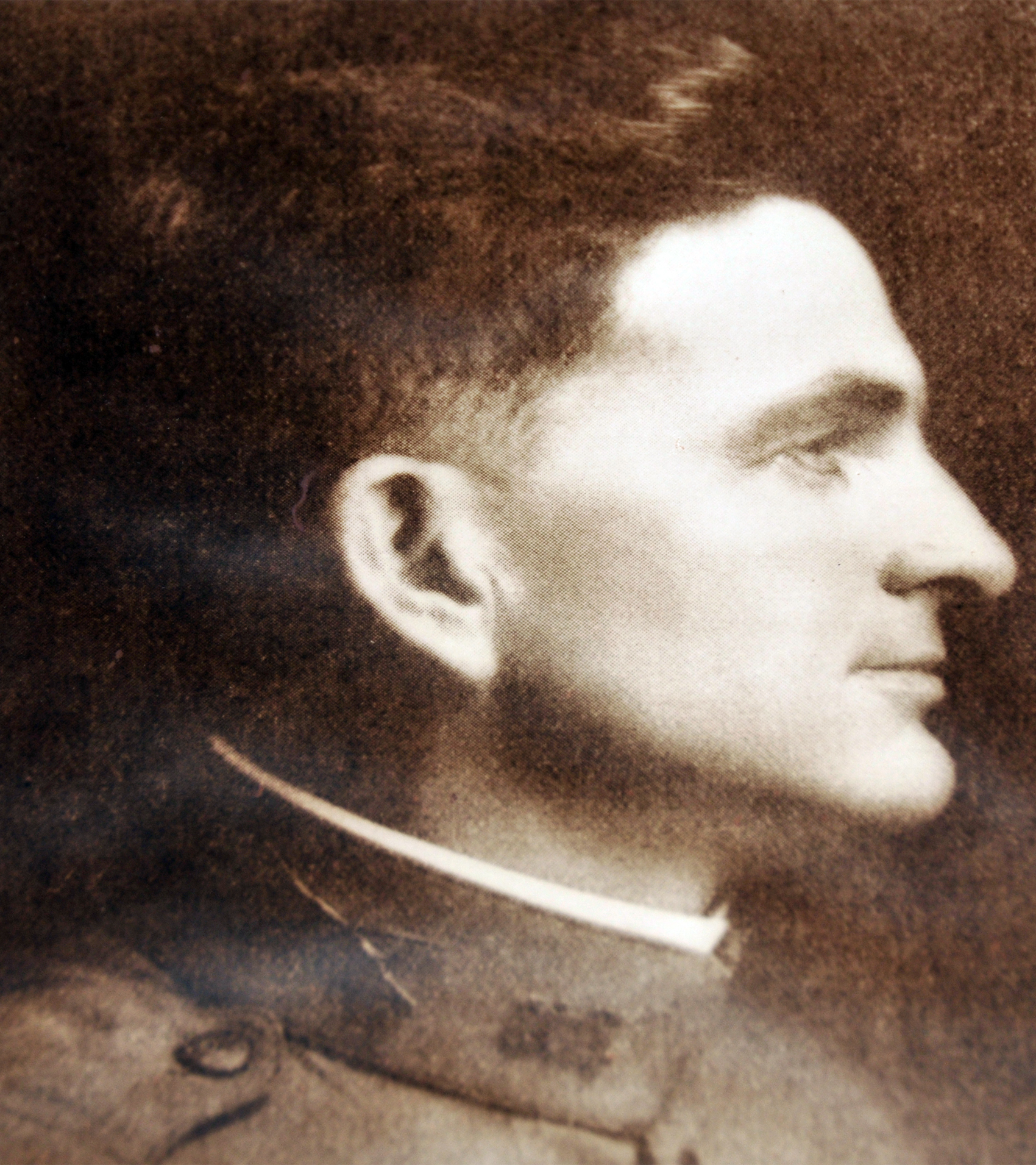
Brig. Gen. Joe S. Harris, 1919–1921

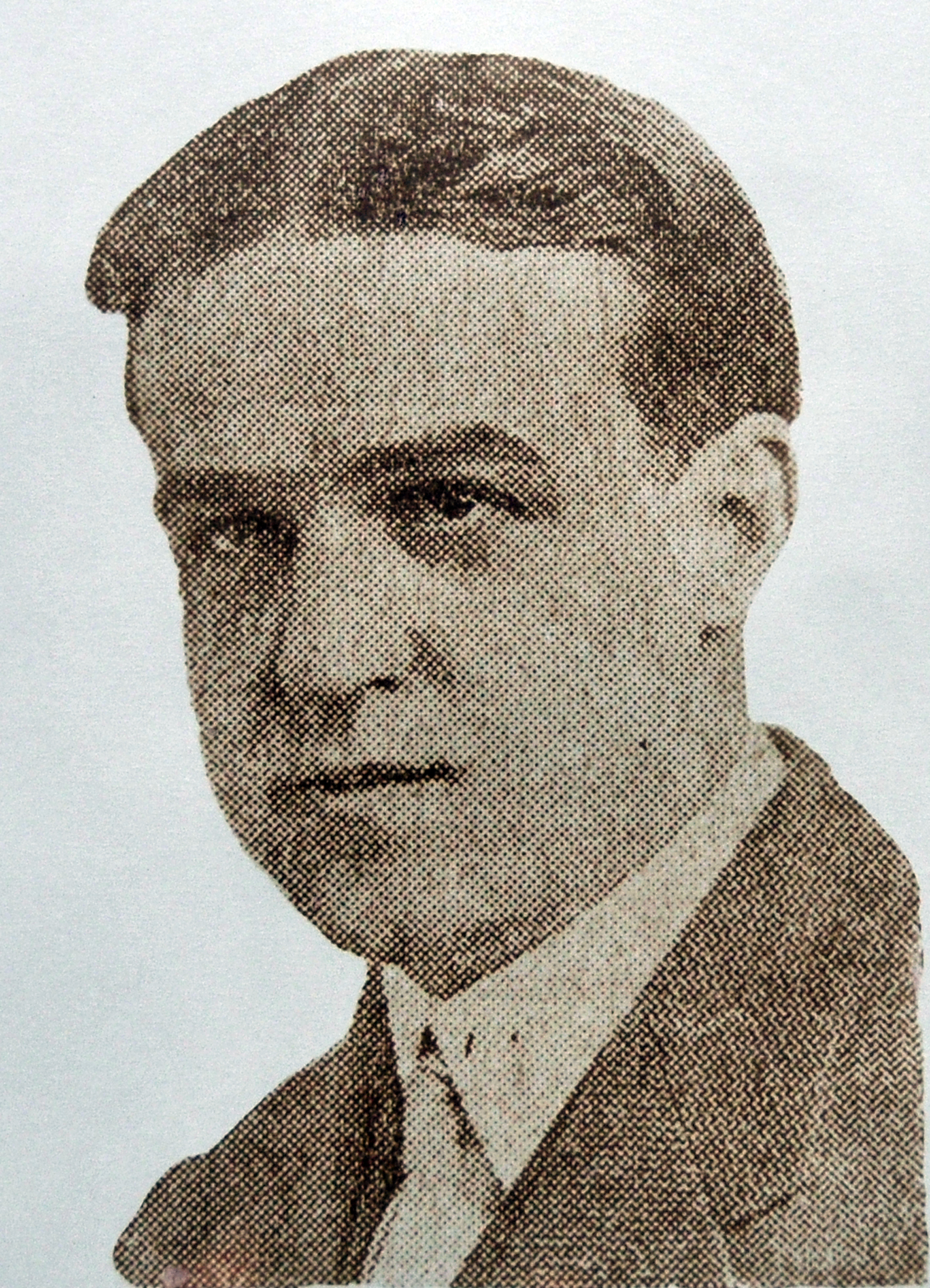
Brig. Gen. Virgil A. Beeson, 1921–1922

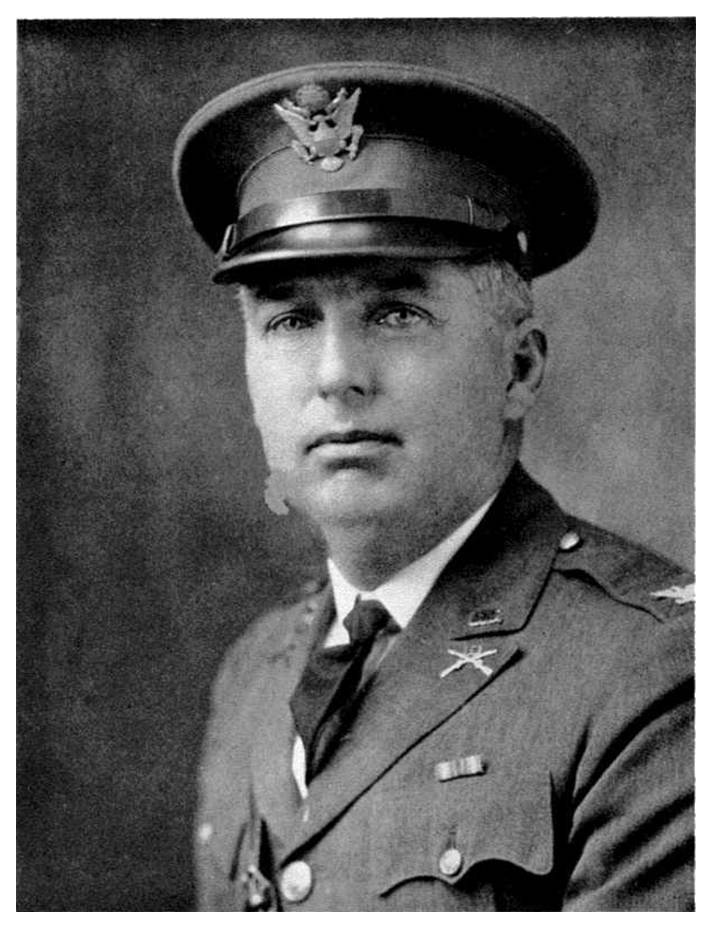
Brig. Gen. Heber L. McAlister, 1922–1925

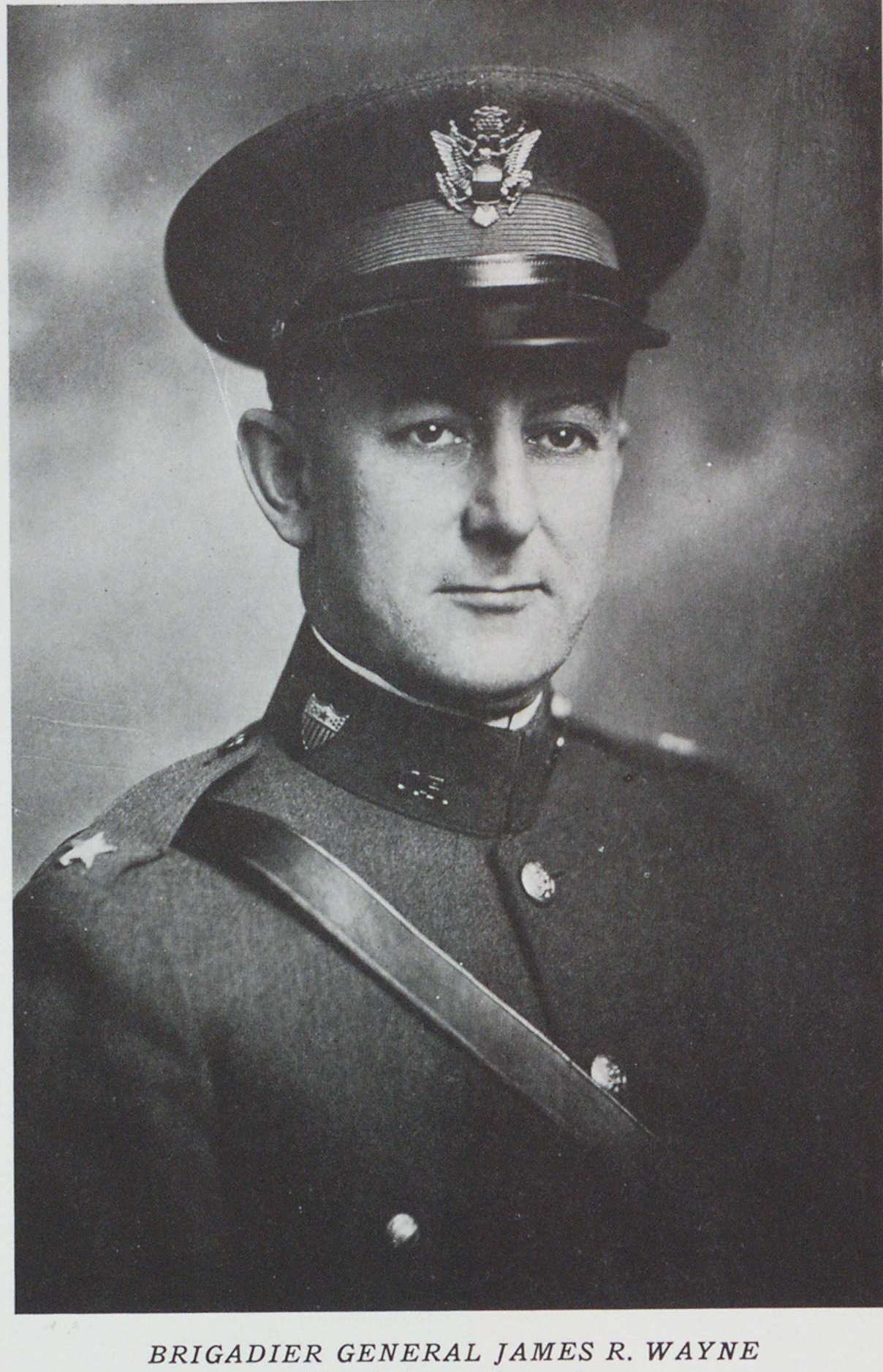
Brig. Gen. James R Wayne, 1925–1927

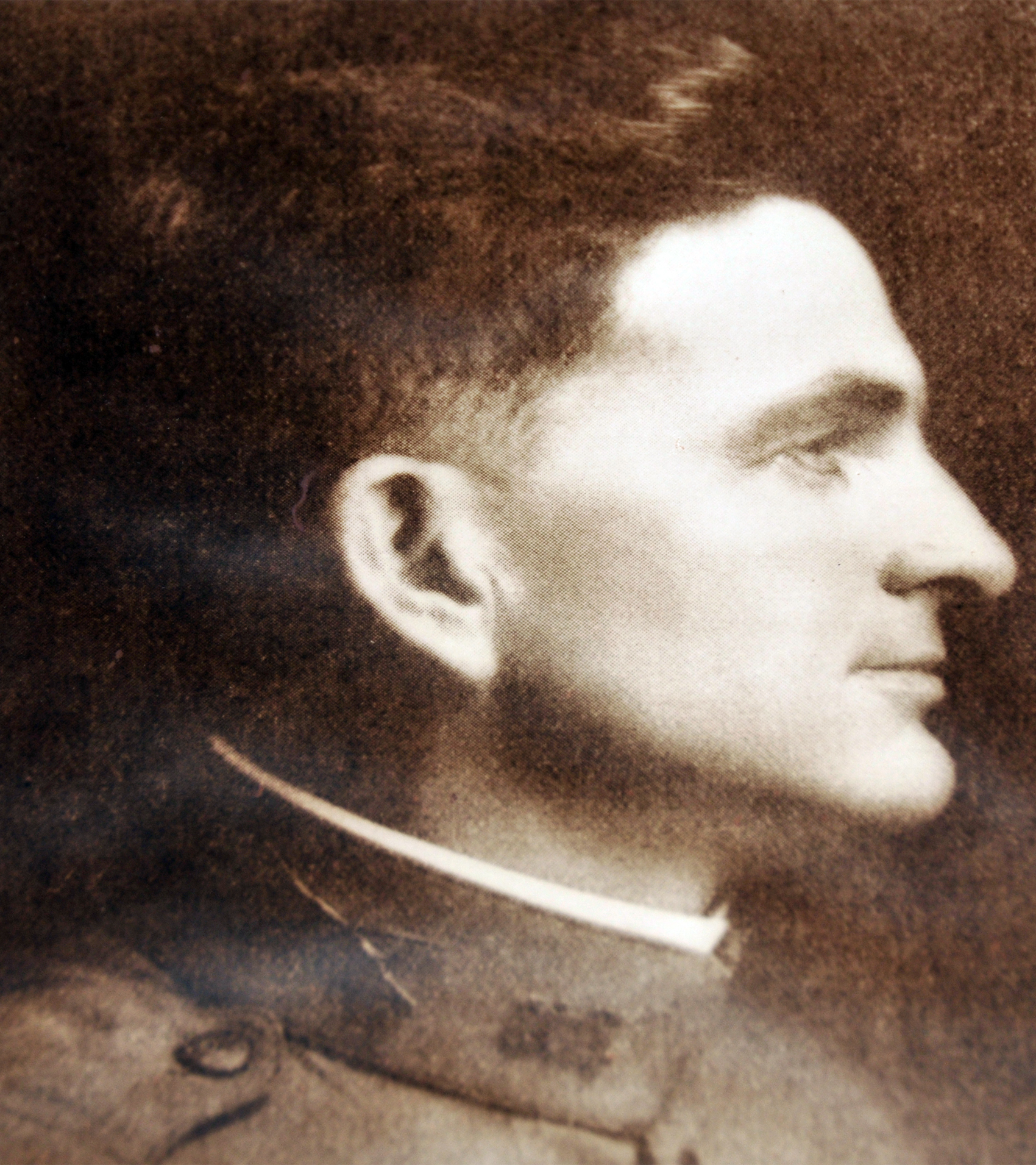
Brig. Gen. Joe S. Harris, 1927–1929

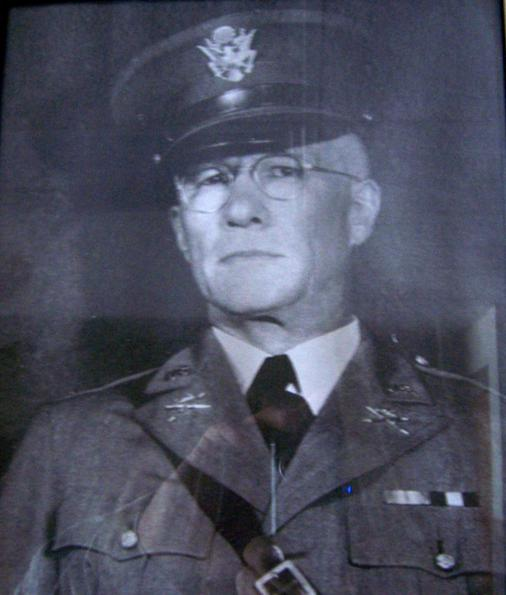
Brig. Gen. Ebenezer L. Compere, 1929–1937

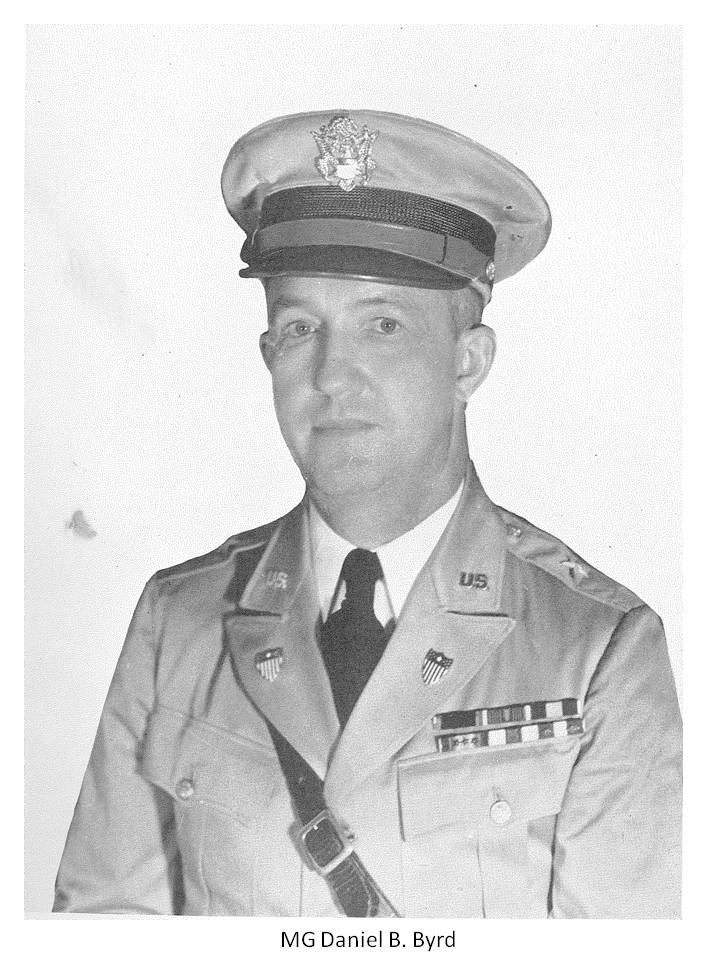
Brig. Gen. Daniel B. Byrd, 1937–1941

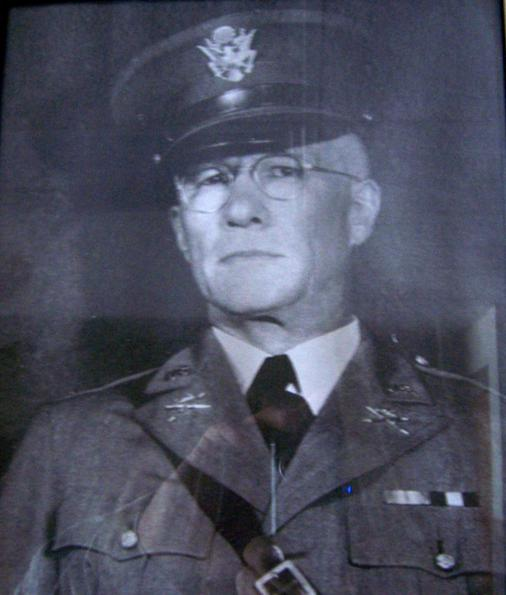
Brig. Gen. Ebenezer L. Compere, 1941–1945

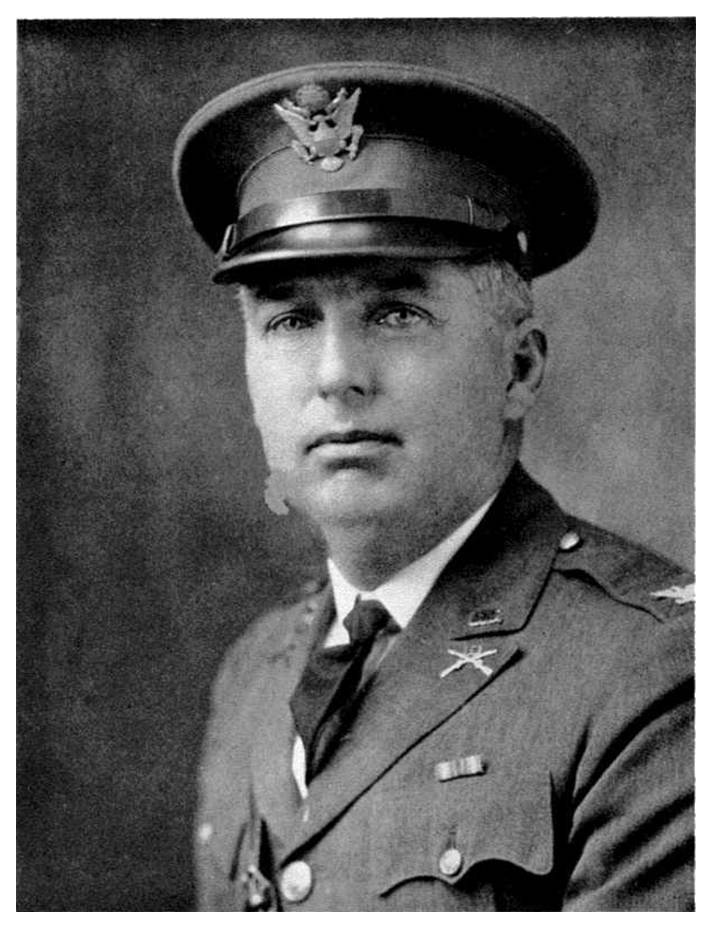
Brig. Gen. Heber L. McAlister, 1945–1949

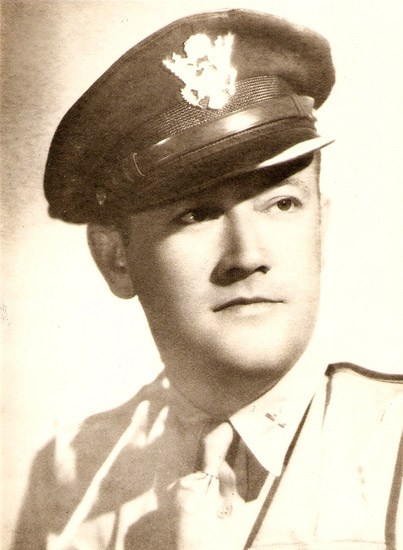
Brig. Gen. Earl Ricks, 1949–1950

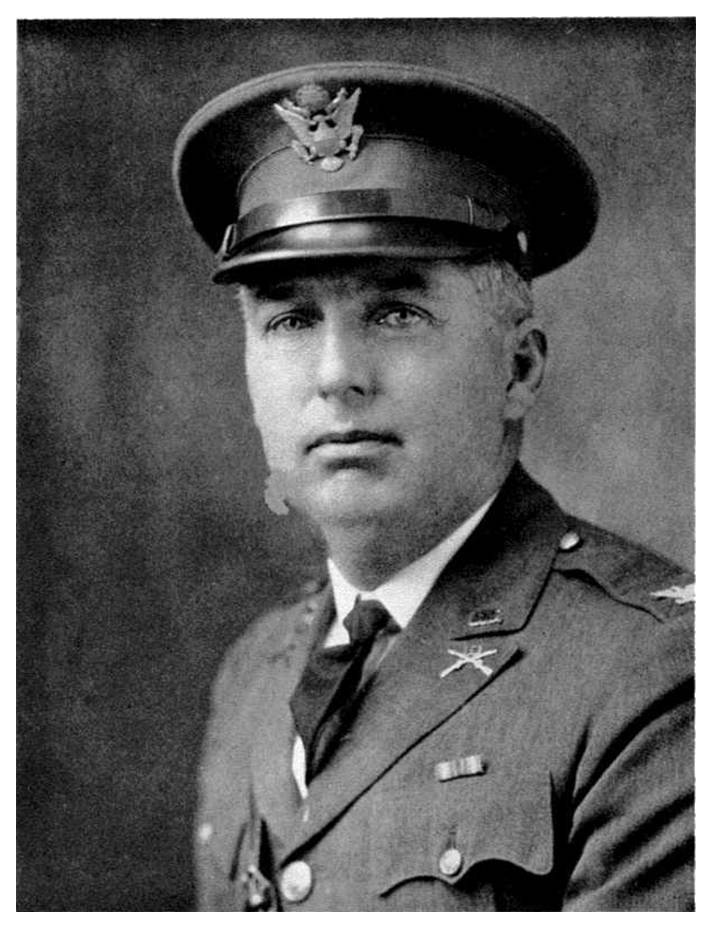
Brig. Gen. Heber L. McAlister, 1950–1951

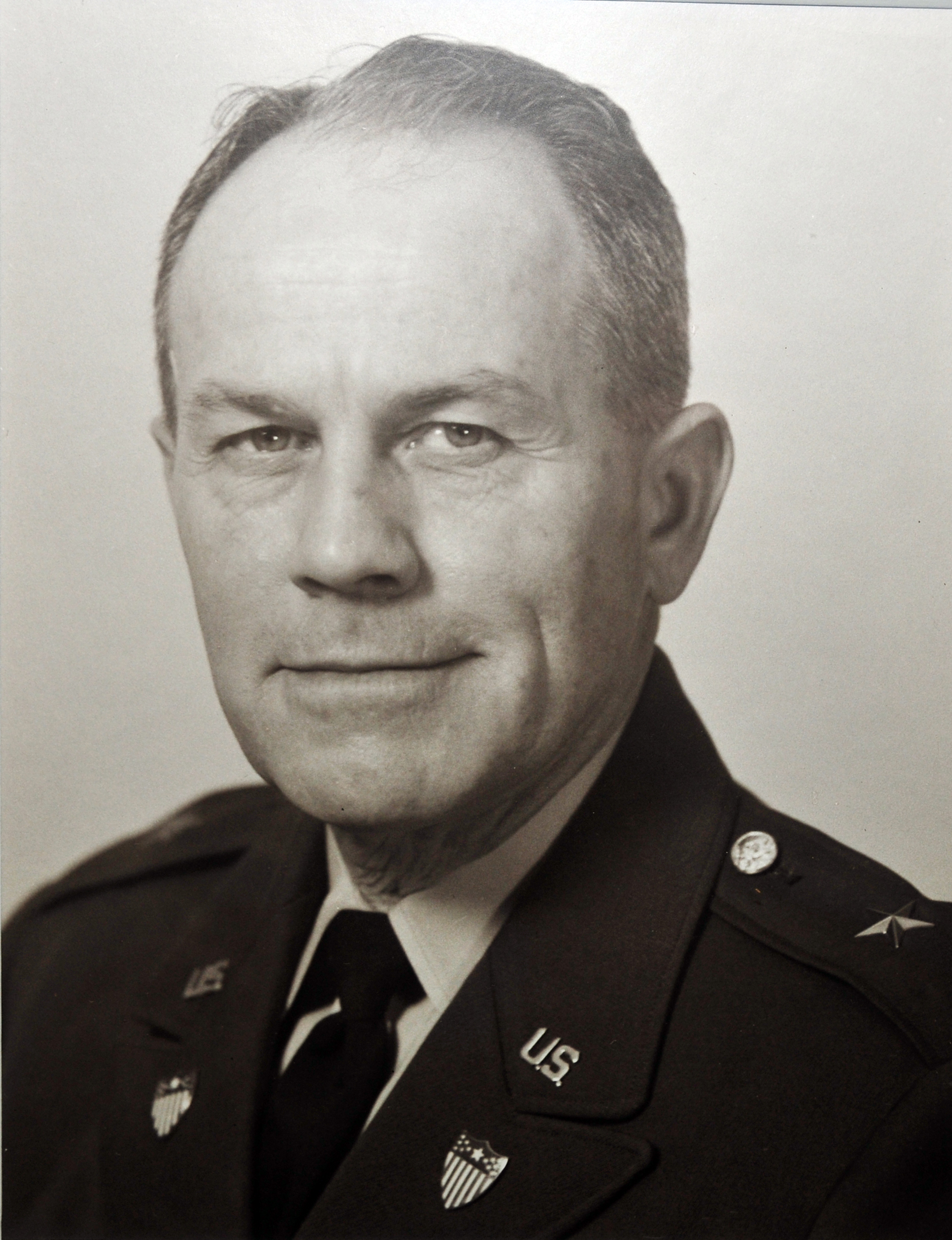
Brig. Gen. John B. Morris, Jr., 1951–1953

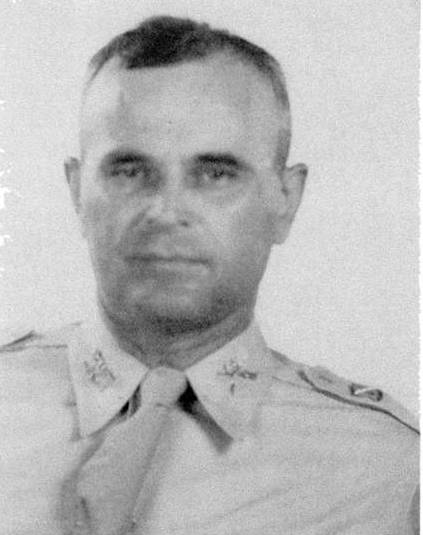
Maj. Gen. Lucien Abraham, 1953–1955

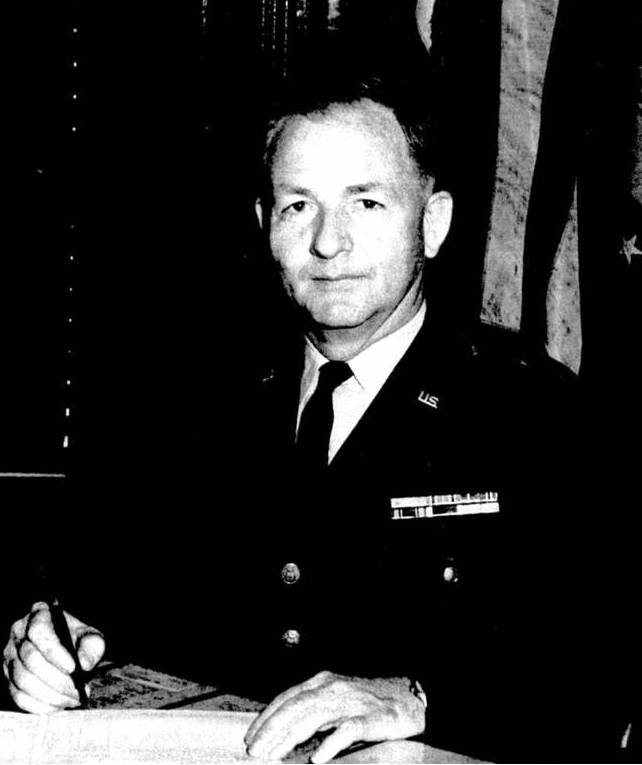
Maj. Gen. Sherman T. Clinger, 1955–1966

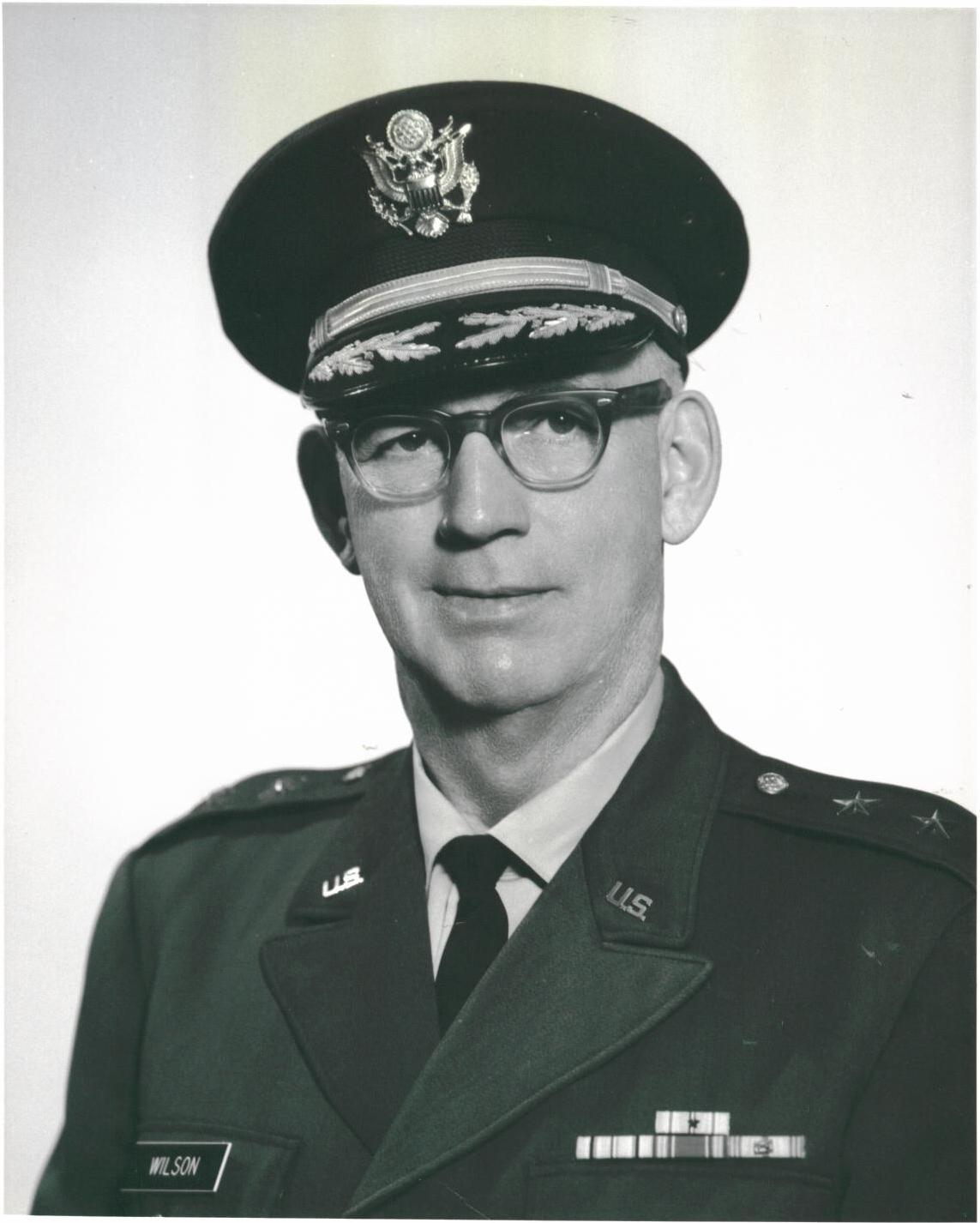
Maj. Gen. Charles H. Wilson, 1967–1970

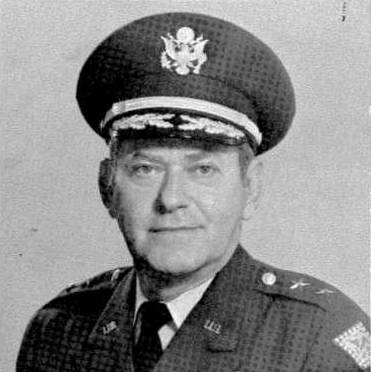
Maj. Gen. Thomas M. Phillips, 1971–1973

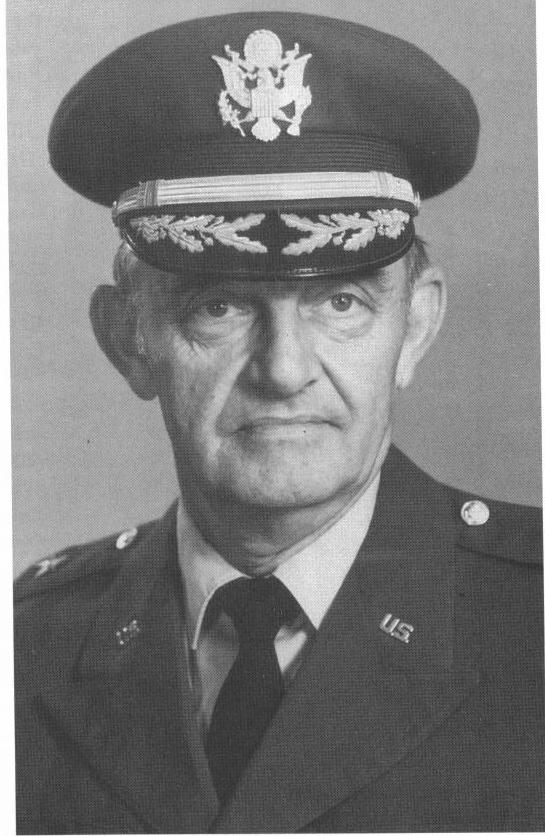
Maj. Gen. Joseph R. Chappell, Jr., 1973–1975

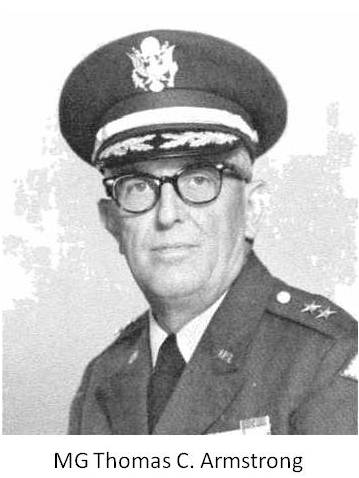
Maj. Gen. Thomas C. Armstrong, 1975–1979

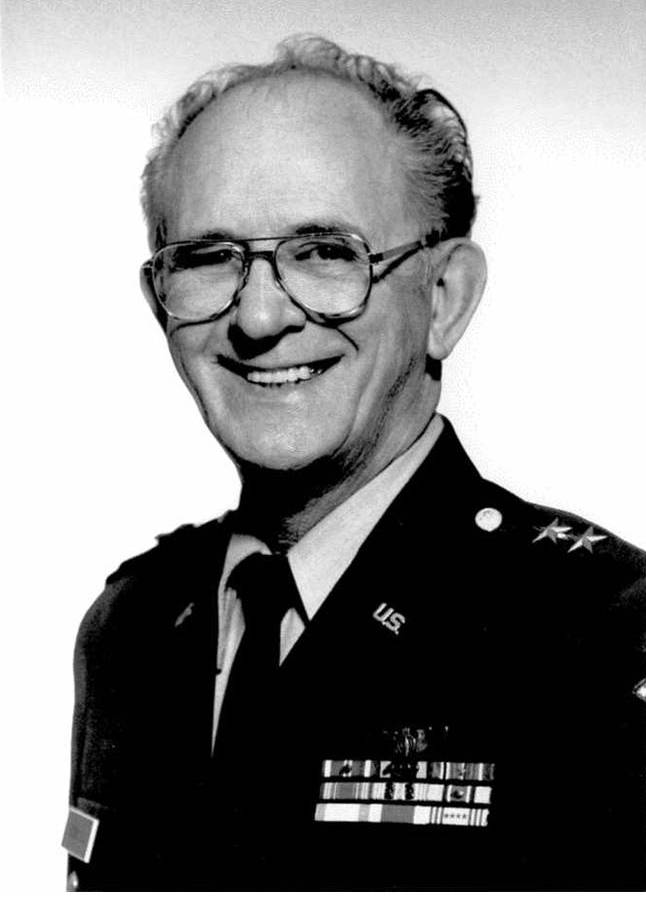
Maj. Gen. James H. Jones, 1979–1981

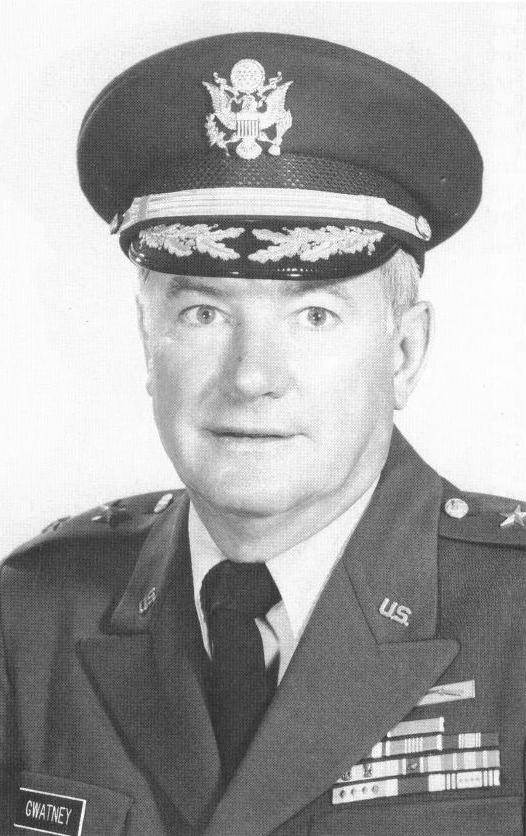
Maj. Gen. Harold L. Gwatney, 1981–1983

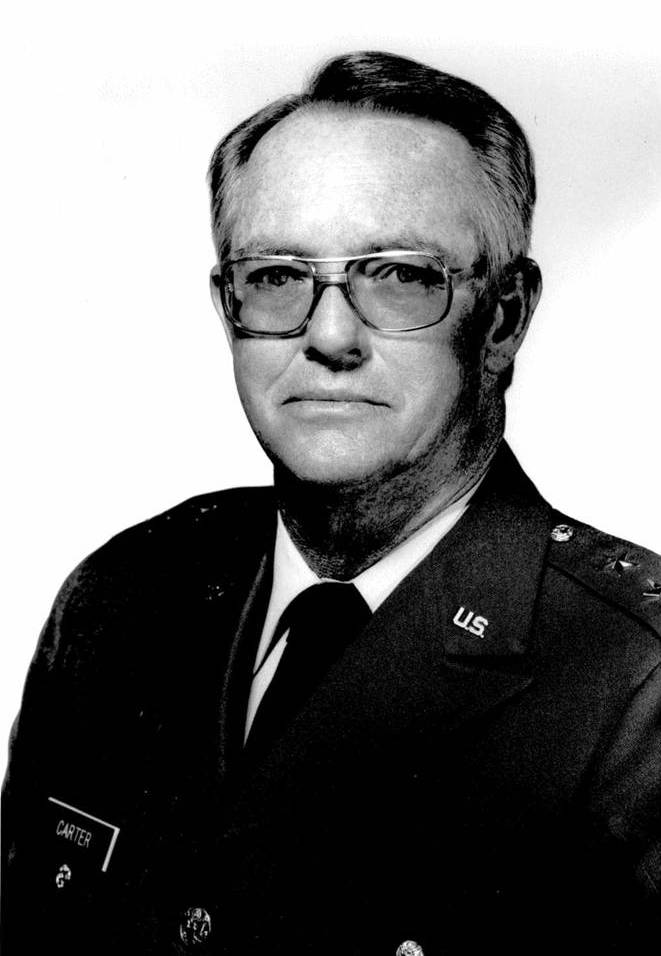
Maj. Gen. Fred M. Carter, 1984–1986

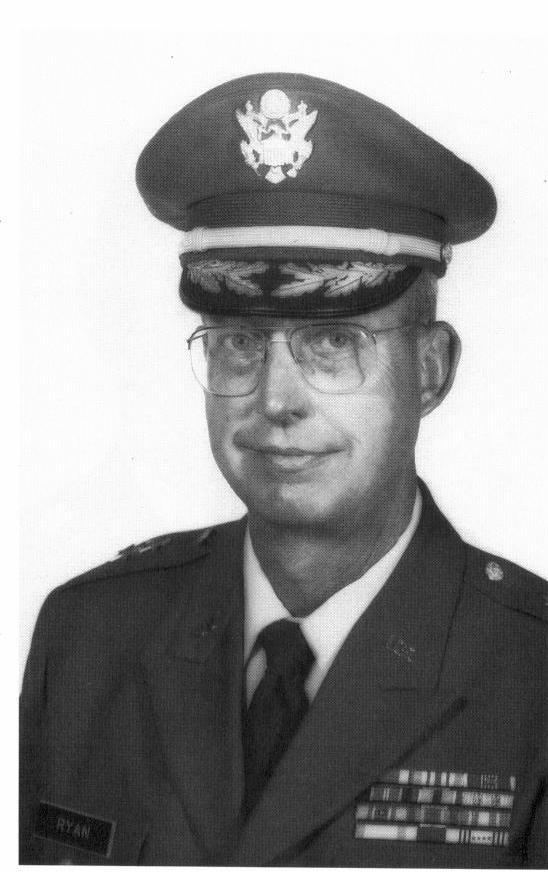
Maj. Gen. James A. Ryan, 1986–1993

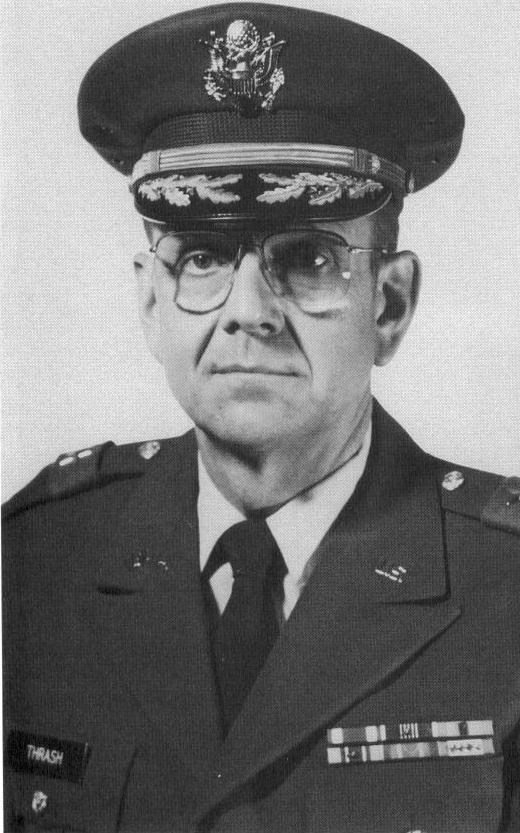
Maj. Gen. Melvin C. Thrash, 1993–1996

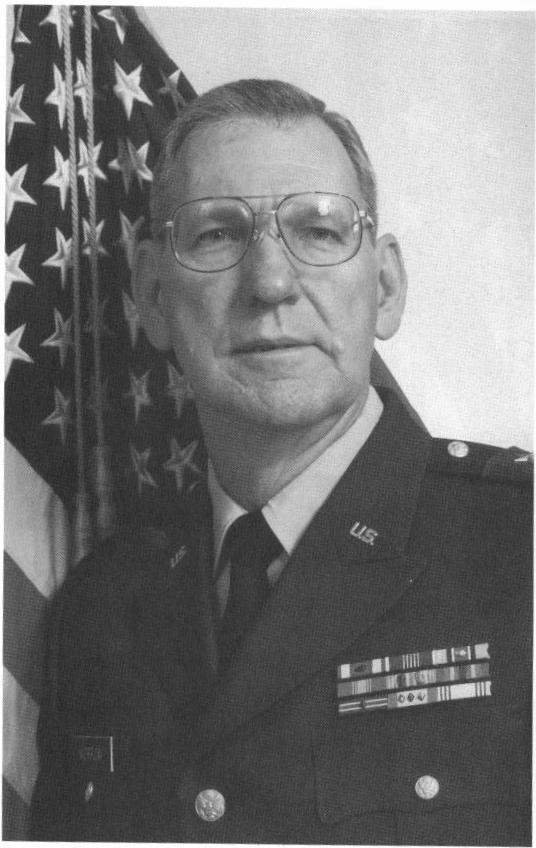
Maj. Gen. Don C. Morrow, 1996–2006

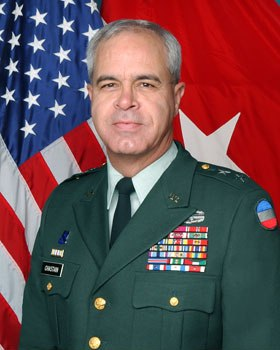
Maj. Gen. Ronald S. Chastain, 2006–2007

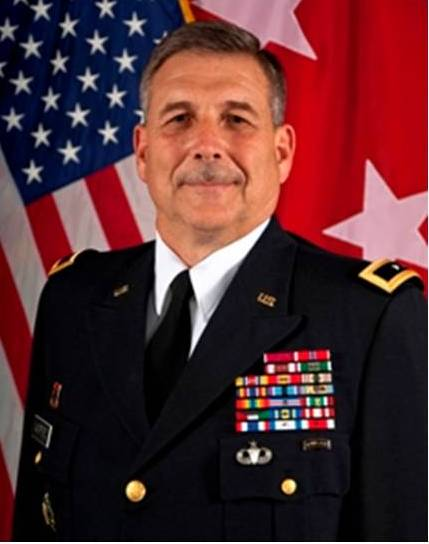
Maj. Gen. William D. Wofford, 2007–2015

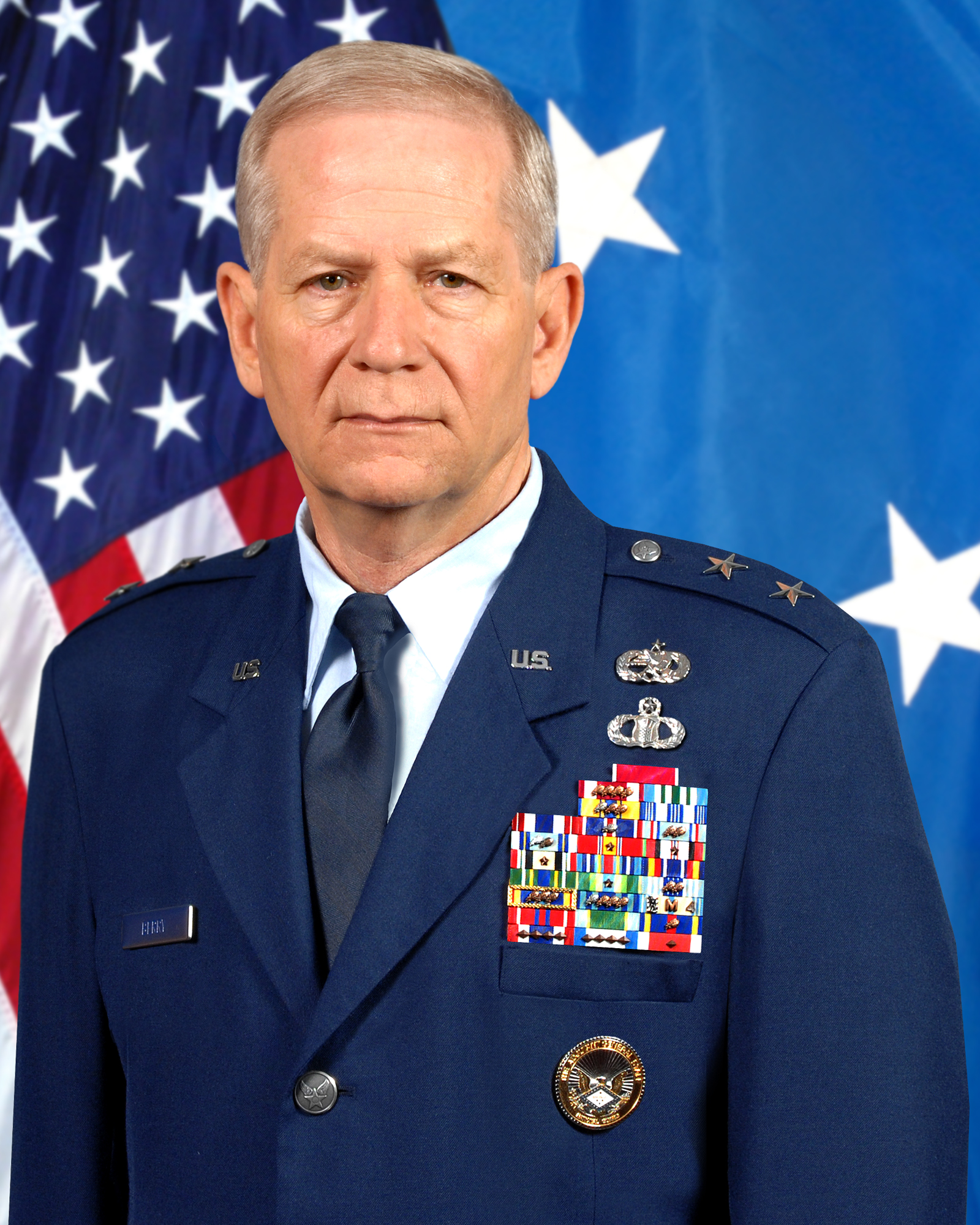
Maj. Gen. Mark H. Berry, 2015–2019

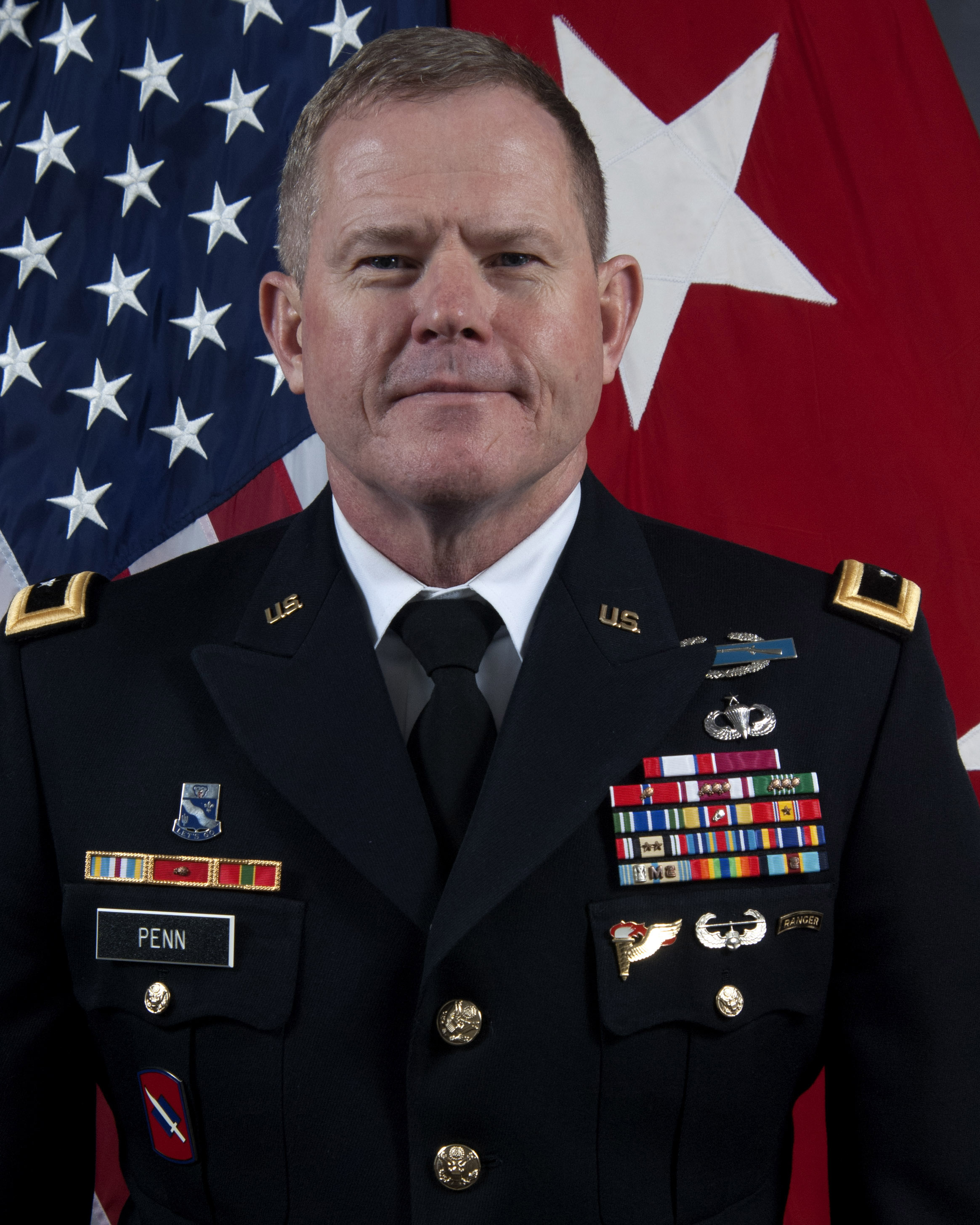
Maj. Gen. Kendall W. Penn, 2019–2023

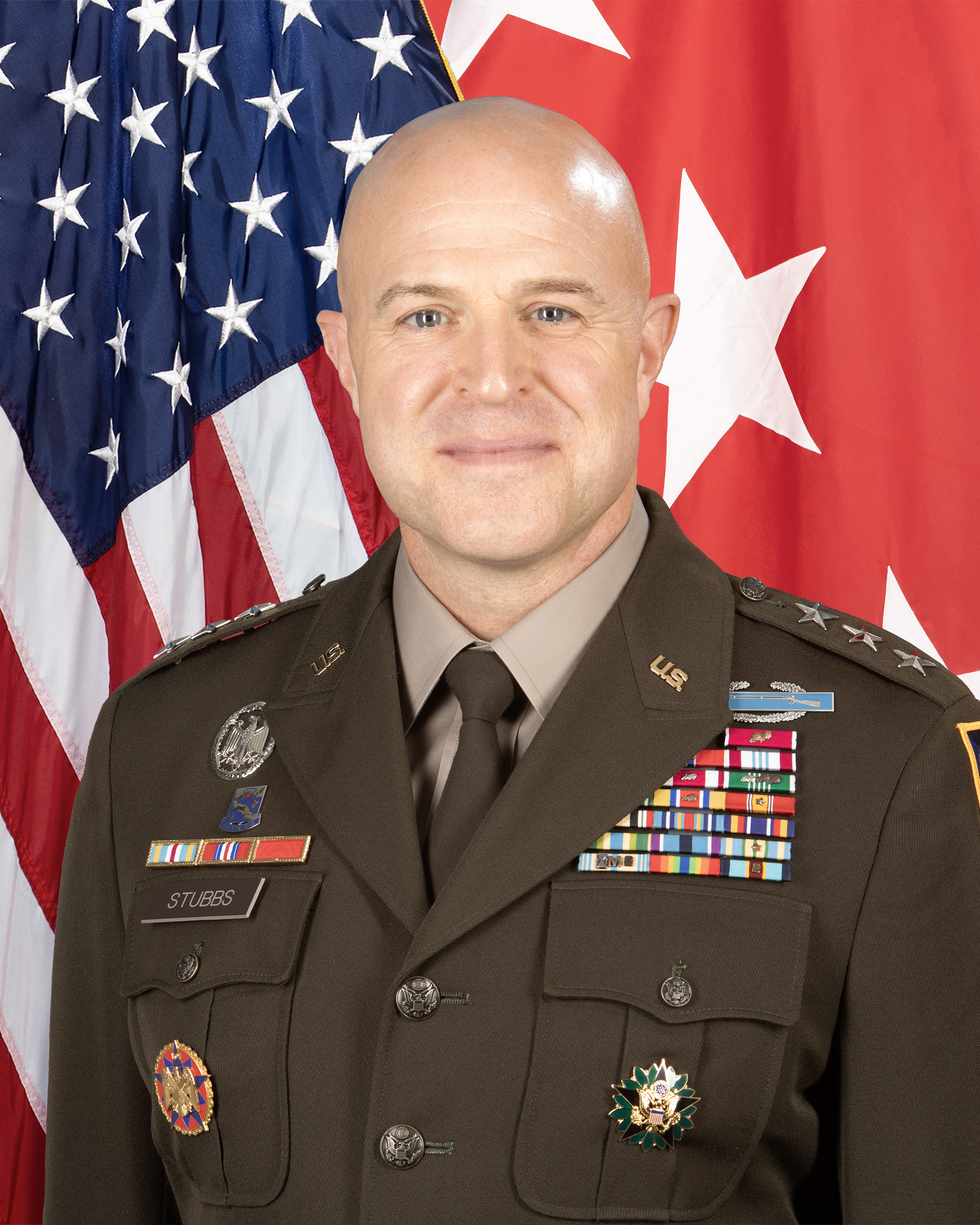
Maj. Gen. Jonathan Stubbs, 2023–2024

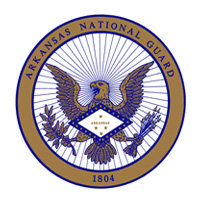
Brig. Gen. Olen C. Bridges, 2024–Present
