= Arkansas Army National Guard and the Korean War =

The history of the Arkansas Army National Guard and Korean War begins with the reorganization of the Arkansas Army National Guard following World War II. During this period, the Arkansas Air National Guard became a separate component of the Arkansas National Guard. The Arkansas Army National Guard provided Field Artillery and Medical units in support of combat operations in Korea.

== Reorganization following World War II ==
With the end of hostilities, the Arkansas National Guard was directed by the War Department to begin re-organization with an expected strength approximately double the size of the pre-war organization. The 39th Infantry Division was reconstituted on 30 September 1946. It was composed of units Arkansas and Louisiana, with its headquarters stationed at Jackson Barracks in New Orleans, Louisiana, and the Arkansas portion headquartered in Little Rock, Arkansas.

Headquarters	Company	Station
39th Division Headquarters (Arkansas Part)		Little Rock
153rd Infantry Regiment	HHC, 153rd IN	Little Rock
	Service Company	Searcy
	Tank Company,	Pine Bluff
	Heavy Mortar Company	DeQueen
	Medical Company	Little Rock
1st Battalion, 153 Infantry Regiment	Headquarters and Headquarters Company,	Texarkana
	Company A, 1-153 IN	Hope
	Company B, 1-153 IN	Malvern
	Company C, 1-153 IN	Prescott
	Company D, 1-153 IN	Arkadelphia
2nd Battalion, 153 Infantry Regiment	Headquarters and Headquarters Company,	Morrilton
	Company E, 2-153 IN	Clarksville
	Company F, 2-153 IN	Dardanelle
	Company G, 2-153 IN	Conway
	Company H, 2-153 IN	Russellville
3rd Battalion, 153 Infantry Regiment	Headquarters and Headquarters Company	Beebe
	Company I, 3-153 IN	Jonesboro
	Company K, 3-153 IN	Walnut Ridge
	Company L, 3-153 IN	Batesville
	Company M, 3-153 IN Command	Blytheville
445th Field Artillery Battalion	Headquarters and Headquarters Battery	Marianna
	Battery A, 445th FA	Helena
	Battery B, 445th FA	Newport
	Battery C, 445th FA	Brinkley
	Service Battery, 445th FA	Wynne, Arkansas
437th Field Artillery Battalion	Headquarters and Headquarters Battery	Hazen
	Battery A, 437th FA	Hot Springs
	Battery B, 437th FA	Newport
	Battery C, 437th FA	Dumas
	Service Battery, 437th FA	Brinkley
217th Engineer Battalion	Headquarters and Headquarters Company	Russellville
	Company A, 217th EN	Russellville
	Company B, 217th EN	Monticello
	Company C, 217th EN	Magnolia
	Company D, 217th EN	McGehee
	Medical Detachment, 217th EN	Russellville
206th Tank Battalion	Headquarters and Headquarters Company	El Dorado
	Company A, 206th Tank BN	Warren
	Company B, 206th Tank BN	Camden
	Company C, 206th Tank BN	Fordyce
	Company D, 206th Tank BN	Crossett
	Medical Detachment, 206th Tank BN	Fordyce
125th Medical Battalion	Headquarters and Headquarters Company	Little Rock
	Clearing Company, 125th Med BN	Little Rock
	Ambulance Company, 125th Med BN	Little Rock
739th Ordnance Battalion	Headquarters and Headquarters Company	Little Rock
	Company A, 739th Ord BN	Little Rock
	Company B, 739th Ord BN	Little Rock
39th Division Artillery	Headquarters and Headquarters Battery	Little Rock
	39th Replacement Company	Little Rock
	39th Military Police Company	Little Rock

In addition, the following non-divisional units were stationed within the state immediately following World War II:

Headquarters	Company	Station
State Headquarters and Headquarters Detachment		Little Rock
	106th Army Band	Little Rock
	176th Ordnance Detachment	Little Rock
	148th Evac Hospital	Little Rock
101st Medical Battalion	Headquarters and Headquarters Detachment	Booneville
	216th Medical Company	Russellville
	217th Medical Company	Booneville
	218th Medical Company	Sheridan
	219th Medical Company	DeWitt
	233rd Medical Company	Charleston
	235th Medical Company	Lonoke
	295th Medical Company	Dermontt
	296th Medical Company	Eudora
212th Signal Battalion	Headquarters and Headquarters Company	Little Rock
	Company A	Danville
	Company B	Springdale
	Company C	Van Buren
	Company D	Little Rock
	Company E	Malvern
875th Engineer Battalion	Headquarters and Headquarters Company	Pine Bluff
	Company A	Fayetteville
	Company B	Heber Springs
	Company C	Stuttgart
	Medical Detachment	Pine Bluff
875th Eng Avn Bn	Headquarters and Headquarters Company	Pine Bluff
	172nd Engineer Company	Pine Bluff
709th FA Battalion	Headquarters and Headquarters Battery	Paragould
	Battery A	Rector
	Battery B	Augusta
	Battery C	Piggott
	Service Battery, 437th FA	Wynne
142nd Field Artillery Group	Headquarters and Headquarters Battery	Fayetteville
936th Field Artillery Battalion	Headquarters and Headquarters Battery	Fayetteville
	Battery A	Bentonville
	Battery B	Berryville
	Battery C	Rogers
	Service Battery	Harrison
	Medical Detachment	Fayetteville
937th Field Artillery Battalion	Headquarters and Headquarters Battery	Fort Smith
	Battery A	Mena
	Battery B	Paris
	Battery C	Ozark
	Service Battery	Mena
	Medical Detachment	Ozark
151st Anti Aircraft Artillery Battalion	Headquarters and Headquarters Battery	Harrison
	Battery A	Mountain Home
	Battery B	Berrville
	Battery C	Marshall
	Battery D	Harrison
	Medical Detachment	Harrison
326th Anti Aircraft Artillery Battalion	Headquarters and Headquarters Battery	West Memphis
	Battery A	Marked Tree
	Battery B	West Memphis
	Battery C	Harrisburg
	Battery D	West Helena
	Medical Detachment	Marked Tree
327th Anti Aircraft Artillery Battalion	Headquarters and Headquarters Battery	Jonesboro
	Battery A	Jonesboro
	Battery B	Jonesboro
	Battery C	Jonesboro
	Battery D	Jonesboro
	Medical Detachment	Jonesboro

Additionally, the state was authorized to form several units under the new Arkansas Air National Guard.

== Korean War ==
The following Army National Guard units were called to active duty for service during the Korean War:

The 936th Field Artillery Battalion mobilized August 2, 1950, and moved to Camp Carson, CO for training. It arrived in Korea February 10, 1951, and fired its first combat mission March 30, 1951. The unit provided fire support to 3rd, 25th and 1st Republic of Korea Division as well as the 1st Cavalry Division. The 936th fired 348,547 combat rounds in Korea and suffered 10 killed in action and 28 wounded in action. The battalion was deactivated September 25, 1954. The battalion was awarded battle streamers for the following campaigns:

- First U.N. Counteroffensive
- CCF Spring Offensive
- UN Spring Offensive
- UN Summer – Fall Offensive
- Second Korean Winter.

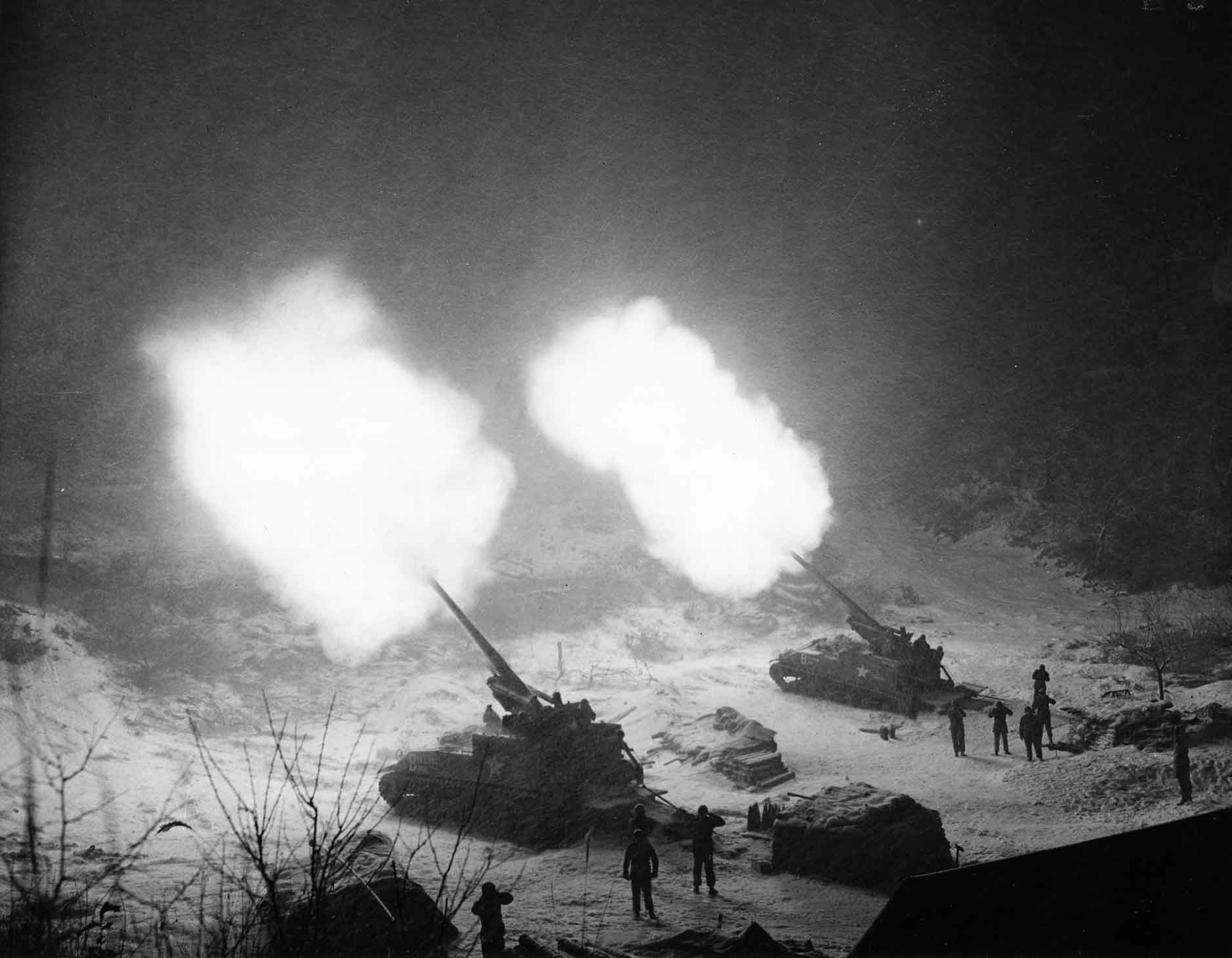
A pair of M-40 155mm Gun Motor Carriages of Battery B, 937th Field Artillery Battalion, from Paris, Arkansas, providing fire support to U.S. Army 25th Infantry Division, Munema, Korea, November 26, 1951

. The 937th Field Artillery Battalion was mobilized on the same day as the 936th and moved to Fort Hood, TX for training. It arrived in Korea on the same ship as the 936th and fired its first combat mission April 3, 1951. The battalion went in to line with the I Corps on April 30 near Uijongbu, Korea. During the Chinese Spring Drive the battalion fell back to Seoul and was moved to IX Corps. Battery A continued with X Corps and was attached to the 1st Marine Division. On May 17, 1952, the Battalion was attached to 2nd Division, IX Corps. For the action with 2nd Division, Battery C and Headquarters Battery received the Distinguished Unit Citation. The battalion continued in general support to IX Corps from July 28, 1953, until October 9, 1954. The 937th fired 223,400 combat rounds in Korea and suffered 13 killed in action and 156 wounded in action. The battalion was deactivated November 26, 1954. The battalion was awarded battle streamers for the following campaigns:

- First U.N. Counteroffensive
- CCF Spring Offensive
- UN Spring Offensive
- UN Summer – Fall Offensive
- Second Korean winter
- Korea, Summer – Fall 1952
- Third Korean Winter
- Korea, Summer 1953.

The 217th Medical Company was mobilized August 2, 1950, and underwent training at Fort Benning, Georgia. The Company departed Fort Lawton, Washington, for January 15, 1951, and arrived in Yokohama, Japan on February 2, 1951. The unit then moved to Kyoto, Japan for training until May 3, 1951. The unit arrived in Pusan, Korea May 4, 1951. The 217th conducted its basic mission of air evacuation of patients to Japan in an area from Pusan north to Seoul. Headquarters Platoon and 1st Platoon were stationed at the K-9 Airbase near Pusan. 2nd Platoon was stationed near Pusan, the 3rd Platoon was stationed near Uljomgby and 4th Platoon was stationed near Chucuhon and Yomdgumgpo and Tamjon. The 217th received the following unit awards during the Korean War:

- The Meritorious Unit Citation
- The Distinguished Unit Citation
- The Korean Presidential Citation
- Japan Occupation Citation

The following units also were called to active duty during the Korean War as well, but were reorganized with combat medical units that were already deployed overseas, many to Korea:

- Headquarters and Headquarters Battery, 142nd Field Artillery Group — Germany
- Headquarters and Headquarters Detachment, 101st Medical Battalion — Germany
- 218th Medical Ambulance Company — Fort Hood and Fort Leonard Wood

== Arkansas National Guard Fallen Soldiers ==
This list of soldiers is intended to include all Arkansas National Guardsmen who died during combat operations. This list may be shorter than the list contained in various unit histories because those lists may contain Soldiers who were not Arkansas National Guardsmen prior to mobilization but joined the unit following mobilization. Many Soldiers who were drafted were later assigned to mobilized Guard units.

- Corporal Donald Osbourn
- Captain Paul Blew
- Private First Class Fred Rose, Jr.
- Private First Class Jarrell Graham
