= Maupin Cummings =

American judge, soldier, and politician

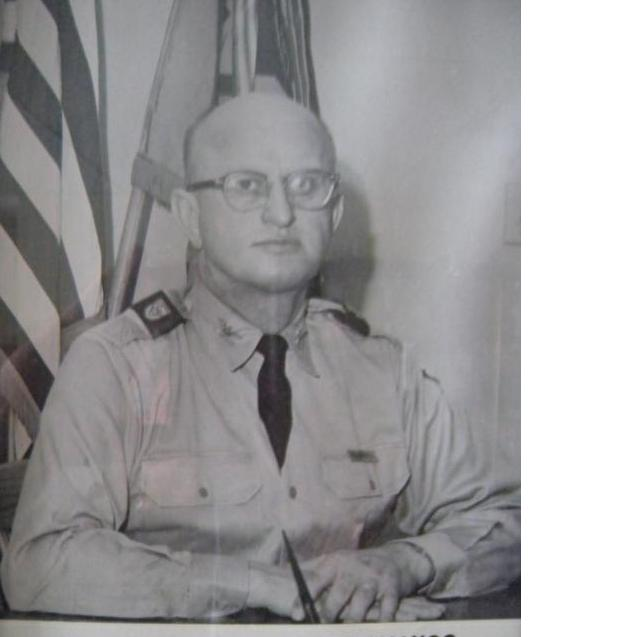

Circuit Judge of the 4th Circuit
- In office 1947–1978
- Preceded by: Ted P. Coxsey
- Succeeded by: Mahlon Gibson

Member of the Arkansas Senate from the 2nd district (Previously 5th district)
- In office January 11, 1937 – January 11, 1943
- Preceded by: Wilson Cardwell
- Succeeded by: John W. Cloer

Member of the Arkansas House of Representatives from the Washington County district
- In office January 14, 1935 – January 11, 1937

Personal details
- Born: Lincoln Maupin Cummings; June 9, 1910 Prairie Grove, Arkansas
- Died: August 12, 2000 (aged 90)
- Resting place: Prairie Grove, Arkansas
- Party: Democratic
- Education: University of Arkansas
- Occupation: Lawyer, judge

Military service
- Allegiance: United States
- Branch/service: Arkansas National Guard
- Years of service: 1940–1945
- Rank: Lieutenant colonel
- Unit: 142nd Field Artillery
- Battles/wars: World War II

Lincoln Maupin Cummings (June 9, 1910 ) was an American lawyer, judge, and politician in Fayetteville, Arkansas. He served in the Arkansas General Assembly from 1935 to 1943, in the Arkansas National Guard during World War II, and as a circuit judge for almost 30 years after returning to Fayetteville.

== Early life ==
Cummings was born June 9, 1910, in Prairie Grove, Arkansas to Hugh Douglas Cummings and Bess (née Maupin) Cummings. He had four sisters. He attended Prairie Grove School District and the University of Arkansas, and was admitted to the Arkansas Bar Association in 1934, and opened a private law practice in Fayetteville, Arkansas. Shortly thereafter, he won election to the Arkansas House of Representatives for the 50th Arkansas General Assembly. Cummings represented Washington County, Arkansas alongside Ella B. Hurst and D. E. Eicher. Following a two-year term, Cummings was elected to represent the 5th district (Washington County) the Arkansas Senate during the 51st Arkansas General Assembly. Following redistricting, he was reelected to the 2nd district (Washington and Madison counties) in the 52nd Arkansas General Assembly and 53rd Arkansas General Assembly.

He also served on the board of the Council of State Governments from 1935 to 1941.

== World War II ==
Cummings served in the Arkansas National Guard, 142nd Field Artillery from 1940 to 1945 during World War II. He served two years in Europe as an operations officer for the First Army, and as an instructor at Fort Sill in Oklahoma. Cummings graduated from the Command and General Staff School at Fort Leavenworth.

== Circuit Judge ==
Cummings served in the circuit court covering the Northwest Arkansas counties for 29 years. During the period, he dominated the judicial system of Washington County. He was a staunch Democrat and supporter of Bill Clinton during his early political career.

== Legacy ==
The road serving the Kessler Mountain Regional Park in southern Fayetteville is named Judge Cummings Road.

== See also ==
- Lee Seamster
