= 142nd Field Artillery Regiment =

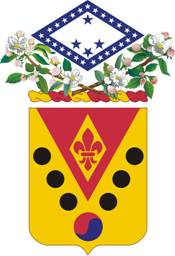
- 142nd Field Artillery Regiment Coat of arms
- Country: , United States
- Branch: Arkansas Army National Guard
- Garrison/HQ: Fayetteville, Arkansas
- Nickname: Second Arkansas (special designation)
- Motto: Try to Stop Us!
- Engagements: World War I *Streamer without inscription World War II; Korean War; Desert Storm; Iraq Campaign

Insignia
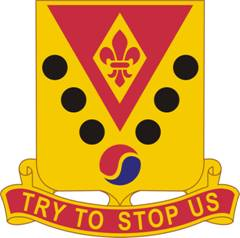
- Distinctive unit insignia

- 142nd Fires Brigade shoulder sleeve insignia

The 142nd Field Artillery Regiment ("Second Arkansas") is a United States Army field artillery regiment currently represented in the Arkansas Army National Guard by the 1st Battalion, 142nd Field Artillery, headquartered in Bentonville, Arkansas; 2nd Battalion, 142nd Field Artillery, headquartered at Fort Chaffee, Arkansas. The regiment was created in 1917 from the former 2nd Arkansas Infantry. The 142nd Field Artillery shipped to France during World War I but did not see combat before the cessation of hostilities. The regiment was activated for World War II, but its battalions were redesignated as separate battalions, 1–142nd became the 936th Field Artillery Battalion, the 2–142nd became the 937th Field Artillery Battalion. The battalion's served throughout the European Theater of Operations. The battalions were activated again for the Korean War and served throughout the war. Following the Korean War, the separate battalions resumed their former designations of 1–142nd FA and 2–142nd FA. The 142nd Field Artillery Brigade, including both battalions, was activated for Operation Desert Storm. Elements of the 142nd Fires Brigade have been activated for service in Operation Noble Eagle and Operation Iraqi Freedom. The 142nd Fires Brigade was instrumental in support and recovery operations located in New Orleans, Louisiana after hurricanes Katrina and Rita devastated the Gulf Coast.

== Origins ==
In the winter of 1892, the Arkansas State Guard conducted its first annual encampment. An encampment was also conducted in the summer of 1893 at Hot Springs. The favorable publicity for these militia encampments led to efforts to improve the organization of the Guard probably resulted in the organization of new military companies:. As Arkansas State Guard grew in the number of companies, and plans were made to divide the state into two regiments shortly after the summer encampment of 1893. The division was not made until 16 January 1894. The dividing line was the thirty-fifth parallel of latitude. The 1st Regiment, Arkansas State Guards, command by Col. F. B. T. Hohenburg, comprised the southern part of the state and a new 2nd Regiment, ASG was formed to include the northern part of the state. Companies in the 2nd Regiment (the northern division) were located at Van Buren, Magazine, Conway, Paragould, Marion, Newport, Fort Smith, Clarksville, Rector and Yellville.

Lancelot Minor, a Newport attorney who had been active in support of the Newport militia company, was appointed Colonel of the 2nd Regiment, Arkansas State Guard. Lieutenant W. R. Samples of the United States Army was assigned to the Arkansas State Guard during the period of reorganization. Lieutenant Samples wrote to Lancelot Minor, 3 January 1893:

For some time I have postponed writing you to inquire if you will accept appointment as Colonel of the 2nd Regt. of Infantry. Please consider the matter and I trust you will accept for the good of the service.

Lieutenant Samples then wrote Governor William M. Fishback, on 5 January 1894:

With your approval I shall recommend for Colonel Hon. L. Minor of Newport, who is well fitted for the office and is actively interested in the State Guard.

On 15 January, Lieutenant Samples wrote Col. Minor:

I have the honor to inform you that the Governor has today in accordance with the wishes of the officers of the 2d Regt. of Infantry, appointed you as Colonel of Infantry & you will be assigned to the comm. and of the 2d Regt.

In discussing the appointment, the Arkansas Gazette described Col. Minor as "one of the best fellows and best-known lawyers in the State". On 23 January, the Gazette reported: "Col. Minor, of Newport, detailed as Colonel of the Second Regiment of Arkansas State Guard, has assumed command and directs that all company commanders make out and forward to him at once a complete roster of their companies, stating time and place of drills." Colonel Minor appointed Lieutenant Rush H. Davis, of Company F, to serve as adjutant for the regiment, and John Frank Caldwell of Newport (and a Confederate veteran), was appointed regimental quartermaster with the rank of 2nd Regiment. On 24 March 1894, Rev. R. B. Willis, of Newport was named chaplain of the Second Regiment. In May 1894, Lieutenant George A. Hillhouse, of Newport, was appointed Major.

In early March 1894 companies began receiving complete uniforms, blankets, and Rifles. Colonel Minor and his official staff were also supplied with appropriate uniforms, including a saber, belt and shoulder straps for the colonel.

== Reorganization of 1897 ==
In January 1897, Governor Daniel W. Jones took office and appointed Brigadier General Arthur Neill as his Private Secretary and Acting Adjutant General (the position of Adjutant General had still not been reauthorized by the state legislature at this time). The new Governor and Adjutant General began a massive reorganization of the Arkansas State Guard. Two additional regiments of Infantry, another troop of cavalry, and another battery of artillery were added to the organization. The state was divided into two military districts, with the Arkansas River being the dividing line. Major General R.G. Shaver was commissioned and placed in overall command of the State's Forces. Brigadier General C. R. Shaer was commissioned and placed in command of the Southern District, which included the 1st and 2nd Infantry Regiments, two batteries of artillery and a signal company. The units were poorly equipped and outdated equipment.

Companies	Commanders	Station
Company A,	CPT S.L. Jeffers	Van Buren
Company B,		Not yet organized
Company C,	CPT B.T. Bullion	Conway
Company D,	CPT P.W. Mooss	Paragould
Company E,	CPT J.J. Cox	Marion
Company F,	CPT M.M. Stuckey	Newport
Company G,	CPT J.C. South	Mountain Home
Company H,	CPT J.E. Nichols,	Clarksville
Company I,	CPT M.D. Moody,	Judsonia
Company J,		Not yet organized
Company K,		Not yet organized
Company L	CPT R.W. Reynolds	Lake Village

== The Spanish–American War ==
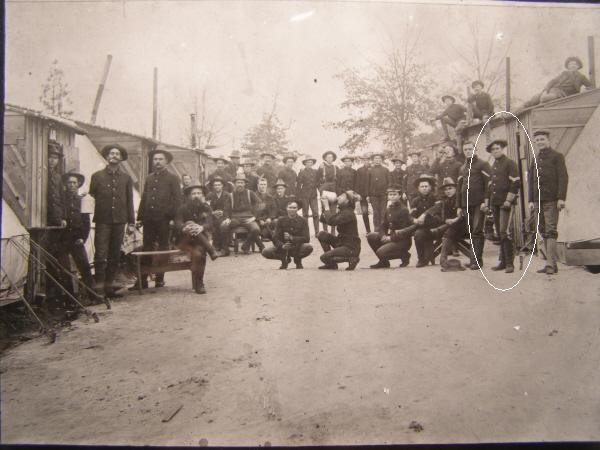
Men of the 2nd Arkansas Infantry

On 25 April 1898, President William McKinley called upon the State to supply two infantry regiments for the Spanish–American War. None of the regiments were in acceptable condition to deploy, and only two companies were determined fit to be mustered into service intact. The 1st, 2nd, 3rd, and 4th Regiments of Infantry, Arkansas State Guard, were reorganized, redesignated and mustered into Federal Service between 14 and 25 May 1898, at Little Rock as the 1st and 2nd Arkansas Volunteer Infantry for service in the Spanish–American War. Governor Jones intended that all sections of the State be represented as far as possible, so the two new regiments were created from selected State Guard companies and from different sections of the state. Pursuant to the Governor's direction the 2nd Arkansas Volunteer Infantry was organized as follows:

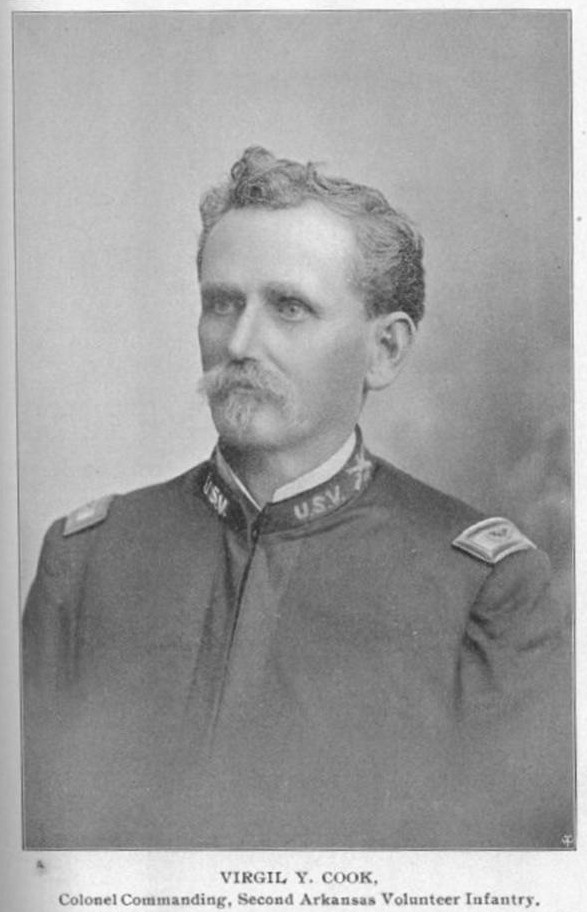
COL Virgil Y. Cook, Commander, 2nd Arkansas Volunteer Infantry

2nd Arkansas Volunteer Infantry

Company	Former Organization	Station
A	Company C, 1st Regiment, ASG (McCarthy Light Guards)	Little Rock
B	Company A, 4th Regiment, ASG, V.Y. Cook Rifles,	Batesville
C	Company G, 4th Regiment, ASG	Walnut Ridge
D	Company D, 2nd Regiment, ASG	?
E	Company D, 1st Regiment, ASG (Fletcher Rifles)	Little Rock
F	Company F, 2nd Regiment, ASG (Hurley Rifles)	?
G	Company D, 4th Regiment, ASG (Cabot Guards)	Cabot
H	Company I, 1st Regiment, ASG	Forrest City
I	Companies F, G, and H, 4th Regiment, ASG	Stuttgart (Co F), Gillett (Co G) and Dewitt (Co H)
K	Company A, 4th Regiment, ASG (Clendenin Rifles)	Harrison
L	Company C, 2nd Regiment, ASG	Conway
M	Company ?, 4th Regiment, ASG (Highland Sharpshooters)	Melbourne (with volunteers from Mountain Home)

The newly formed Arkansas Volunteer Infantry Regiments did not see combat during the Spanish–American War. The 2nd Arkansas, now under the command of COL V.Y. Cook, moved to Camp George H. Thomas at Chickamauga Park, Georgia in May 1898. The two Arkansas Volunteer Infantry Regiments were still there participating in basic training when the war effectively ended with the fall of Cuba and the signing of an armistice in early August. The 1st Arkansas Volunteer Infantry mustered out of federal service on 25 October 1899 at Little Rock, Arkansas. The 2nd Regiment continued in service until 25 February 1899, when they were mustered out at Anniston, Alabama. While the units saw no actual fighting, the deployment did have its casualties. Fifty-four Arkansas Soldiers died of disease or accident during the mobilization.

== Reorganization following the Spanish American War ==
Pursuant to an April 1899 Act of the Legislature of the State Arkansas, the 2nd Arkansas Infantry reorganized and was stationed as follows:

Regiment	Unit	Station	Commander
2nd Regiment	Headquarters	Augusta	COL J.B. Dent
	Company A,	Van Buren	CPT S.L. Jeffers
	Company B,	Not recorded	Not recorded
	Company C,	Conway	CPT B. T. Bullion
	Company D,	Paragould	CPT P.W. Moos
	Company E,	Marion	CPT J.J. Cox
	Company F,	Newport	CPT M.M. Stuckey
	Company G,	Mountain Home	CPT J.C. Smith
	Company H,	Clarksville	CPT J.E. Nichols
	Company I,	Judsonia	CPT M.D. Moody
	Company K,	Not Recorded	Not Recorded
	Company L,	Not Recorded	CPT R.W. Reynolds

== The State Guard becomes the National Guard ==
The Militia Act of 1903 (32 Stat. 775), also known as the Dick Act, organized the various state militias into the present National Guard system. The act was passed in response to the demonstrated weaknesses in the militia, and in the entire U.S. military in the Spanish–American War of 1898.

U.S. Senator Charles W. F. Dick, a Major General in the Ohio National Guard and the chair of the Committee on the Militia, sponsored the 1903 Act towards the end of the 57th U.S. Congress. Under this legislation, passed 21 January 1903, the organized militia of the states were given federal funding and required to conform to Regular Army organization within five years. The act also required National Guard units to attend twenty four drills and five days annual training a year, and, for the first time, provided for pay for annual training. In return for the increased federal funding which the act made available, militia units were subject to inspection by Regular Army officers, and had to meet certain standards.

In Arkansas, re-organization of the Arkansas State Guard actually began in 1901 under Governor Jeff Davis. Major General W.M. Maynes, in a biannual report dated 31 December 1906 provided an overview of the status of the Arkansas Militia. The Militia was subdivided by statute into parts, (1) the State Guard, or active organize militia: and (2) the Reserve Militia. The State Guard, or regularly enlisted, organized and uniformed militia, was at a total strength of 1,274 personnel. The Federal Government appropriated $35,956.86 for the support of the Arkansas State Guard in that year, and the Adjutant General asked the General Assembly for a matching appropriation of one-half the Federal appropriation.

=== Geographic reorganization ===
In 1909, a change was made in the organization of the Arkansas National Guard. For several years, the state had been organized with the 1st Infantry being stationed north of the Arkansas River and the 2nd Infantry stationed south of the river. The Adjutant General, General Green determined that the building of railroads and highways had made this stationing plan inefficient and issued General Order No 35 which reorganized the regiments and battalions and changed the letter designations of some of the companies. The regiments were re-stationed so that the 1st Infantry was situated in the eastern part of the state, with its principal "concentration point" being Little Rock, and the 2nd Infantry was stationed in the western part of the state with its "concentration point" at Fort Smith.

Regiment	Unit	Station	Officers	Enlisted
2nd Regiment	Headquarters Company,	Paris	14	6
	Company A,	Siloam Springs	3	55
	Company B,	Fayetteville	3	52
	Company C,	Dardanelle	3	71
	Company D,	Eurka Springs	3	57
	Company E,	Paris	3	63
	Company F,	Magazine	3	61
	Company G,	Hope	3	55
	Company H,	Atkins	3	61
	Company I,	Yellville	3	53
	Company K,	Fort Smith	3	42
	Company L,	Ola	3	58
	Company M,	Harrison	3	60
	2nd Regimental Band,	Russellville		27

=== Increased training with new funding ===
With the new federal funding in place National Guard units were encouraged to participate in bi-annual encampments with the Regular Army. In 1906 Arkansas sent one provisional regiment to Fort Riley, Kansas for training. In 1908 a provisional Regiment trained at Leon Springs, Texas. In 1910 Arkansas Troops were invited back to Leon Springs, Texas, for a twelve-day encampment, and the federal government provided $25,000 to defray the costs of the encampment.

Companies A-B-F-C-I and M of the Second Infantry participated in an encampment at Dardanelle, Arkansas from 9–18 August 1909. The units were trained by members of the 1st Battalion, 16th Infantry, U.S. Army.

== The Mexican Expedition ==
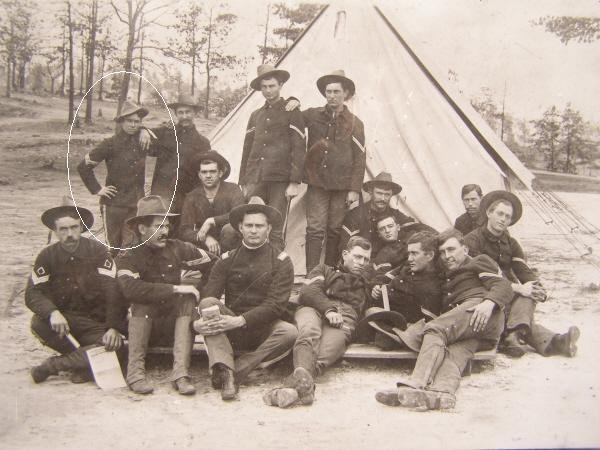
Members of the 2nd Arkansas Infantry in front of a tent

The Mexican Expedition was a military operation conducted by the United States Army against the paramilitary forces of Francisco "Pancho" Villa from 1916 to 1917. The expedition was in retaliation for Villa's illegal incursion into the United States and attack on the village of Columbus, Luna County, New Mexico, during the Mexican Revolution. The United States Army Center of Military History officially refers to the campaign as "the Mexican Expedition". The official beginning and ending dates are 14 March 1916 and 7 February 1917. National Guard units from Texas, Arizona, and New Mexico had been called into service on 8 May 1916. With congressional approval of the National Defense Act of 1916 on 3 June 1916, National Guard units from the remainder of the states and the District of Columbia were also called for duty on the border. By mid-June President Wilson had called out more than 110,000 National Guard for border service. None of the National Guard troops would cross the border into Mexico but were used instead as a show of force.

In July 1916, the entire Arkansas National Guard was mobilized for federal service on the Mexican border. Arkansas units began to assemble immediately at Fort Logan H. Roots, near Little Rock. Of the 2,078 Guardsmen that answered the call, only 1,208 passed the new physical standards for entry into federal service. The Arkansas troops received orders on 29 June to move to Deming, New Mexico in order to replace regular troops joining the actual expedition into Mexico and prepare if Mexico reacted to the incursion. The Arkansas troops were not engaged in Mexico and returned to Little Rock in February, mustering out of service 19–24 February at Fort Logan H. Roots. This mobilization of the National Guard along the Mexican border was the training ground for many future leaders of the Arkansas National Guard. Many of the officers who led Arkansas National Guard units in the early years of World War I and World War II began their service on the Mexican border. The 2nd Arkansas Infantry was mustered into federal service between 6–9 July 1916 at Fort Logan H. Roots, Arkansas; and mustered out of federal service on 9 March 1917 at Fort Logan H. Roots, Arkansas.

== World War I ==
=== Mobilization ===
When the United States declared war on Germany 6 April 1917, less than two months had passed since the last Arkansas National Guard units completed mustering out from duty on the Mexican border. By 4 April 1917 the 2nd Arkansas Regiment was on 48-hour standby, but had not received mobilization orders. On 18 May 1917 the Arkansas National Guard was notified that on 5 August 1917 the Guard as a whole would be called into federal service.

The Arkansas National Guard was initially informed that its units would be assigned to the 18th Division, along with the states of Mississippi and Louisiana, and the state was directed to raise one regiment of infantry, one regiment of field artillery, and one outpost of company signal corps. The men of the Arkansas National Guard trained hard after hearing the news. Intensified cross-country hiking, drilling, and maneuvering were evident when the men took sack lunches and marched into Little Rock for the Memorial Day parade with all other troops stationed at Ft. Root.

By 16 July 1917 the 2nd Arkansas Infantry included the following units:

Regiment	Unit	Station	Officers	Enlisted
2nd Regiment	Company A,	Springdale	3	141
	Company B,	Fayetteville	3	150
	Company C,	Dardanelle	3	115
	Company D,	Fort Smith	3	140
	Company E,	Paris	1	140
	Company G,	Russellville	3	140
	Company H,	Bentonville	2	150
	Company I,	Texarkana	2	119
	Company K,	Ozark	3	120
	Company L,	Ola	3	129
	Company M,	Harrison	3	100
	Headquarters Company,	Paris	2	59
	Supply Company,	Van Buren	3	39
	Machine Gun Company,	Fort Smith	3	71
	Medical Corps,	Little Rock	8	32

On 18 July 1917, the Arkansas National Guard was assigned to Alexandria, Louisiana, for training as the 18th Division. Alexandria, Louisiana, is the location of Camp Beauregard. The camp was named after General P. G. T. Beauregard, C.A.A.

The 2nd and 3rd Infantry Regiments were examined for federal service on 6 August 1917 at Ft. Brough (located on the Capitol grounds). The regiments, under the control of General Wood, were sent to Ft. Roots and moved to Camp Pike by 24 August 1917. The commander of the supply company of the 3rd Arkansas received instructions from the Augusta Arsenal to go into the open market and buy mess kits to complete the needed equipment for the new regiments.

=== Movement to Camp Beauregard ===
In late September 1917, the Arkansas National Guard moved by train to Camp Beauregard in Alexandria, Louisiana. The trip took about fourteen hours.

=== Re-numbering and loss of state designations ===
The Arkansas troops were demobilized after their transfer to Camp Beauregard, and reorganization of the troops was made under a new national numbering system. The 18th Division was redesignated as the 39th Division. At this time all National Guard Units were stripped of their state designations and re-numbered under a new federal numbering system:

- The 2nd Arkansas Infantry Regiment, minus its machine gun company became the 142nd Field Artillery Regiment,

The 39th "Delta" Division was composed of the:

- 77th Infantry Brigade (153rd Infantry, 154th Infantry, and the 141st Machine Gun Battalion);
- the 78th Infantry Brigade (155th Infantry, 156th Infantry, 142nd Machine Gun Battalion);
- 64th Field Artillery Brigade (140th Field Artillery, 141st Field Artillery, 142nd Field Artillery, and the 114th Trench Mortar Battery);
- The Divisional Troops (140th Machine Gun Battalion, 114th Engineers, 114th Field Signal Battalion and Headquarters Troop); and,
- Trains (114th Train Headquarters and Military Police, 114th Ammunition Train, 114th Supply Train, 114th Engineer Train, and the 114th Sanitary Train. The 39th Division was brought up to strength with the addition of soldiers from Ohio, Illinois and Kentucky.

When the 2nd Arkansas Infantry Regiment was changed to artillery, their blue hat cords were changed to red, and their collar insignia was changed from the crossed rifles to crossed cannon. But the big change was from the rifle to the six-inch howitzer, which was used in shelling enemy positions. It took eight horses to pull one of the big cannons. After several months of classroom training, the 142nd began live fire on the horse-drawn 4.7 inch weapon in April 1918. After two and one-half months in the field conducting live-fire training, the 142nd was certified for overseas service.

Sickness was a problem for the men from Arkansas. Measles in the latter part of October 1917 kept the men from drilling. Regardless, in January 1918 the National Guard Reserve was transferred to the active list. Also in the same month, Alexandria, Louisiana, was placed off limits, and soldiers could not visit other regiments because of an outbreak of meningitis. Soldiers were instructed in the use of deadly gases and then exposed to tear gas. The off limits lasted until 6 March 1918 for the soldiers concerning Alexandria. The soldiers complained about the bugs and were anxious to go to France. By March 1918 the soldiers had received new Enfield rifles. In early October 1918, Camp Beauregard was struck with Spanish influenza which led into lobar pneumonia. All available facilities were used when the hospitals became overcrowded.

Arkansas troops passed in review for the first time in February for Arkansas Adjutant-General England, and the entire 39th Division passed in review in April for the Governors of Mississippi and Louisiana. On the day after the parade, the Arkansas soldiers learned that they could not vote outside of the state of Arkansas. If they could return to their local residence before or on the voting date, they could vote according to the Attorney-General's opinion.

=== Deployed to France ===
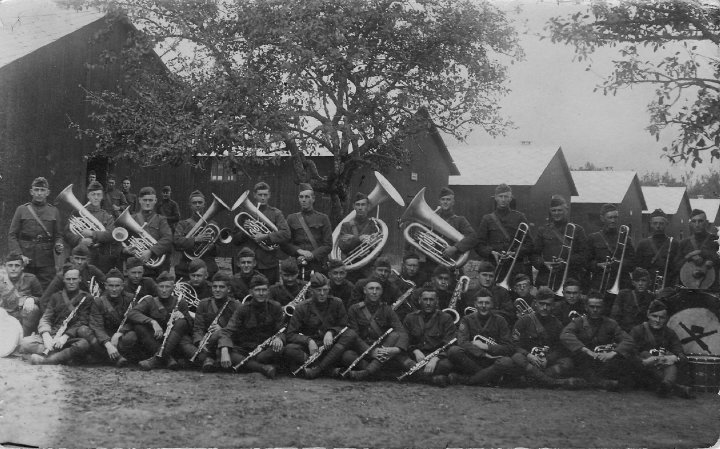
142nd Field Artillery Regimental Band, in France, 1918

In the summer of 1918, the need for replacements for the divisions already engaged in combat drove the army to offer the enlisted soldiers of the 39th Division the choice to volunteer to deploy early or to remain in training with the Division. Many soldiers, concerned that they might miss the opportunity to prove themselves in combat, volunteered; thus, June 1918 marked the arrival in France of twenty percent of the enlisted personnel of the 142nd Field Artillery. The number of volunteers had been limited to not more than twenty per cent of each organization, and the officers could not accompany their troops, but had to remain at Camp Beauregard with the remainder of the division still in training. At Camp Beauregard, the division was brought to full strength by the arrival of troops from Camp Zachary Taylor (men from the states of Ohio, Illinois, and Kentucky.)

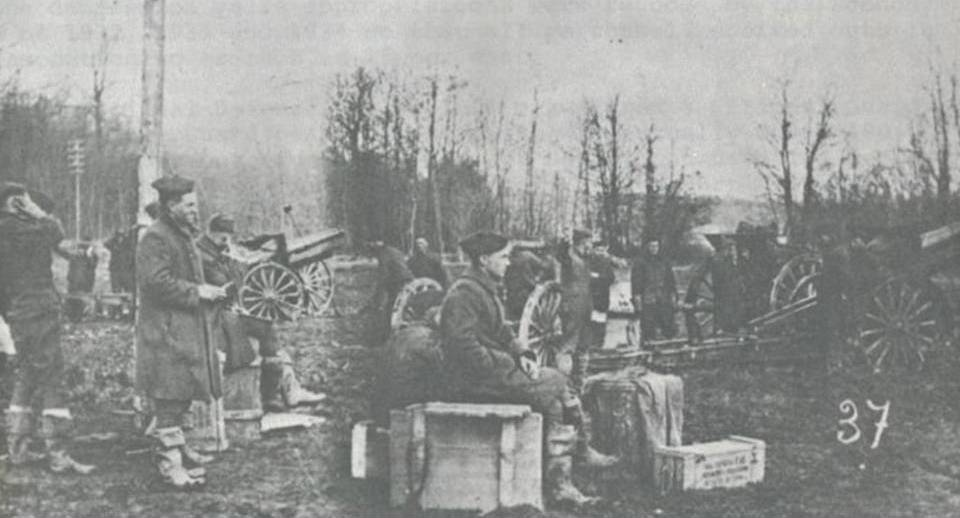
Battery A, 1st Battalion, 142nd Artillery firing in support of the Artillery School at Du Valdahon, France, 1919

It took twelve months for the 39th Division organization to reach France, where it remained for three months. The 142nd Field Artillery Regiment sailed for France on 31 August 1918 and arrived 7 September. After arrival in France, the 142nd drew equipment and began training on the tractor-drawn 155 mm howitzer. The 142nd was certified for combat 8 November 1918, and the Armistice was signed on the 11th, preventing the 142nd from participating in combat.

In March 1919, the 1st Battalion, 142nd Artillery, 39th Division was acting as a school battalion for the entire artillery forces of the American Expeditionary Forces with their headquarters at Valdahon, France.

=== Demobilization ===
The 142nd stayed in France to conduct tests and exercises to develop techniques for motorized artillery battalions and won a commendation for efficient performance. In May 1919 word reached Little Rock that the 142nd Field Artillery (old 2nd Arkansas) was doing convoy duty with the Army of Occupation and a segment was still firing for the Artillery School at Camp Valdahon. It was not until early June when the 142nd Field Artillery left France on the transport Amphion to arrive 15 June 1919 at Newport News, Virginia. On the train trip to Little Rock, the 142nd Field Artillery was asked to march in a parade in Atlanta. This they were proud to do. On 21 June 1919, the group arrived at Camp Pike. On the following day the 142nd Field Artillery was featured in a big parade in Little Rock and then treated to a big show and picnic in the park.

== Between the World Wars ==
In 1921, the 142nd Field Artillery Regiment was constituted in the National Guard as a 75 mm gun regiment, assigned to the GHQ Reserve, and allotted to the state of Arkansas. On 2 July 1923, the unit was placed on the Deferred National Guard list and redesignated as the 419th Field Artillery Regiment (DNG). It was withdrawn from the National Guard and demobilized on 17 September 1927 without ever being organized. On 16 June 1931, the state was authorized to reconstitute the 142nd Field Artillery. in the GHQ Reserve. Several of the new 142nd batteries were organized from the 206th Coast Artillery. In 1929, the War Department made the decision to return 155 mm howitzer regiments to infantry divisions to give them additional firepower to supplement their two regiments of 75 mm guns, as the development of a 105 mm howitzer as the standard medium divisional artillery piece to replace the 75 mm gun had stalled because of lack of funding. Since 1922, the state of Nebraska had been unable to organize the VII Corps' 127th Field Artillery Regiment, intended to be reassigned to the 35th Division, so on 13 July 1931, the allotment of the 142nd Field Artillery Regiment was changed from 75 mm guns to 155 mm howitzers, and it was assigned to the 35th Division as its heavy field artillery regiment on the same date.

New unit	Former unit	Station	Federal recognition dates
Headquarters, 1st Battalion, 142nd FA	New Unit	Prescott	26 June 1931
Headquarters Battery and Combat Train	New Unit	Haze	26 June 1931
Battery A	Battery H, 206th CA	Fayetteville	2 September 1931
Battery B	Battery E, 206th CA	Fayetteville	2 September 1931
Battery C	Battery G, 206th CA	Fort Smith	20 April 1936
Medical Detachment	New Unit	Hot Springs	26 June 1931

On 3 April 1936, the war department authorized the creation of the 2nd Battalion, 142nd Field Artillery as follows:

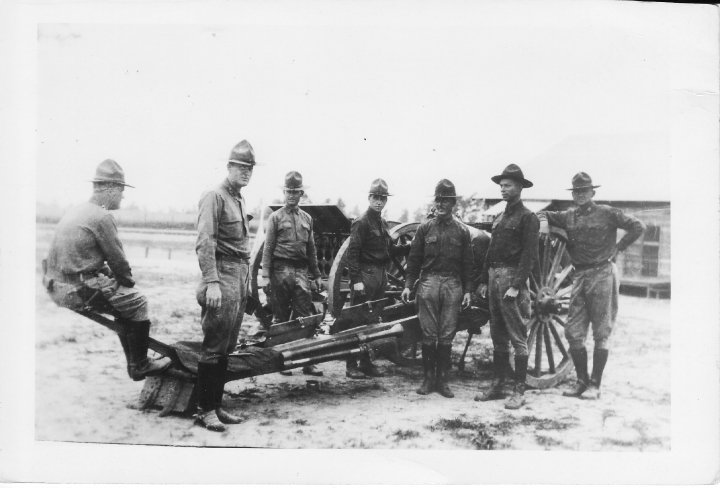
Howitzer Section from Battery A, 142nd Field Artillery Regiment, training at Fort Sill, Oklahoma, 1930s

New unit	Former unit	Station	Federal recognition dates
Headquarters, 2nd Battalion, 142nd FA	New Unit	Hot Springs	3 April 1936
Headquarters Battery and Combat Train	New Unit	Fort Smith	26 June 1931
Battery C	New Unit	Mena	26 June 1931
Medical Detachment	New Unit	Fort Smith	26 June 1931

On 6 March 1937, the War Department authorized the creation the following additional units for the 142nd Field Artillery Regiment:

New unit	Former unit	Station	Federal recognition dates
Headquarters, 3rd Battalion, 142nd FA	New Unit	Fayetteville	6 March 1937
Battery E	New Unit	Paris	6 March 1937
Battery F	New Unit	Rogers	6 March 1937
Service Battery	New Unit	Harrison	6 March 1937
Band Section	New Unit	Fort Smith	6 March 1937

The former Company B, 2d Regiment of Infantry, was reorganized and federally recognized on 4 December 1923 in the Arkansas National Guard at Fayetteville as Battery A, 206th Artillery (Coast Artillery Corps). It was redesignated on 22 April 1924 as Battery A, 206th Coast Artillery. It converted and was redesignated on 3 September 1931 as Battery A, 142d Field Artillery.

== World War II ==
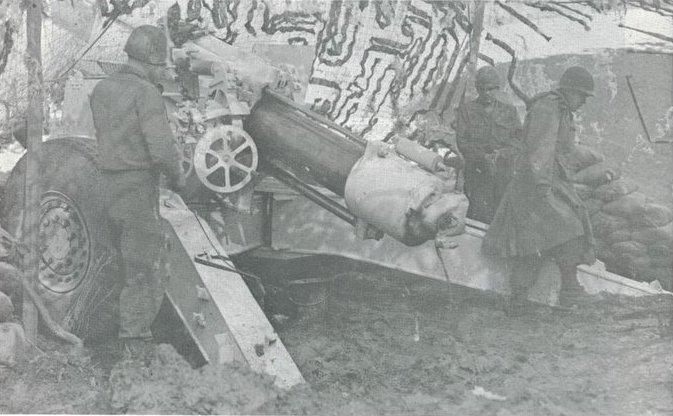
Brigadier General H.D. Jay fires the 125,000th round from the 936th Field Artillery Battalion (formerly 1–142nd Field Artillery). The round was fired from Gun 1, Battery B, on 8 February 1945.

On 21 October 1940, after the organization of the 127th Field Artillery Regiment in the 35th Division by the conversion of the 114th Cavalry Regiment, Kansas National Guard, the 142nd Field Artillery Regiment was relieved from assignment to the 35th Division and assigned to the GHQ Reserve. The 142nd Field Artillery Regiment was ordered into active federal service on 6 January 1941 and moved to Fort Sill, Oklahoma, where the 3rd Battalion was disbanded. In February the regiment moved to Camp Bowie, Texas and began extensive training. On 25 February 1943, the 142nd Field Artillery Regiment was disbanded. The headquarters was redesignated the 142nd Field Artillery Group, the 1st Battalion became the 936th Field Artillery Battalion, and the 2nd Battalion became the 937th Field Artillery Battalion. These were independent battalions equipped with the 155 mm howitzer.

The 142nd Field Artillery Group left Camp Bowie 25 September 1943 and arrived in England on 3 November 1943. It crossed Utah Beach 10 June 1944 and participated in the European offensive with up to five battalions attached. When the war ended the 142nd Field Artillery Group was twenty-five miles from the Elbe River.

The 936th Field Artillery Battalion left Camp Bowie 9 August 1943, arrived in Algiers 2 September 1943 and landed in Naples, Italy 11 November 1943. It participated in the drive across the Rapido River, the liberation of Rome and the assault on Mount Cassino. When the war ended the 936th was across the Po River, about forty-five miles from Venice. It had fired 139,364 rounds in combat and was awarded battle streamers for the following campaigns:

- Naples-Foggia,
- Rome-Arno,
- North Apennines, and
- Po Valley.

The 937th Field Artillery Battalion left Camp Bowie on 10 August 1943, arrived in Algiers 2 September 1943 and landed in Naples, Italy 11 November 1943. It participated in the drive across the Rapido River and the liberation of Rome. It then prepared for and participated in the amphibious landings in southern France on 15 August 1944. One of the vessels carrying the 937th FAB was hit by a German bomber, resulting in one killed in action, two missing in action, eighty-three wounded and the loss of the fire-direction equipment and one battery of howitzers. The 937th fired over 200,000 combat rounds and was awarded battle streamers for the following campaigns:

- Naples-Foggio,
- Rome-Arno,
- Southern France, (with arrowhead)
- Rhineland, and
- Central Europe

== Reorganization following World War II ==
Following World War II, the 142nd Field Artillery Group was reorganized in the Arkansas Guard, consisting of 6 battalions: 3 artillery battalions and 3 antiaircraft artillery battalions.

Headquarters	Company	Station
142nd Field Artillery Group	Headquarters and Headquarters Battery	Fayetteville
709th FA Battalion	Headquarters and Headquarters Battery	Paragould
	Battery A	Rector
	Battery B	Augusta
	Battery C	Piggott
	Service Battery, 437th FA	Wynne
936th Field Artillery Battalion	Headquarters and Headquarters Battery	Fayetteville
	Battery A	Bentonville
	Battery B	Berryville
	Battery C	Rogers
	Service Battery	Harrison
	Medical Detachment	Fayetteville
937th Field Artillery Battalion	Headquarters and Headquarters Battery	Fort Smith
	Battery A	Mena
	Battery B	Paris
	Battery C	Ozark
	Service Battery	Mena
	Medical Detachment	Ozark
151st Anti Aircraft Artillery Battalion	Headquarters and Headquarters Battery	Harrison
	Battery A	Mountain Home
	Battery B	Berryville
	Battery C	Marshall
	Battery D	Harrison
	Medical Detachment	Harrison
326th Anti Aircraft Artillery Battalion	Headquarters and Headquarters Battery	West Memphis
	Battery A	Marked Tree
	Battery B	West Memphis
	Battery C	Harrisburg
	Battery D	West Helena
	Medical Detachment	Marked Tree
327th Anti Aircraft Artillery Battalion	Headquarters and Headquarters Battery	Jonesboro
	Battery A	Jonesboro
	Battery B	Jonesboro
	Battery C	Jonesboro
	Battery D	Jonesboro
	Medical Detachment	Jonesboro

== The Korean War ==
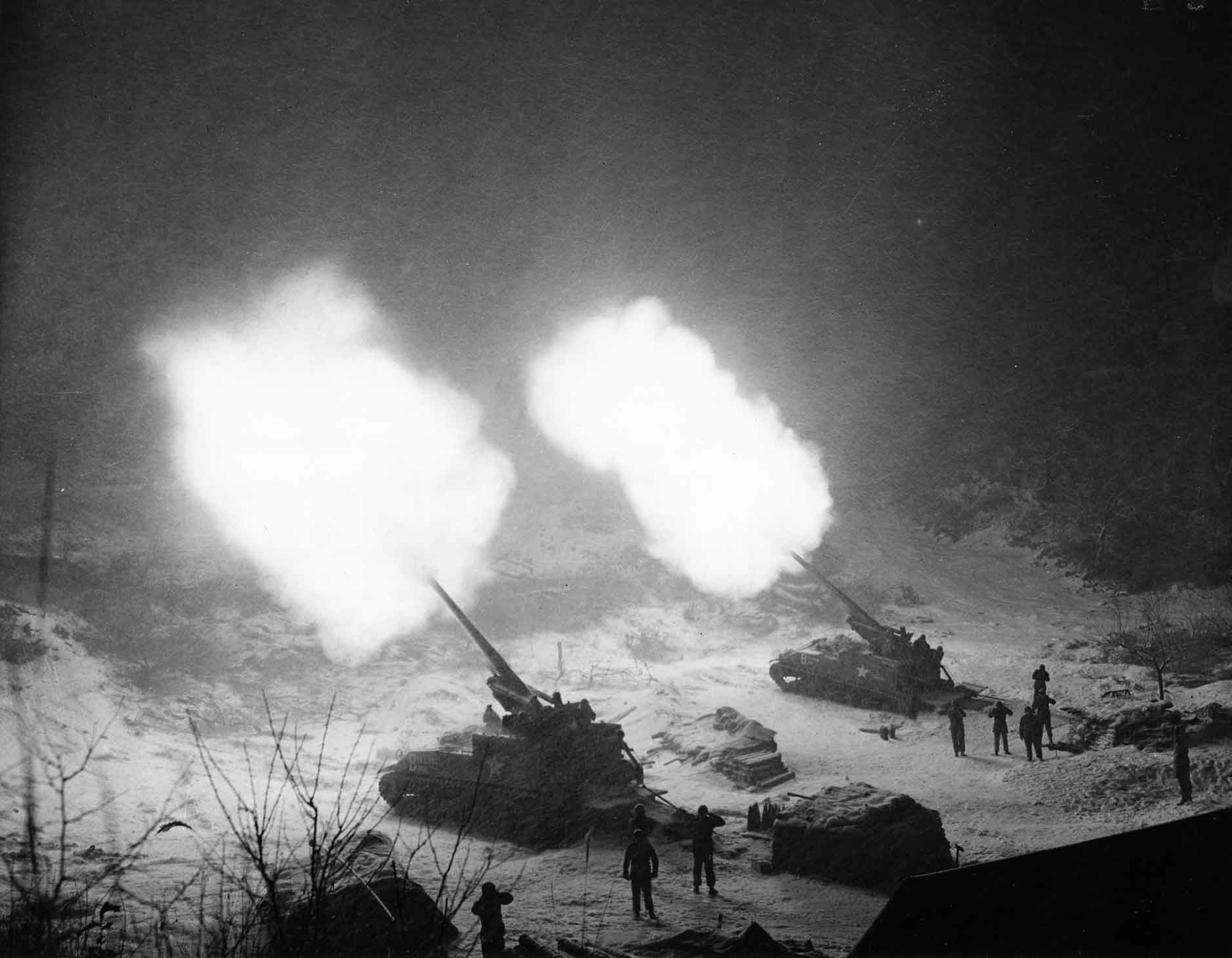
A pair of M-40 155 mm Gun Motor Carriages of Battery B, 937th Field Artillery Battalion, from Paris Arkansas, providing fire support to U.S. Army 25th Infantry Division, Munema, Korea, 26 November 1951

The Headquarters and Headquarters Battery, 142nd FA Group consolidated with Battery B, 936th Field Artillery Battalion, and the consolidated unit reorganized and was federally recognized on 24 October 1946 at Fayetteville as Headquarters and Headquarters Battery, 142d Field Artillery Group. It was ordered into active federal service on 3 September 1950 at Fayetteville. It was released on 17 December 1954 from active federal service and reverted to state control.

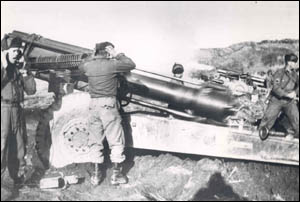
936th Field Artillery Battalion firing in South Korea in 1951

The 936th Field Artillery Battalion mobilized 2 August 1950 and moved to Camp Carson, Colorado for training. It arrived in Korea 10 February 1951 and fired its first combat mission 30 March 1951. The unit provided fire support to 3rd Infantry Division 25th Infantry Division and 1st Republic of Korea Division as well as the 1st Cavalry Division. The battalion was awarded battle streamers for the following campaigns: First United Nations (UN) Counteroffensive; CCF Spring Offensive; UN Spring Offensive; UN Summer-Fall Offensive; and Second Korean winter. The 936th fired 348,547 combat rounds in Korea and suffered ten killed in action and twenty-eight wounded in action. The battalion was inactivated 25 September 1954.

The 937th Field Artillery Battalion was mobilized on the same day as the 936th and moved to Fort Hood, Texas for training. It arrived in Korea on the same ship as the 936th and fired its first combat mission 3 April 1951. The battalion went into line with the I Corps on 30 April near Uijongbu, Korea. During the Chinese Spring Drive, the battalion fell back to Seoul and was moved to IX Corps. Battery A continued with X Corps and was attached to the 1st Marine Division. On 17 May 1952 the battalion was attached to 2nd Infantry Division, IX Corps. For the action with 2nd Division, Battery C and Headquarters Battery received the Distinguished Unit Citation. The battalion continued in general support to IX Corps from 28 July 1953 until 9 October 1954. The battalion was awarded battle streamers for the following campaigns: First U.N. Counteroffensive; CCF Spring Offensive; UN Spring Offensive; UN Summer-Fall Offensive; Second Korean Winter; Korea, Summer-Fall 1952; Third Korean Winter and Korea, Summer 1953. The 937th fired 223,400 combat rounds in Korea and suffered thirteen killed in action and 156 wounded in action. The battalion was inactivated 26 November 1954.

== The Cold War ==
Following the Korean War, the 936th Field Artillery Battalion and the 937th Field Artillery Battalion were reorganized and redesignated as the 1st and 2nd Battalions, 142nd Field Artillery. The 142nd Field Artillery was ordered into active federal service, along with all other Arkansas National Guard troops in the state on 24 September 1957 at Fayetteville in support of the Little Rock Central High School integration crisis. The unit remained at home stations and did not deploy to Little Rock during the Central High crisis. The unit was released on 23 October 1957 from active federal service and reverted to state control.

=== Reorganization of 1959 ===
In accordance with General Order Number 4, dated 29 May 1959, the 142nd Field Artillery was reorganized as follows:

New Unit	Former Unit	Station	Federal Recognition Dates
HQ and HQ Battery, 142nd Artillery	HQ and HQ Battery, 142nd Artillery	Fayetteville	24 October 1946
HQ and HQ Battery, 1st Battalion, (155mm)(Towed) 142nd Artillery	HQ and HQ Battery, 936th Artillery	Fayetteville	24 October 1946
Medical Detachment, 1st Battalion, (155mm)(Towed) 142nd Artillery	Medical Detachment, 936th Artillery	Fayetteville	1947
Battery A, 1st Battalion, (155mm)(Towed) 142nd Artillery	Battery A, 936th Artillery Battalion	Bentonville	1947
Battery B, 1st Battalion, (155mm)(Towed) 142nd Artillery	Battery B, 936th Artillery Battalion	Siloam Springs	6 February 1956
Battery C, 1st Battalion, (155mm)(Towed) 142nd Artillery	Battery C, 936th Artillery Battalion	Rogers	24 February 1946
Service Battery, 1st Battalion, (155mm)(Towed) 142nd Artillery	Service Battery, 936th Artillery Battalion	Lincoln	12 December 1955
HQ and HQ Battery, 2nd Battalion, (8 inch)(SP) 142nd Artillery	HQ and HQ Battery, 937th Artillery	Fort Smith	23 October 1946
Battery A, 2nd Battalion, (8 inch)(SP) 142nd Artillery	Company C, 212th Signal Battalion	Van Buren	28 November 1955
Battery B, 2nd Battalion, (8 inch)(SP) 142nd Artillery	Battery B, 937th Artillery Battalion	Paris	23 October 1946
Battery C, 2nd Battalion, (8 inch)(SP) 142nd Artillery	Battery C, 937th Artillery Battalion, (Med Det, 937th FA)	Ozark	3 February 1947
Service Battery, 2nd Battalion, (8 inch)(SP) 142nd Artillery	233rd Med Company	Charleston	1 December 1955
HQ and HQ Battery, 3rd Battalion, (155mm)(Towed) 142nd Artillery	HQ and HQ Battery, 151st AAA BN (Battery D, 151st AAA BN)	Harrison	30 November 1955
Medical Detachment, 3rd Battalion, (155mm)(Towed) 142nd Artillery	Medical Detachment, 151st AAA BN	Harrison	23 January 1957
Battery A, 3rd Battalion, (155mm)(Towed) 142nd Artillery	Battery A, 151st AAA BN	Mountain Home	21 November 1955
Battery B, 3rd Battalion, (155mm)(Towed) 142nd Artillery	Battery B, 151st AAA BN	Berryville	7 December 1955
Battery C, 3rd Battalion, (155mm)(Towed) 142nd Artillery	Company B, 212th Sig BN	Springdale	21 June 1955
Service Battery, 3rd Battalion, (155mm)(Towed) 142nd Artillery	Battery C, 151st AAA	Marshall	21 February 1956
HQ and HQ Battery, 4th Battalion, (8 inch)(SP) 142nd Artillery	HQ and HQ Battery, 709th Artillery Battalion	Paragould	19 May 1955
Battery A, 4th Battalion, (8 inch)(SP) 142nd Artillery	Battery A, 326th AAA Battalion (Med Det, 326th AAA BN)	Marked Tree	20 July 1955
Battery B, 4th Battalion, (8 inch)(SP) 142nd Artillery	Company M, 153rd Infantry	Blytheville	30 January 1947
Battery C, 4th Battalion, (8 inch)(SP) 142nd Artillery	Battery C, 709th Artillery Battalion	Piggott	19 September 1955
Service Battery, 4th Battalion, (8 inch)(SP) 142nd Artillery	Battery A, 709th Artillery Battalion	Rector	24 May 1955
HQ and HQ Battery, 5th Battalion, (155mm)(SP) 142nd Artillery	HQ and HQ Battery, 326th AAA BN	West Memphis	22 June 1955
Medical Detachment, 5th Battalion, (155mm)(SP) 142nd Artillery	None	West Memphis	1 June 1959
Battery A, 5th Battalion, (155mm)(SP) 142nd Artillery	Service Battery, 445th Artillery Battalion (Service Battery, 709th FA BN)	Wynne	29 January 1947
Battery B, 5th Battalion, (155mm)(SP) 142nd Artillery	Battery B, 445th Artillery Battalion	Forrest City	19 November 1946
Battery C, 5th Battalion, (155mm)(SP) 142nd Artillery	Battery B, 709th Artillery Battalion	Augusta	20 June 1955
Service Battery, 5th Battalion, (155mm)(SP) 142nd Artillery	Battery B, 326th AAA BN	West Memphis	14 February 1956

=== Reorganization of 1963 ===
The Headquarters was redesignated on 1 June 1959 as Headquarters and Headquarters Battery, 142d Artillery Group. In 1963 the group was expanded to include five battalions. However the 3rd Battalion, became an element of the 39th Infantry Division Artillery.

New Unit	Former Unit	Station
HQ and HQ Battery, 142nd Artillery Group (With Aviation Section)	HQ and HQ Battery, 142nd Artillery Group	Fayetteville
HQ and HQ Battery, 1st Battalion, (155mm)(Towed) 142nd Artillery(With Aviation Section)	HQ and HQ Battery, 1st Battalion, (155mm)(Towed) 142nd Artillery	Fayetteville
Battery A, 1st Battalion, (155mm)(Towed) 142nd Artillery	Battery A, 1st Battalion, (155mm)(Towed) 142nd Artillery	Bentonville
Battery B, 1st Battalion, (155mm)(Towed) 142nd Artillery	Battery B, 1st Battalion, (155mm)(Towed) 142nd Artillery	Siloam Springs
Battery C, 1st Battalion, (155mm)(Towed) 142nd Artillery	Battery C, 1st Battalion, (155mm)(Towed) 142nd Artillery	Rogers
Service Battery, 1st Battalion, (155mm)(Towed) 142nd Artillery	Service Battery, 1st Battalion, (155mm)(Towed) 142nd Artillery	Lincoln
HQ and HQ Battery, 2nd Battalion, (8 inch)(SP) 142nd Artillery	HQ and HQ Battery, 2nd Battalion, (8 inch)(SP) 142nd Artillery	Fort Smith
Battery A, 2nd Battalion, (8 inch)(SP) 142nd Artillery	Battery A, 2nd Battalion, (8 inch)(SP) 142nd Artillery	Van Buren
Battery B, 2nd Battalion, (8 inch)(SP) 142nd Artillery	Battery B, 2nd Battalion, (8 inch)(SP) 142nd Artillery	Paris
Battery C, 2nd Battalion, (8 inch)(SP) 142nd Artillery	Battery C, 2nd Battalion, (8 inch)(SP) 142nd Artillery	Ozark
Service Battery, 2nd Battalion, (8 inch)(SP) 142nd Artillery	Service Battery, 2nd Battalion, (8 inch)(SP) 142nd Artillery	Charleston
HQ and HQ Service Battery, 3rd Battalion, (105mm)(Towed) 142nd Artillery	HQ and HQ Battery, 3rd Battalion, 142nd Artillery	Harrison
Battery A, 3rd Battalion, (155mm)(Towed) 142nd Artillery	Battery A, 3rd Battalion, (105mm)(Towed) 142nd Artillery	Mountain Home
Battery B, 3rd Battalion, (105mm)(Towed) 142nd Artillery	Battery B, 3rd Battalion, (155mm)(Towed) 142nd Artillery	Berryville
Battery C, 3rd Battalion, (105mm)(Towed) 142nd Artillery	Battery C, 3rd Battalion, (155mm)(Towed) 142nd Artillery	Springdale
HQ and HQ Battery, 4th Battalion, (8 inch)(SP) 142nd Artillery	HQ and HQ Battery, 4th Battalion, (8 inch)(SP) 142nd Artillery	Paragould
Battery A, 4th Battalion, (8 inch)(SP) 142nd Artillery	Battery A, 4th Battalion, (8 inch)(SP) 142nd Artillery	Marked Tree
Battery B, 4th Battalion, (8 inch)(SP) 142nd Artillery	Battery B, 4th Battalion, (8 inch)(SP) 142nd Artillery	Blytheville
Battery C, 4th Battalion, (8 inch)(SP) 142nd Artillery	Battery C, 4th Battalion, (8 inch)(SP) 142nd Artillery	Piggott
Service Battery, 4th Battalion, (8 inch)(SP) 142nd Artillery	Service Battery, 4th Battalion, (8 inch)(SP) 142nd Artillery	Rector
HQ and HQ Battery, 5th Battalion, (105mm)(Towed) 142nd Artillery (With Aviation Section)	HQ and HQ Battery, 5th Battalion, (155mm)(SP) 142nd Artillery	West Memphis
Battery A, 5th Battalion, (105mm)(Towed) 142nd Artillery	Battery A, 5th Battalion, (155mm)(SP) 142nd Artillery	Wynne
Battery B, 5th Battalion, (105mm)(Towed) 142nd Artillery	Battery B, 5th Battalion, (155mm)(SP) 142nd Artillery	Forrest City
Battery C, 5th Battalion, (105mm)(Towed) 142nd Artillery	Battery C, 5th Battalion, (155mm)(SP) 142nd Artillery	Augusta
Service Battery, 5th Battalion, (105mm)(SP) 142nd Artillery	Service Battery, 5th Battalion, (155mm)(SP) 142nd Artillery	West Memphis

=== Reorganization of 1967 ===
On 2 November 1967, in accordance with National Guard Bureau Memo NG-AROTO 1002-01, the 142nd Field Artillery Group was again reorganized, to consist of the 1st and 2nd Battalions, with the 3rd, 4th and 5th Battalions being reorganized and redesignated as follows:

New Unit	Former Unit	Station
HQ and HQ Service Battery (Minus Radar Section, Metro Section, Communications Platoon, 5th Battalion, 206th Artillery	HQ and HQ Battery, 5th Battalion, (105mm)(Towed) 142nd Artillery (With Aviation Section) & Service Battery, 5th Battalion, (105mm)(SP) 142nd Artillery	West Memphis
Det 1, HQ and HQ Service Battery (Radar Section, Metro Section, Communications Platoon, 5th Battalion, 206th Artillery	HQ and HQ Battery, 3rd Battalion, 206th Artillery (Honest John)	Marianna
Battery A, 5th Battalion, (105mm)(Towed) 206th Artillery	Battery A, 5th Battalion, (105mm)(Towed) 142nd Artillery	Wynne
Battery B, 5th Battalion, (105mm)(Towed) 206th Artillery	Battery B, 5th Battalion, (105mm)(Towed) 142nd Artillery	Forrest City
Battery C, 5th Battalion, (105mm)(Towed) 206th Artillery	Battery C, 5th Battalion, (105mm)(Towed) 142nd Artillery	Harrisburg
HQ and HQ Battery, 142nd Artillery Group (With Aviation Section)	HQ and HQ Battery, 142nd Artillery Group	Fayetteville
HQ and HQ Battery (Minus LN Section, Commo Platoon, and AVN Section), 2nd Battalion, (8 inch)(SP) 142nd Artillery	HQ and HQ Battery, 2nd Battalion, (8 inch)(SP) 142nd Artillery	Fort Smith
Det 1, HQ and HQ Battery (LN Section, Commo Platoon, and AVN Section), 2nd Battalion, (8 inch)(SP) 142nd Artillery	Service Battery, 2nd Battalion, (8 inch)(SP) 142nd Artillery	Charleston
Battery A, 2nd Battalion, (8 inch)(SP) 142nd Artillery	Battery A, 2nd Battalion, (8 inch)(SP) 142nd Artillery	Van Buren
Battery B, 2nd Battalion, (155mm)(Towed) 142nd Artillery	Battery B, 1st Battalion, (155mm)(Towed) 142nd Artillery	Siloam Springs
Battery C, 2nd Battalion, (8 inch)(SP) 142nd Artillery	Battery C, 2nd Battalion, (8 inch)(SP) 142nd Artillery	Ozark
Service Battery, 2nd Battalion, (8 inch)(SP) 142nd Artillery	Service Battery, 1st Battalion, (155mm)(Towed) 142nd Artillery	Lincoln
HQ and HQ Battery (Minus Battery HQ, Admins Section, Survey Section, LN Section, and Medical Section), 1st Battalion, (105mm)(Towed) 142nd Artillery	HQ and HQ Service Battery, 3rd Battalion, (105mm)(Towed) 142nd Artillery	Harrison
Det 1, HQ and HQ Battery (Battery HQ, Admins Section, Survey Section, LN Section, and Medical Section), 1st Battalion, (105mm)(Towed) 142nd Artillery	HQ and HQ Battery, 1st Battalion, (155mm)(Towed) 142nd Artillery(With Aviation Section)	Fayetteville
Battery A, 1st Battalion, (105mm)(Towed) 142nd Artillery	Battery A, 1st Battalion, (155mm)(Towed) 142nd Artillery	Bentonville
Battery B, 1st Battalion, (105mm)(Towed) 142nd Artillery	Battery C, 3rd Battalion, (105mm)(Towed) 142nd Artillery	Springdale
Battery C, 1st Battalion, (105mm)(Towed) 142nd Artillery	Battery C, 1st Battalion, (155mm)(Towed) 142nd Artillery	Rogers
Service Battery, 1st Battalion, (105mm)(Towed) 142nd Artillery	Battery B, 3rd Battalion, (105mm)(Towed) 142nd Artillery	Berryville
Det 1, HQ and HQ Company (Intel Section, Support Section, Commo Section, Equipment Section, and BN Medical Section, 875th Engineer Battalion (Combat)	HQ and HQ Battery, 4th Battalion, (8 inch)(SP) 142nd Artillery	Paragould
Company C (Minus 2nd and 3rd Engineer Platoon), 875th Engineer Battalion (Combat)	Battery A, 4th Battalion, (8 inch)(SP) 142nd Artillery	Marked Tree
Company D (Minus 2nd and 3rd Engineer Platoon), 875th Engineer Battalion (Combat)	Battery B, 4th Battalion, (8 inch)(SP) 142nd Artillery	Blytheville
Det 1, Company D (2nd and 3rd Engineer Platoon), 875th Engineer Battalion (Combat)	Service Battery, 4th Battalion, (8 inch)(SP) 142nd Artillery	Rector
224th Light Maintenance Company (DS) (Minus Maintenance Platoon)	Battery A, 3rd Battalion, (155mm)(Towed) 142nd Artillery	Mountain Home
Det1, 224th Light Maintenance Company (DS) (Maintenance Platoon)	Company C (Forward Support), 739th Ordnance Battalion	Marshall
1123rd Transportation Company	Battery B, 2nd Battalion, (8 inch)(SP) 142nd Artillery	Paris

The Headquarters was again redesignated on 1 May 1972 as Headquarters and Headquarters Battery, 142d Field Artillery Group, and on 1 May 1978 as Headquarters and Headquarters Battery, 142d Field Artillery Brigade.

The 142nd Field Artillery Brigade was ordered into active Federal service 2 June 1980 at Fayetteville; released on 3 June 1980 from active Federal service and reverted to state control.

== Operation Desert Storm ==
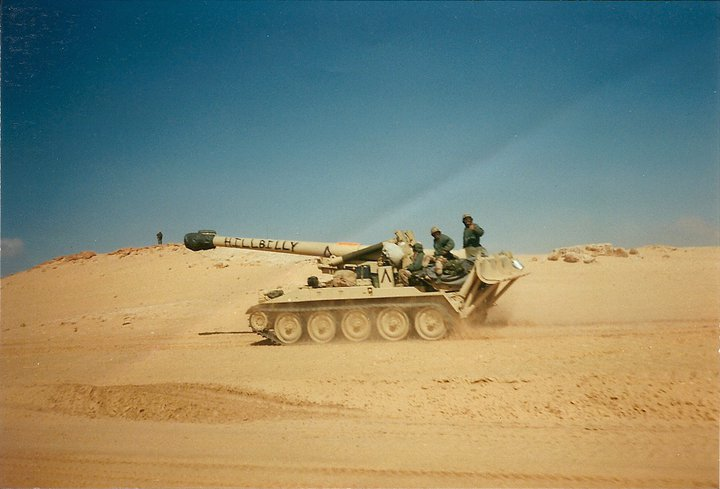
Howitzer Section Number 1, Battery A, 2nd Battalion, 142nd Field Artillery, Crew Members SSG Robert Sampley, Jackie Hickey, Stanley Henson, JR Rankin, Earl Duty

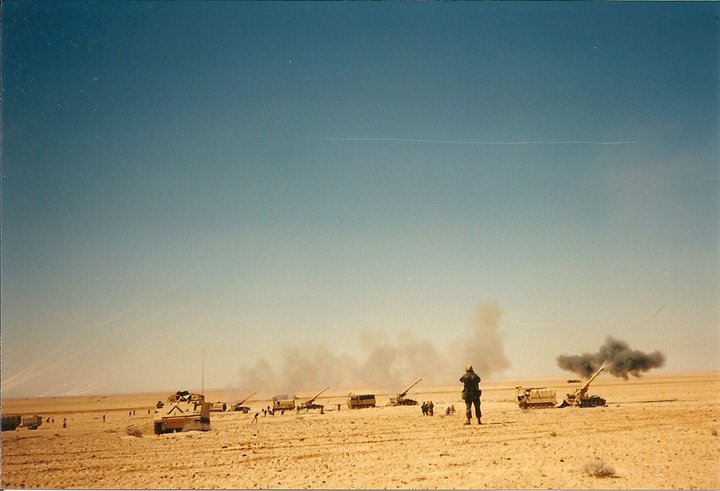
2nd Battalion, 142nd Field Artillery fires against Iraqi positions, Operation Desert Storm, 1991

The 142nd Field Artillery Brigade, Arkansas Army National Guard, with a battalion from Oklahoma, received the alert notification on 15 November 1990 and entered active federal service on 21 November 1990 at Fayetteville. The 142nd mobilized, trained, and was validated at Fort Sill, Oklahoma. The 142nd deployed as a whole to support Operation Desert Storm. It was the only National Guard field artillery unit to serve in this capacity. The brigade deployed to Saudi Arabia on 15 January 1991, was attached to the VII Corps, supported the 1st Infantry Division during breaching operations, and supported the 1st United Kingdom Armored Division during the ground campaign. It was released on 11 September 1991 from active federal service and reverted to state control.

The Headquarters and Headquarters Battery, 142nd Field Artillery Brigade was consolidated on 30 September 1996 with Headquarters Detachment, 937 Signal Battalion, and the consolidated unit was designated as Headquarters and Headquarters Battery, 142d Field Artillery Brigade.

== Multi-National Stabilization Force ==
In December 1997, the Meteorology Section of HHB, 142nd Field Artillery Brigade deployed to Bosnia as part of the Multinational Stabilization Force, in order to assist with the enforcement of the mandate of the United Nations Mission in Bosnia and Herzegovina (UNMIBH).

In 2005, Battery A, 1–142nd was also mobilized and deployed to Kosovo in support of the Multinational Stabilization Force.

== The Global War on Terrorism ==
Since the terrorist attacks of 11 September 2001, every unit in the 142nd Field Artillery Brigade has been deployed in support of the ongoing Global War on Terrorism.

=== Operation Noble Eagle ===
2nd Battalion, 142nd Field Artillery, and the Headquarters and Headquarters Service Battery of the 1st Battalion, 142nd Field Artillery were mobilized in 2002 and 2003 in support of Operation Noble Eagle to provide security at critical sites within the United States.

During 2002–2003, 2–142nd Field Artillery units mobilized in support of security operations in critical areas around Arkansas and Louisiana. Battery C, 2–142nd deployed to Fort Polk, Louisiana. Battery B, 2–142nd deployed to Fort Huachuca, and Battery A, 2–142nd deployed to Pine Bluff, Arkansas.

In June 2004 Headquarters and Headquarters Service Battery of the 1st Battalion, 142nd Field Artillery mobilized in support of security operations for Army depots located at Pine Bluff, Arkansas, and Pueblo, Colorado.

=== Operation Iraqi Freedom ===
The 142nd Fires Brigade has mobilized multiple units in support of Operation Iraqi Freedom. Headquarters and Headquarters Battery, 142nd Fires Brigade deployed to Iraq March 2007 through March 2008 to provide command and control of fire-support assets near Tikrit, Iraq.

Battery B, 1–142nd was deployed to Iraq in November 2005 after completing its required three months of training for deployment in Fort Lewis, Washington. Upon deployment, Battery B, 1–142nd were attached to the 43rd Military Police Brigade then came under the command of the 16th Airborne Brigade during the latter months of deployment. Battery B was sent to FOB Grizzly (Ashraf) to conduct FOB essential missions such as convoy escort, area security patrols, desert LP/OPs, and TCP/ECP. In January 2006 Battery B, 1–142nd was assigned to the infamous prison at FOB Abu Ghraib, leaving behind its 3rd platoon in FOB Grizzly to conduct convoy escorts. In May 2006 3rd platoon rejoined the rest of the battery in Abu Ghraib after many convoy escort missions resulting in no equipment or personnel lost. In July 2006 Battery B, 1–142nd played an essential role in the closure of the prison in Abu Ghraib, the transfer of detainees to and the opening of Camp Cropper. Battery B, returned from deployment in Iraq in October 2006 with no KIAs and sustaining 4 wounded after completing many dangerous missions. Many soldiers from Battery B were awarded CABs (Combat Action Badge) during the deployment. The Meritorious Unit Commendation for "Exceptionally Meritorious Service" during Operation Iraqi Freedom was awarded to Battery B.

Battery C, 1–142 deployed to Baghdad, Iraq on 19 March 2006 after 3 months of training at Fort Dix, New Jersey. The unit was responsible for the base defense and force protection of Camp Cropper until 18 February 2007 when they transferred authority to the 198th FA out of the KY NG. C Battery was responsible for three perimeter towers, four quick reaction force (QRF) patrols and two entry control points (ECP). C Battery also performed area security and escorts for Kellogg, Brown and Root (KBR) outside the Victory Base Complex. All members of C Battery also performed two to three-week rotations at Abu Ghraib prison, to support 3–321 Field Artillery in base defense of Abu Ghraib.

2–142nd received an alert order for mobilization in support of Operation Iraqi Freedom in March 2006. The battalion, minus Charlie Battery, and the 937th Forward Support Company mobilized in July 2006 with duty as a Security Force (SECFOR) unit in Kuwait. 2nd Battalion moved to Camp Shelby, Mississippi in July 2006 and conducted training there until October 2006. The unit deployed to Kuwait and was stationed at Camp Patriot, Kuwait Naval Base and Camp Arifjan. HHB and Alpha Battery were stationed at Camp Patriot with Alpha providing security at Camp Patriot. HHB provided an Area Reaction Force (ARF) covering Southern Kuwait to include Kuwait City. Bravo Battery was stationed at Camp Arifjan and provided security for the port of Ash Shu'aybah, also called the SPOD/E or Sea Port of Debarkation/Embarkation. The units redeployed in October 2007.

Battery C, 2–142nd mobilized in November 2006 with training at Camp Shelby Mississippi. They deployed to Camp Behring, Kuwait for training and forward movement. Battery C's mission was convoy escort SECFOR based out of Tallil Iraq. Charlie Battery completed over 350 convoy escort missions, safely moving over 20,000 white trucks loaded with supplies, food, and fuel from their base at Tallil to as far north as LSA Anaconda and as far west as Taqqaddam. In those 350 plus missions, they had a total of 144 engagements with the enemy, the most of any element in their task force. These attacks included forty-six Improvised Explosive Device (IED) detonations, forty-eight IED discoveries, twenty-nine small arms fire attacks, seven complex attacks, and eight rocket-propelled grenade (RPG) or indirect fire (IDF) rocket attacks. The average soldier in Battery C conducted approximately fifty-three missions while either, driving, gunning, or as the truck commander with an average of two thousand miles per month. The unit put over 792,000 hard miles on their Convoy Protection platforms, and close to 4 million miles on the trucks they escorted. Battery C known by their call sign "Cold Steel" performed one of the most dangerous missions in this theater, engaging the enemy, and ultimately being awarded 152 combat action badges. They redeployed in February 2008.

On 1 October 2007 the 217th Brigade Support Battalion of the 142nd Fires Brigade mobilized in support of the 39th Infantry Brigade Combat Team's (Arkansas) latest deployment to Iraq. Headquarters and Headquarters Company, Company A, 217th, and Company B, 217th deployed to conduct missions ranging from convoy escort, base defense and garrison command. The 217th redeployed in December 2008 only a few days prior to Christmas.

=== Operation Katrina and humanitarian operations ===
Elements from every unit in the 142nd Field Artillery Brigade deployed in support of relief operations in the wake of two of the deadliest hurricanes to ever hit the United States. On 1 September 2005 units from the 142nd Field Artillery Brigade conducted simultaneous operations in support of relief efforts to those devastated by Hurricane Katrina.

In Arkansas, elements of the 142nd mobilized to supported efforts at the Fort Chaffee Maneuver Training Center (FCMTC) to house and feed thousands of displaced civilians from the Gulf Coast region.

Other 142nd units mobilized and conducted convoy operations arriving in New Orleans, Louisiana on 2 September 2005. The 142nd Field Artillery Brigade officially took command of the Arkansas contingent located in New Orleans in November 2005. Elements of the brigade remained in New Orleans through the end of February 2006 when the National Guard completed its historic six-month operation. Arkansas was one of the first states to respond to this natural disaster and the last state to withdraw from Louisiana. Operation Katrina was one of the largest humanitarian efforts conducted by the National Guard, involving units from all fifty states and four territories.

== Fallen soldiers ==
=== World War I ===
There are no recorded combat-related deaths in the 142nd Field Artillery for World War I.

PVT Robert Jack, service number 1601995 was KIA during the Battle of St. Mihiel, France. He died as a member of D Battery, 150th F.A., 42nd Division. He was part of the 20% that was assigned to the 142nd F.A.. He deployed on the USS Saxon 28 June 1918 from Battery B, Camp Beauregard F.A. Sheet 6 of the HQ Port of Embarkation, Hoboken NJ, and Page 11 of the List of Mothers and Widows of American Soldiers Sailors and Marines entitled to Make a pilgrimage to the war cemeteries in Europe.

=== World War II ===
==== 936th Field Artillery Battalion ====
The 936th sustained one officer and six enlisted soldiers killed and one officer and twenty-seven enlisted soldiers wounded.

===== 937th Field Artillery Battalion =====
The 937th sustained one officer and thirteen enlisted soldiers killed and 126 soldiers wounded.

=== Korea ===
==== 936th Field Artillery Battalion ====
The battalion suffered a total of ten killed and twenty-eight wounded during the war including:

- Private First Class Bertram E. Schultz, Battery A, 936th FA, 20 July 1951
- Private First Class Kleinschmidt, Battery B, 936th FA, 17 November 1951
- Corporal James Edwards, Battery B, 936th FA, 1 May 1952
- Private First Class Perez-Crespo, Battery C, 936th FA, 1 May 1952
- Private First Class McGinnis, Service Battery C, 936th FA, 21 August 1952

===== 937th Field Artillery Battalion =====
The battalion suffered a total of thirteen killed and 156 wounded during the war including:

- Sergeant James F. Harrington, Headquarters Battery, 937th FA, 8 April 1951
- Private First Class Jarrell D. Graham, Battery B, 937th FA, 13 May 1951
- Private First Class La Tareanu, Battery C, 937th FA, 20 January 1952
- Private First Class Woillie Grooms, Battery C, 937th FA, 2 February 1952
- Private First Class Baker, Battery C, 937th FA, 7 February 1952
- Private First Class Sechman, Battery B, 937th FA, 26 March 1952
- Private First Class James F. Winckler, Battery C, 937th FA, 26 March 1952
- Private First Class Taylor, Battery C, 937th FA, 26 March 1952
- First Lieutenant Leon A. Lancaster, Headquarters Battery, 937th FA, 26 March 1952

=== Global War on Terrorism ===
- Sgt. Russell L. Collier, Age 48, 1st Battalion, 142nd Field Artillery, (assigned to and deployed with 1st Battalion, 206th Field Artillery Regiment at time of death), Harrison, Arkansas, 3 October 2004. Sgt Collier's unit, a howitzer section from Battery A, 1st Battalion, 103rd Field Artillery was conducting joint traffic control points, route security and area reconnaissance with members of the 307th Iraqi National Guard Battalion, along Tigris River near the village of Al Mazurka, Taji, Iraq, when the patrol came under small arms fire. Iraqi National Guard soldiers pursued the potential shooter. The howitzer section established over-watching crew-served weapons positions with their gun trucks. Five Iraqi National Guard soldiers and four U.S. soldiers, including Sgt Collier and his section chief, SSG Potts, maneuvered between the village and the Tigris River to find the shooter. Sgt Collier was accompanying the fireteam when the section came under significant direct fire contact. Sgt Collier waited his turn as the Soldiers conducted buddy team maneuvers around a berm that was pro¬viding cover and concealment for the team. During this maneuver, SSG Christopher Potts, Collier's section leader, was wounded and pinned down. Sgt Collier handed his M4 to another Soldier instructed him to get his aid bag and left the protection pro¬vided by the berm to provide immediate first aid to SSG Potts. His unselfish actions under direct enemy fire led to his own mortal wounds. He was posthumously awarded the Silver Star for his gallantry. A health clinic at Fort Hood, Texas, has been named in honor of Sgt Collier.
- Sgt. John R. Massey, Age 29, C Battery, 2nd Battalion, 142nd Fires Brigade, Judsonia, Arkansas, died in Balad, Iraq, on 15 July 2007 of injuries suffered when a roadside bomb exploded near his vehicle during combat operations in Baghdad, Iraq, on 14 July.
- Pfc. Derek J. Plowman, Age 20, 1st Battalion, 142nd Fires Brigade, Everton, Arkansas, died from a gunshot wound in Baghdad, Iraq, on 20 July 2006.
- Sgt. Chenoweth, Mike, C Battery, 2nd Battalion, 142nd FA
- Spc. Vidhyarkorn, Chirasak, C Battery, 2nd Battalion, 142nd FA, called from IRR to fill.

== Campaign participation credit ==
=== World War I ===
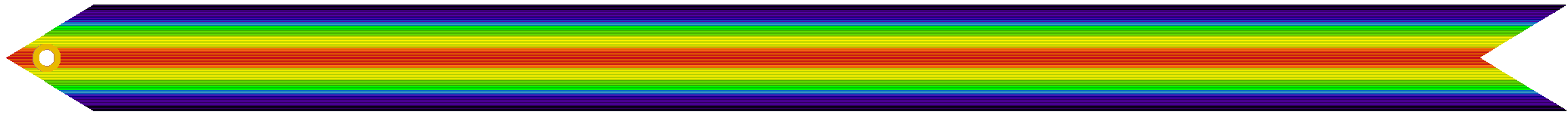
- Streamer without inscription

=== World War II ===
- European-African-Middle Eastern
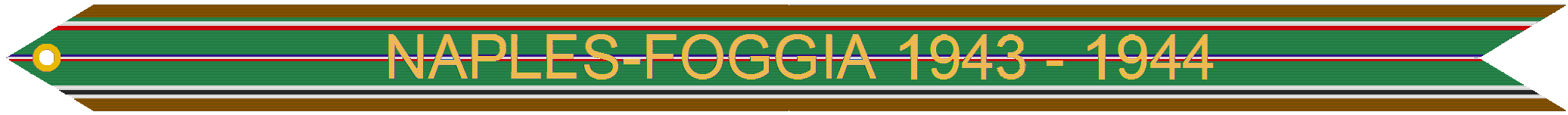
- Naples-Foggia
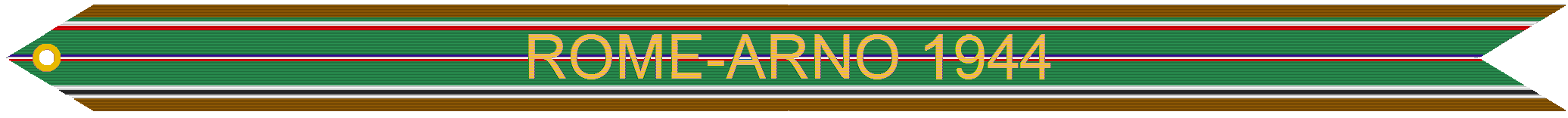
- Rome-Arno
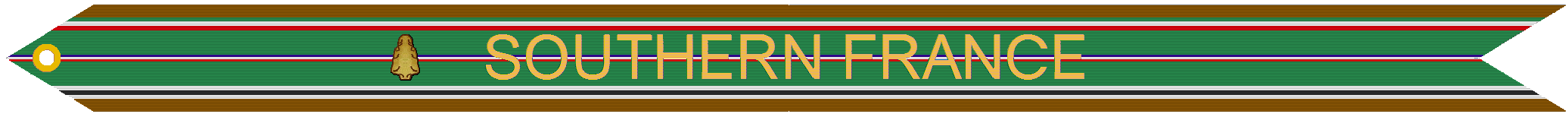
- Southern France 1944
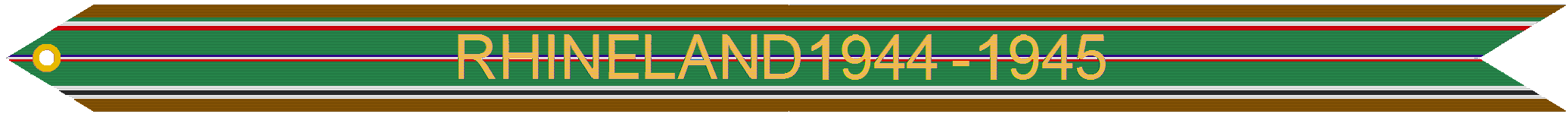
- Rhineland
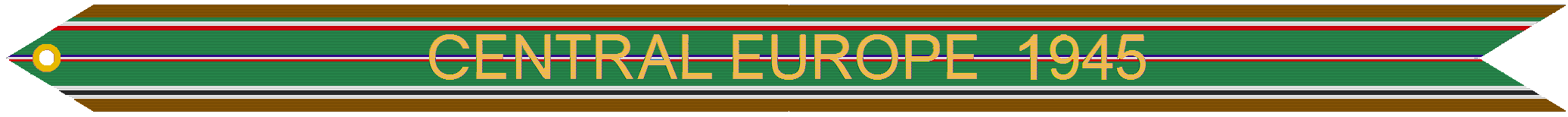
- Central Europe 1945
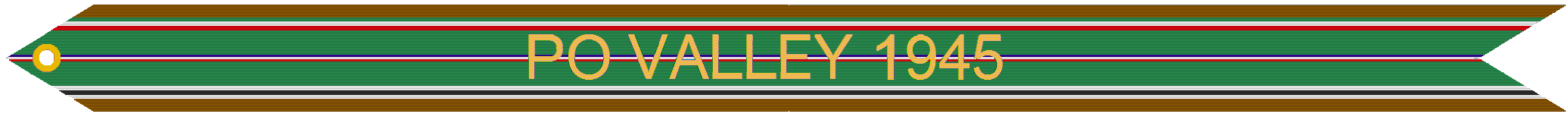
- Po Valley

=== Korean War ===
- 1st U.N. Counter Offensive 1951
- CCF Spring Offensive 1951
- U.N. Summer-Fall Offensive 1951
- Second Korean Winter 1951–1952
- Korea Summer-Fall, 1952
- Third Korean Winter 1952–1953
- Korea Summer 1953

=== Southwest Asia ===
- Defense of Saudi Arabia 1990–1991
- Liberation and Defense of Kuwait 1991
- Cease-Fire 1991–1995

=== War on Terrorism ===
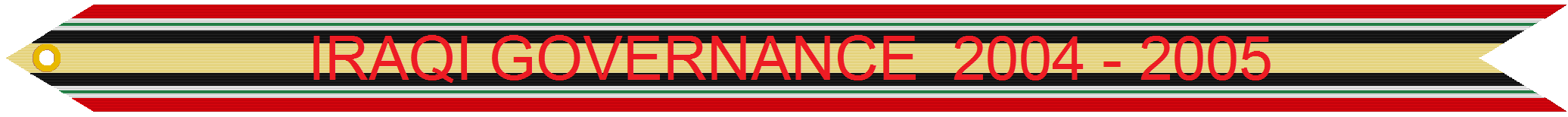
- Iraqi Governance

== Commanders ==
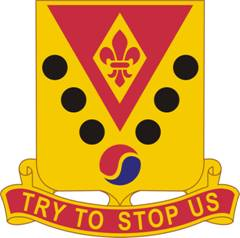
COL Troy Galloway, Commander, Commander 142nd Fires Brigade, June 2011 to June 2014

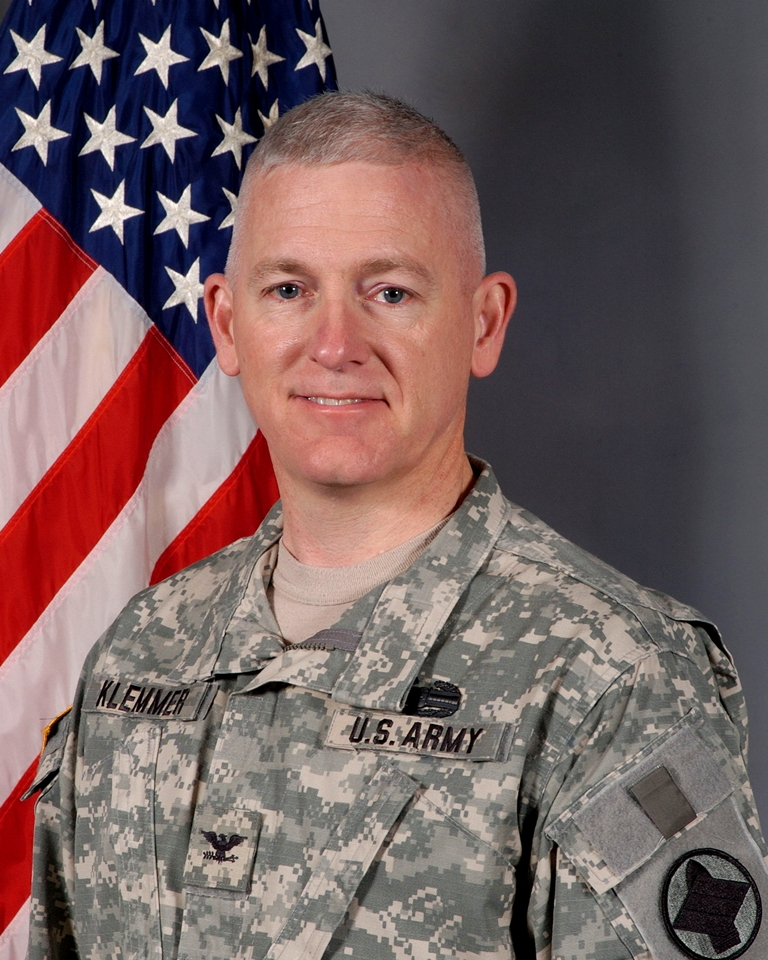
COL Keith A. Klemmer, Commander 142nd Fires Brigade, June 2008 – October 2011

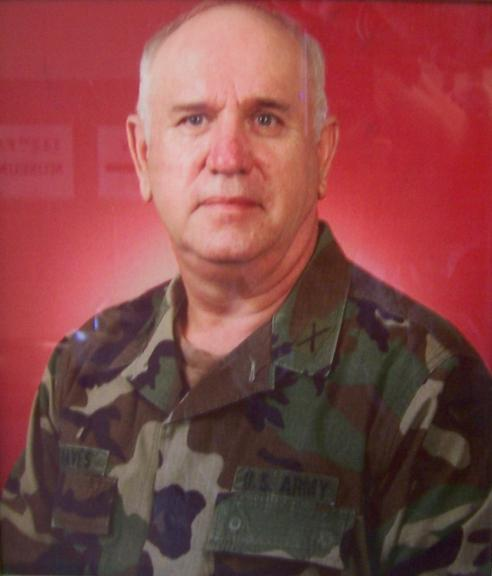
COL Russell D. Graves, Commander 142nd Field Artillery Brigade, August 2002 – July 2005

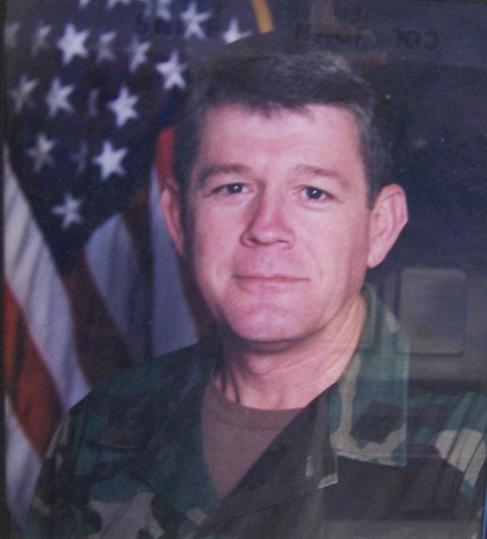
COL George "Mike" Ross, Commander 142nd Field Artillery Brigade, July 2000 – July 2002

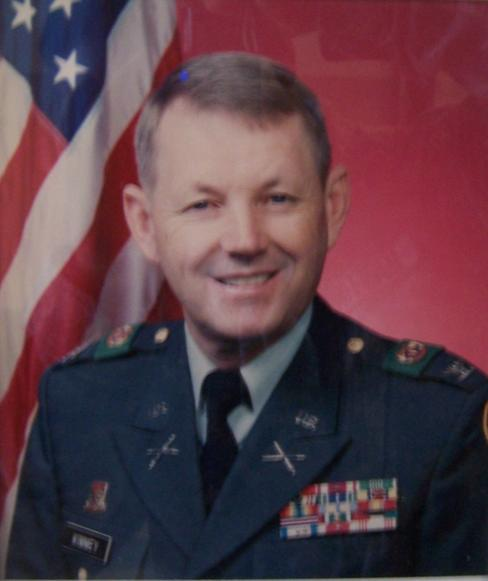
COL Kim Kimmey, Commander 142nd Field Artillery Brigade, July 1998 – June 2000

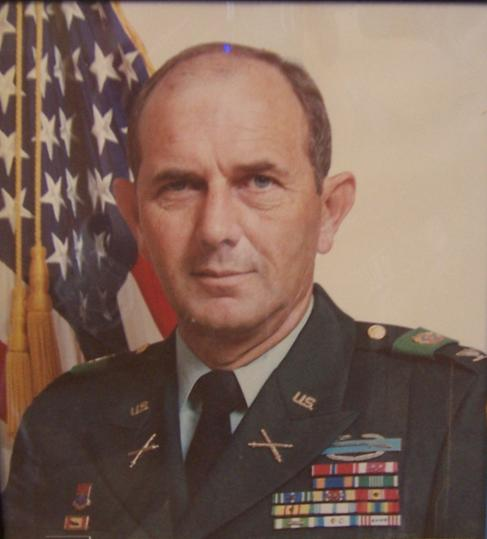
COL Norman J. Cox, Commander 142nd Field Artillery Brigade, August 1996 – June 1998

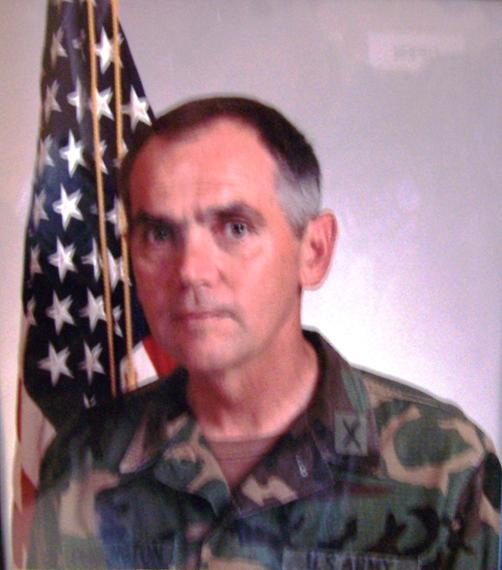
COL James R. Pennington, Commander 142nd Field Artillery Brigade, September 1993 – July 1996

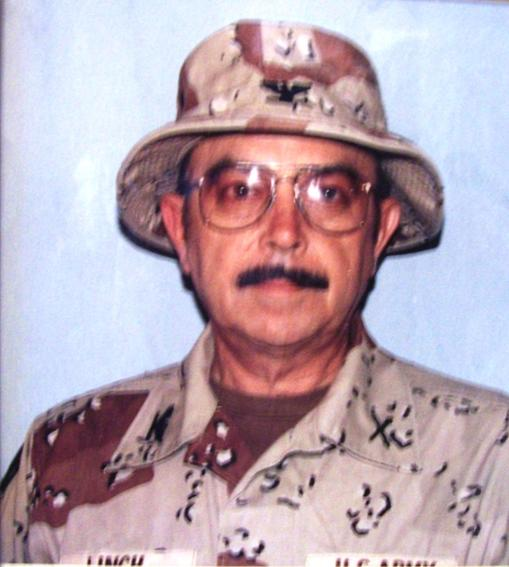
COL Charles J. Linch, Commander 142nd Field Artillery Brigade, December 1990 – August 1993. COL Linch commanded the brigade during its deployment to the Persian Gulf in support of Operation Desert Storm.

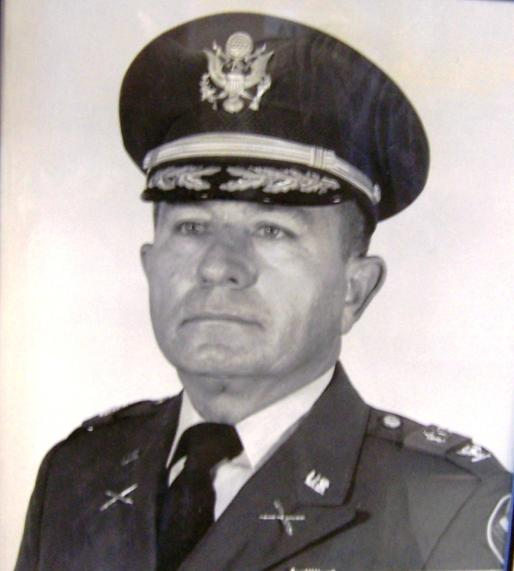
COL Bobby H. Armistead, Commander 142nd Field Artillery Brigade, August 1986 – November 1990

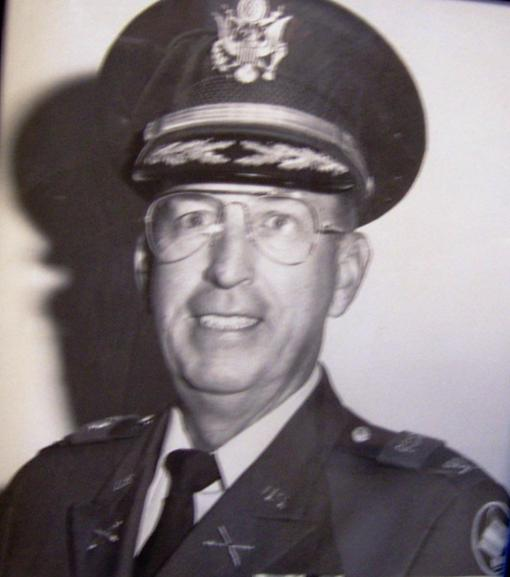
COL Richard L. Holt Jr., Commander 142nd Field Artillery Brigade, November 1983 – July 1986

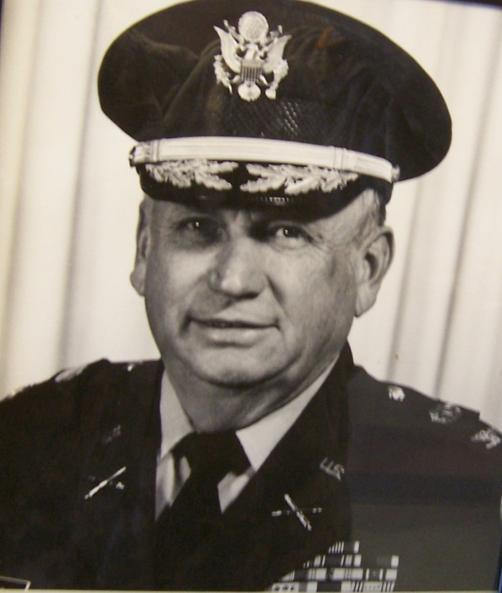
COL Howard N. Riggs, Commander 142nd Field Artillery Brigade, March 1980 – October 1983

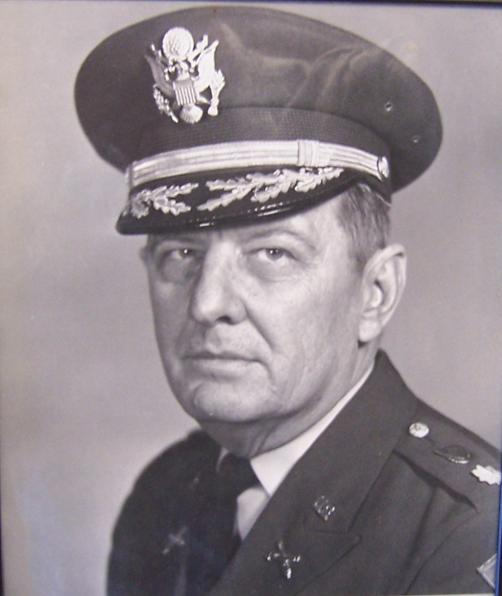
COL Edwin E. Lee, Commander 142nd Field Artillery Brigade, March 1976 – February 1980

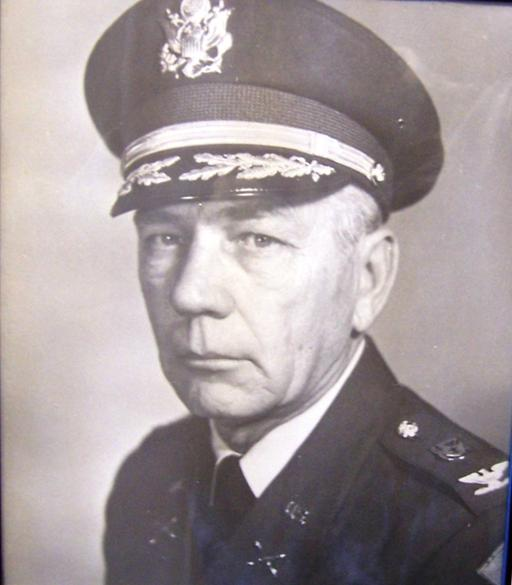
COL Bernard A. Gunter, Commander 142nd Field Artillery Group, April 1971 – February 1976

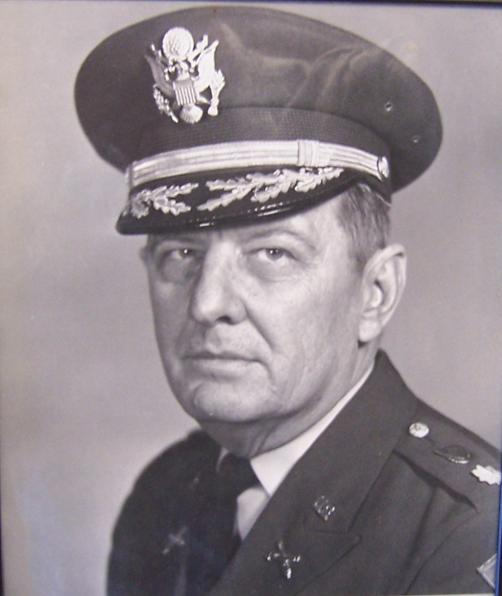
LTC Edwin E. Lee, Commander 142nd Field Artillery Group, February 1971 – March 1971

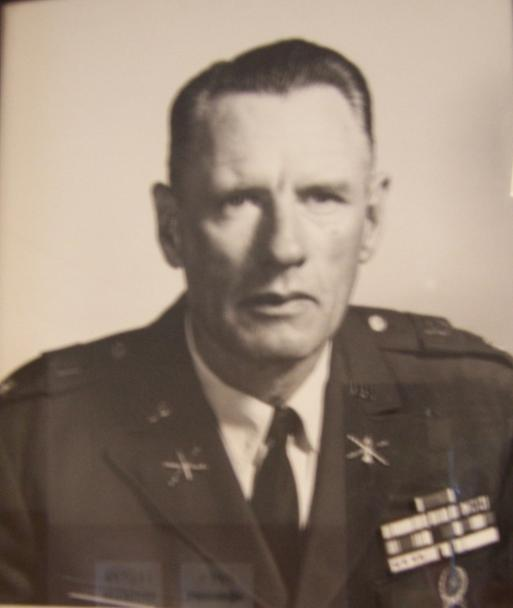
COL William L. Bush, Commander 142nd Field Artillery Group, February 1966 – January 1971

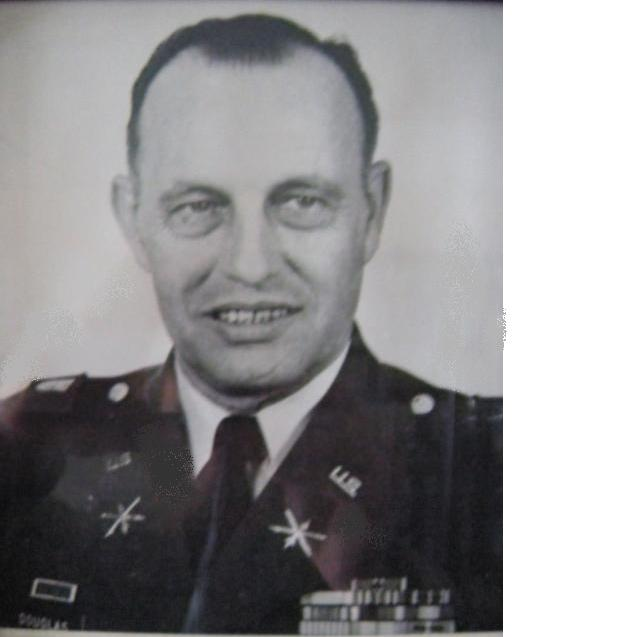
COL Thomas E. Douglas, Commander 142nd Field Artillery Group, July 1960 – January 1966

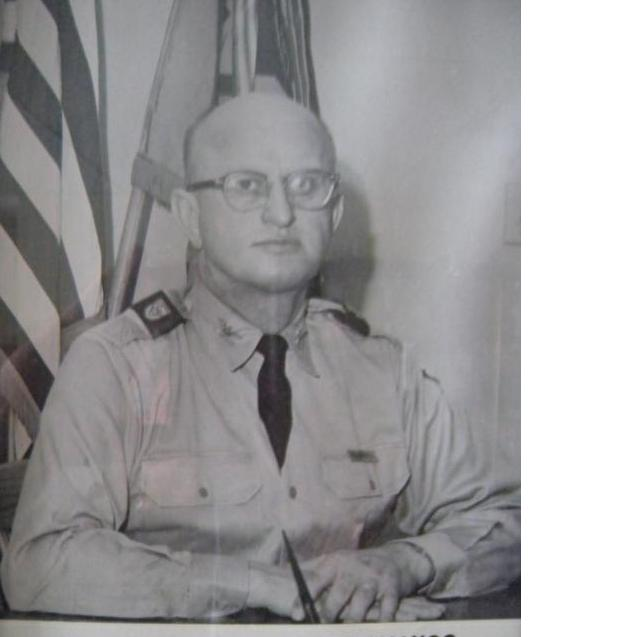
COL Maupin Cummings, Commander 142nd Field Artillery Group (Rear), May 1953 – July 1960

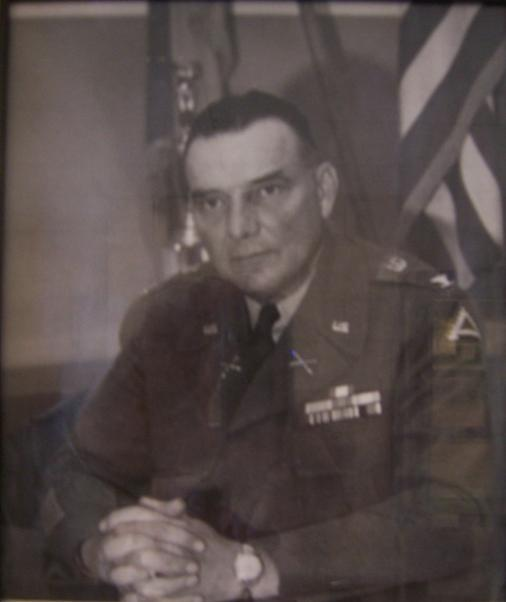
COL Robert Q. Brown, Commander 142nd Field Artillery Group (Forward), October 1953 – May 1954

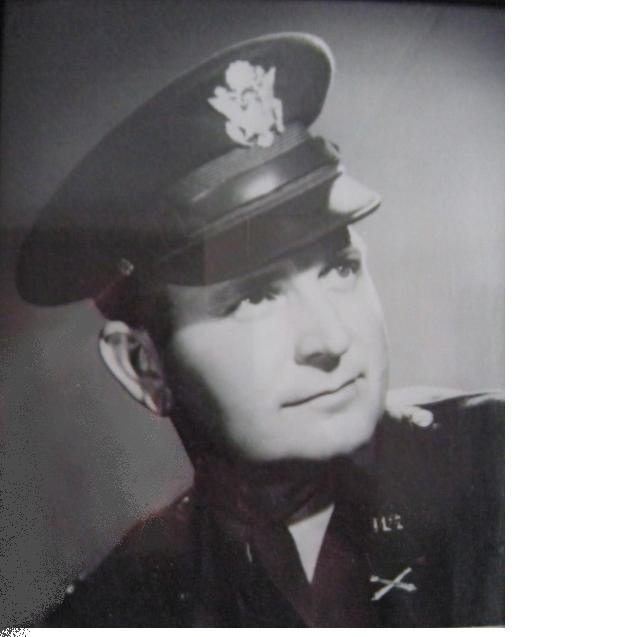
MAJ Clinton E. Meadows, Commander 142nd Field Artillery Group (Rear), September 1952 – April 1953

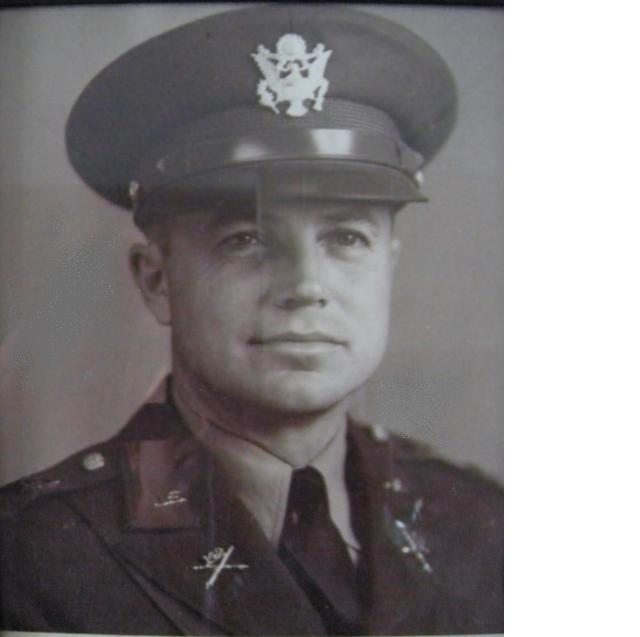
COL William C. Smith, Commander 142nd Field Artillery Regiment, October 1946 – December 1952

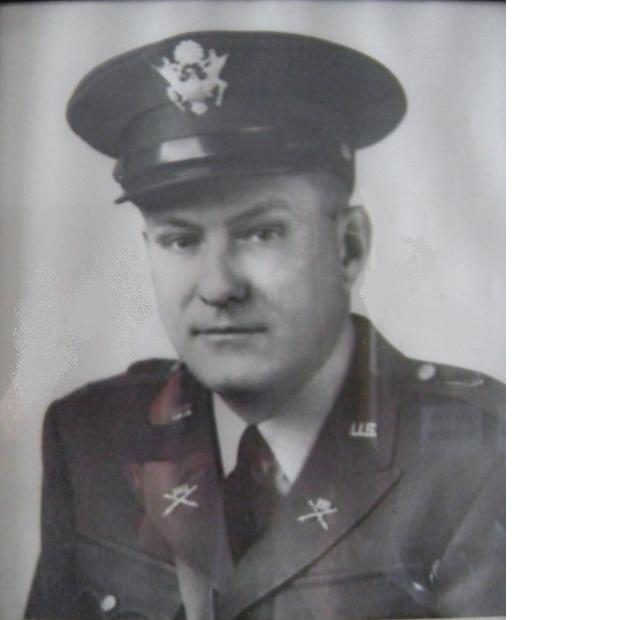
COL Jerome F. Thompson, Commander 142nd Field Artillery Regiment, January 1941 – June 1945. COL Thompson served as the regimental commander during combat actions across Europe in World War II.

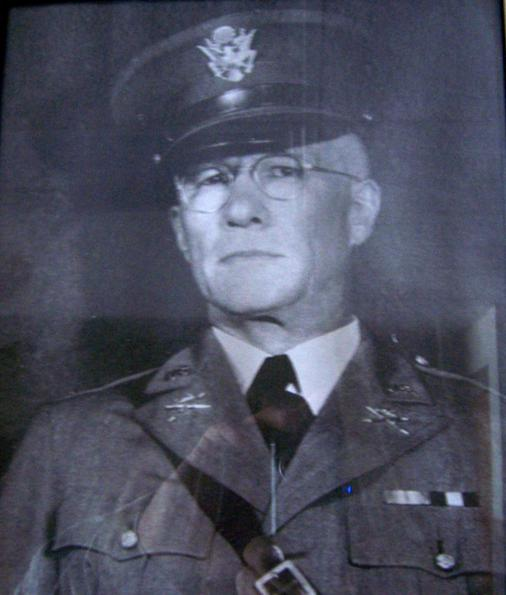
COL Ebenezer L. Compere, Commander 142 Field Artillery, May 1937 – December 1940

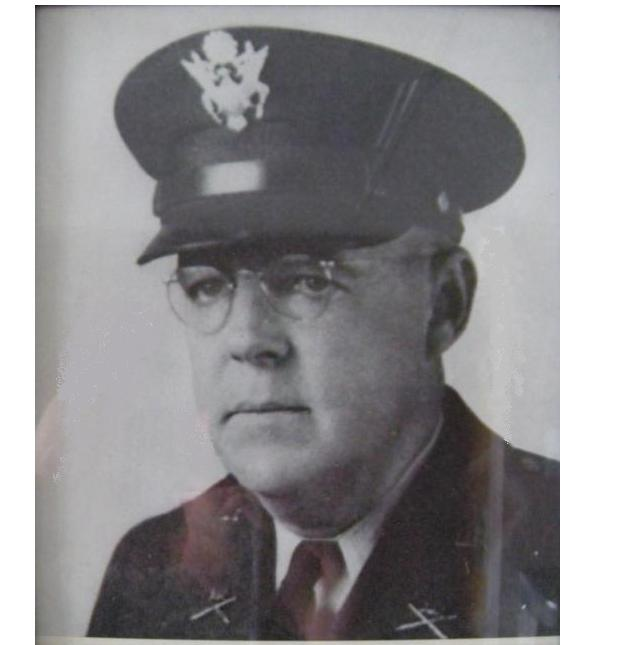
COL Samuel B. Scott, Commander 142 Field Artillery, April 1936 – May 1937

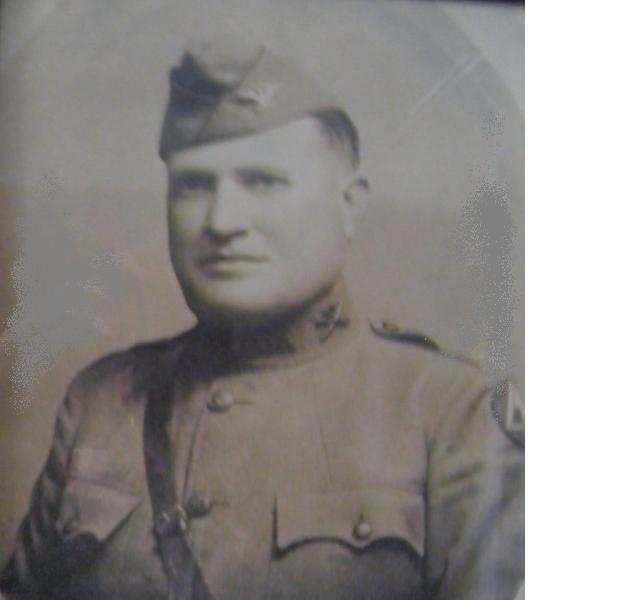
COL William G. Ownbey, Commander 142nd Field Artillery, May 1918 – June 1919. He commanded 142nd soldiers as part of America's expeditionary forces during World War I.

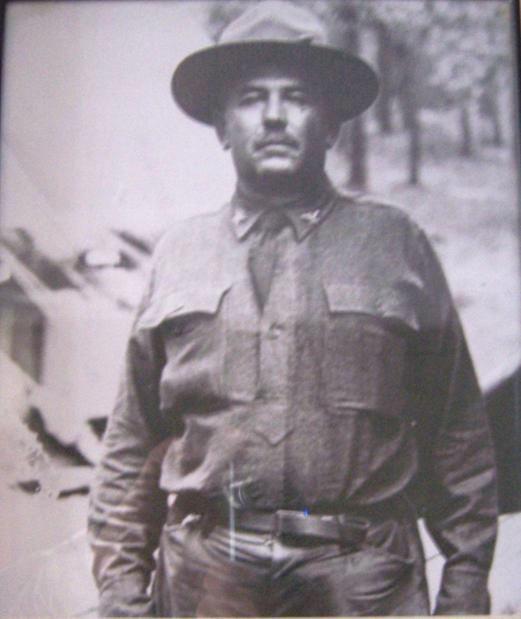
COL Henery E. Stroupe, Commander 142nd Field Artillery, 17 October – 18 April. COL Stroupe was the first commander of the newly formed regiment.

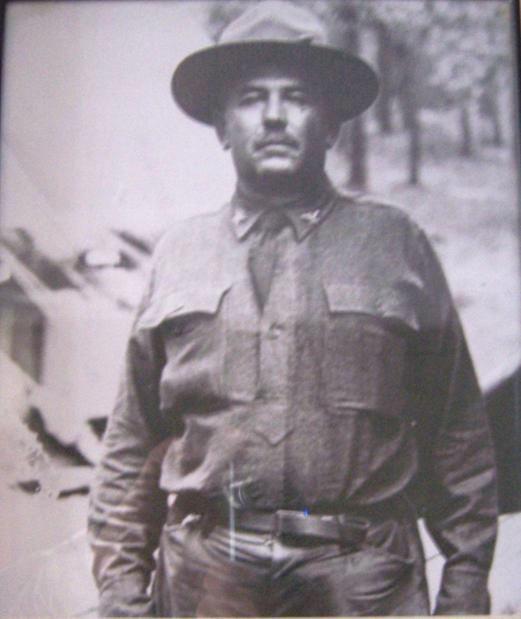
COL Henery E. Stroupe, Commander 2nd Arkansas Infantry, 24 October July 1905 – October 1918.

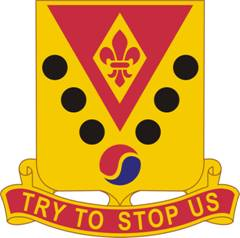
COL Charles T. Duke, Commander 2nd Arkansas Infantry, 1903–1905.

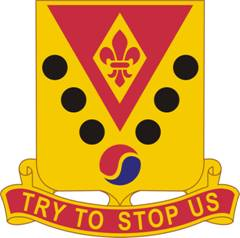
COL Claude H. Sayle, Commander 2nd Arkansas Infantry, 1902–1903.

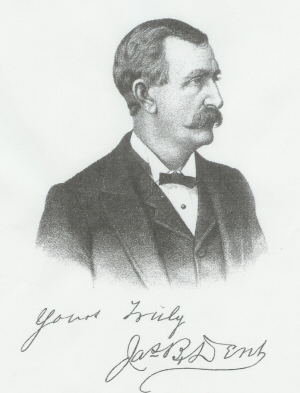
COL James B. Dent, Commander 2nd Arkansas Infantry, 1900–1902.

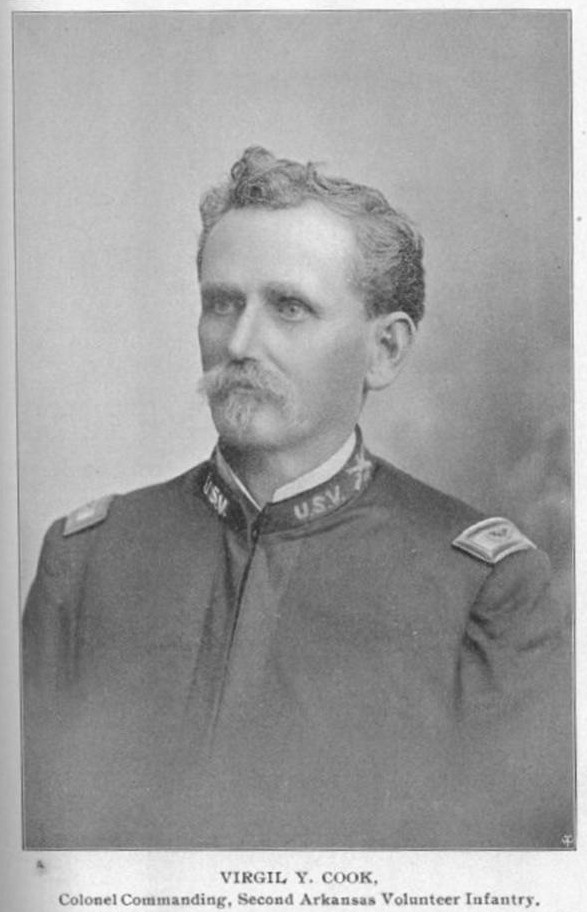
COL Virgil Y. Cook, Commander 2nd Arkansas Volunteer Infantry, 1897–1899

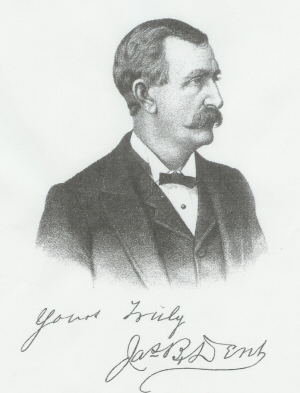
COL Colonel James B. Dent, Commander 2nd Arkansas Infantry, 1896–1897

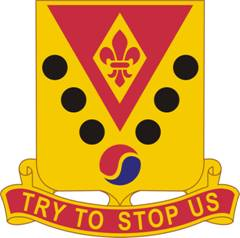
COL Lancelot Minor, Commander, 2nd Regiment, Arkansas State Guard, 1894–1895

== Organization ==
- 142nd Field Artillery Brigade, in Fayetteville (AR) — (Arkansas Army National Guard)
  - Headquarters and Headquarters Battery, 142nd Field Artillery Brigade, in Fayetteville (AR)
  - 1st Battalion, 117th Field Artillery Regiment, in Andalusia (AL) (M777A2) — (Alabama Army National Guard)
    - Headquarters and Headquarters Battery, 1st Battalion, 117th Field Artillery Regiment, in Andalusia (AL)
    - Battery A, 1st Battalion, 117th Field Artillery Regiment, in Phenix City (AL)
    - Battery B, 1st Battalion, 117th Field Artillery Regiment, in Montgomery (AL)
    - Battery C, 1st Battalion, 117th Field Artillery Regiment, in Troy (AL)
    - 117th Forward Support Company, in Troy (AL)
      - Detachment 1, 117th Forward Support Company, in Elba (AL)
  - 1st Battalion, 142nd Field Artillery Regiment, in Bentonville (AR) (M270A2 MLRS) — (Arkansas Army National Guard)
    - Headquarters and Headquarters Battery, 1st Battalion, 142nd Field Artillery Regiment, in Bentonville (AR)
    - Battery A, 1st Battalion, 142nd Field Artillery Regiment, in Bentonville (AR)
    - Battery B, 1st Battalion, 142nd Field Artillery Regiment, in Bentonville (AR)
    - 936th Forward Support Company, in Bentonville (AR)
  - 2nd Battalion, 142nd Field Artillery Regiment, at Fort Chaffee (AR) (M109A6 Paladin) — (Arkansas Army National Guard)
    - Headquarters and Headquarters Battery, 2nd Battalion, 142nd Field Artillery Regiment, at Fort Chaffee (AR)
    - Battery A, 2nd Battalion, 142nd Field Artillery Regiment, at Fort Chaffee (AR)
    - Battery B, 2nd Battalion, 142nd Field Artillery Regiment, in Siloam Springs (AR)
    - Battery C, 2nd Battalion, 142nd Field Artillery Regiment, in Ozark (AR)
    - 937th Forward Support Company, at Fort Chaffee (AR)
  - 1st Battalion, 181st Field Artillery Regiment, in Chattanooga (TN) (M142 HIMARS) — (Tennessee Army National Guard)
    - Headquarters and Headquarters Battery, 1st Battalion, 181st Field Artillery Regiment, in Chattanooga (TN)
    - Battery A, 1st Battalion, 181st Field Artillery Regiment, in Lawrenceburg (TN)
    - Battery B, 1st Battalion, 181st Field Artillery Regiment, in Pulaski (TN)
      - Detachment 1, Battery B, 1st Battalion, 181st Field Artillery Regiment, in Fayetteville (TN)
    - 181st Forward Support Company, in Athens (TN)
      - Detachment 1, 181st Forward Support Company, in Dayton (TN)
  - 217th Brigade Support Battalion, in Lincoln (AR) — (Arkansas Army National Guard)
    - Headquarters Support Battery, 217th Brigade Support Battalion, in Lincoln (AR)
    - 142nd Signal Company, Fayetteville (AR)

== Heraldry ==
Distinctive unit insignia

Description: A gold color metal and enamel device 1 1/8 inches (2.9 cm) in height consisting of a shield blazoned: Or, on a pile Gules between six gunstones pilewise above a Korean Taeguk Proper, a lozenge of the first bearing a fleur-de-lis of the second. Attached below the shield a Red scroll inscribed "TRY TO STOP US" in Gold letters.

Symbolism: Scarlet and yellow (gold) are the colors used for Artillery and a gunstone is symbolic of a missile. The fleur-de-lis refers to the unit's service in France, World War I. The pile alludes to an arrowhead and with the fleur-de-lis represents the organization's assault landing in Southern France, World War II, the gunstones symbolizing the unit's participation in six other campaigns in Europe. The Taeguk refers to the first U.N. counteroffensive campaign in the Korean War, and the gunstones are again used to denote the six other campaigns. The lozenge simulates a diamond and refers to Arkansas, denoting the Army National Guard of the State.

Background: The distinctive unit insignia was originally approved for the 142d Artillery Regiment on 9 March 1972. It was redesignated for the 142d Field Artillery Regiment on 28 August 1972.

Coat of arms

Blazon:

Shield: Or, on a pile Gules between six gunstones pilewise above a Korean Taeguk Proper, a lozenge of the first bearing a fleur-de-lis of the second.

Crest: That for the regiments and separate battalions of the Arkansas Army National Guard: On a wreath of the colors Or and Gules above two sprays of apple blossoms Proper a diamond Argent charged with four mullets Azure, one in upper point and three in lower, within a border of the last bearing twenty-five mullets of the second.

Motto: TRY TO STOP US.

Symbolism:

Shield: Scarlet and yellow (gold) are the colors used for Artillery and a gunstone is symbolic of a missile. The fleur-de-lis refers to the unit's service in France, World War I. The pile alludes to an arrowhead and with the fleur-de-lis represents the organization's assault landing in Southern France, World War II, the gunstones symbolizing the unit's participation in six other campaigns in Europe. The Taeguk refers to the first U.N. counteroffensive campaign in the Korean War, and the gunstones are again used to denote the six other campaigns. The lozenge simulates a diamond and refers to Arkansas, denoting the Army National Guard of the State.

Crest: The crest is that of the Arkansas Army National Guard.

Background: The coat of arms was originally approved for the 142d Artillery Regiment on 23 December 1971. It was amended to correct the blazon of the crest on 30 March 1972. It was redesignated for the 142d Field Artillery Regiment on 28 August 1972.
